= List of bird species described in the 2010s =

See also parent article Bird species new to science

This page details the bird species described as new to science in the years 2010 to 2019:

== Summary statistics ==
=== Number of species described per year ===
Year	2010	2011	2012	2013	2014	2015	2016	2017	2018	2019
Number of new species described	5	3	7	28	5	3	5	8	6	5

=== Countries with high numbers of newly described species ===
- Brazil
- Peru
- Philippines
- Indonesia

== The birds, year-by-year ==
=== 2010 ===
- Limestone leaf warbler, Phylloscopus calciatilis
- Fenwick's antpitta or Urrao antpitta, Grallaria fenwickorum
- Socotra buzzard, Buteo socotraensis
- Willard's sooty boubou, Laniarius willardi
- Rock tapaculo, Scytalopus petrophilus

=== 2011 ===
- Tsingy wood rail, Canirallus beankaensis
- Bryan's shearwater, Puffinus bryani
- Várzea thrush, Turdus sanchezorum

=== 2012 ===
- Alta Floresta antpitta, Hylopezus whittakeri
- Antioquia wren, Thryophilus sernai
- Sira barbet, Capito fitzpatricki
- †Bermuda towhee, Pipilo naufragus
- Cipó cinclodes, Cinclodes pabsti espinhacensis - Lumped with the long-tailed cinclodes (Cinclodes pabsti) in 2013.
- Camiguin hawk-owl, Ninox leventisi - Split from the Philippine hawk-owl.
- Cebu hawk-owl, Ninox rumseyi - Split from the Philippine hawk-owl.

=== 2013 ===
- Rinjani scops owl, Otus jolandae
- Pincoya storm petrel, Oceanites pincoyae
- Delta Amacuro softtail, Thripophaga amacurensis
- †Bermuda flicker, Colaptes oceanicus
- †Sao Miguel scops owl, Otus frutuosoi
- Seram masked owl, Tyto almae
- Junin tapaculo, Scytalopus gettyae
- Cambodian tailorbird, Orthotomus chaktomuk
- Tropeiro seedeater, Sporophila beltoni
- Sierra Madre ground warbler, Robsonius thompsoni
- Guerrero brush-finch, Arremon kuehnerii
- Omani owl, Strix omanensis
- †New Caledonia snipe, Coenocorypha neocaledonica

The following 15 Brazilian species are described in the 17th volume of the Handbook of the Birds of the World:

- Western striolated-puffbird, Nystalus obamai
- Xingu woodcreeper, Dendrocolaptes retentus
- Inambari woodcreeper, Lepidocolaptes fatimalimae
- Tupana scythebill, Campylorhamphus gyldenstolpei
- Tapajós scythebill, Campylorhamphus cardosoi
- Roosevelt stipple-throated antwren, Epinecrophylla dentei
- Bamboo antwren, Myrmotherula oreni
- Predicted antwren, Herpsilochmus praedictus
- Aripuana antwren, Herpsilochmus stotzi
- Manicoré warbling antbird, Hypocnemis rondoni
- Chico's tyrannulet, Zimmerius chicomendesi
- Acre tody-tyrant, Hemitriccus cohnhafti
- Sucunduri yellow-margined flycatcher, Tolmomyias sucunduri
- Inambari gnatcatcher, Polioptila attenboroughi
- Campina jay, Cyanocorax hafferi

=== 2014 ===
- São Paulo marsh antwren, Formicivora paludicola

(The last issue of Revista Brasileira de Ornitologia. 21, from "Dec 2013", was released in March 2014.)

- Wakatobi flowerpecker, Dicaeum kuehni
- †Cryptic treehunter, Cichlocolaptes mazarbarnetti
- Bahian mouse-colored tapaculo, Scytalopus gonzagai
- Sulawesi streaked flycatcher, Muscicapa sodhii

=== 2015 ===
- Desert owl, Strix hadorami
- Perijá tapaculo, Scytalopus perijanus
- Sichuan bush warbler, Locustella chengi

=== 2016 ===
- Himalayan forest thrush, Zoothera salimalii
- Dahomey forest robin, Stiphrornis dahomeyensis
- Ghana forest robin, Stiphrornis inexpectatus
- Rudder's forest robin, Stiphrornis rudderi
- Ibera seedeater, Sporophila iberaensis

=== 2017 ===
- Tatama tapaculo, Scytalopus alvarezlopezi
- Ashambu blue robin, Sholicola ashambuensis
- Blue-winged amazon, Amazona gomezgarzai
- Painted manakin, Machaeropterus eckelberryi
- Dry-forest sabrewing, Campylopterus calcirupicola
- †Greater Azores bullfinch, Pyrrhula crassa
- Rote myzomela, Myzomela irianawidodoae
- Santa Marta screech owl, Megascops gilesi

=== 2018 ===
- Cordillera Azul antbird, Myrmoderus eowilsoni
- Whenua Hou diving petrel, Pelecanoides whenuahouensis
- Western square-tailed drongo, Dicrurus occidentalis
- Southern dark newtonia, Newtonia lavarambo
- Blue-throated hillstar, Oreotrochilus cyanolaemus
- Rote leaf warbler, Phylloscopus rotiensis

=== 2019 ===
- Cream-eyed bulbul, Pycnonotus pseudosimplex
- Whistling long-tailed cuckoo, Cercococcyx lemaireae
- Western yellow-spotted barbet, Buccanodon dowsetti
- Alor myzomela, Myzomela prawiradilagae
- Spectacled flowerpecker, Dicaeum dayakorum

=== Described in this period, no longer thought to be good species ===
- Strix omanensis, described in 2013, is now thought to be identical with Strix butleri.
- Amazona gomezgarzai, described in 2017, now thought to represent specimens of hybrid origin

=== Described in this period as a species but may instead be a subspecies ===
- Sholicola ashambuensis, described in 2017, tentatively considered a subspecies of S. albiventris by the Clements Checklist.
- Newtonia lavarambo, described in 2018, tentatively considered a subspecies of N. amphicroa by the Clements Checklist.
