= 2015 in birding and ornithology =

- Years in birding and ornithology: 2012 2013 2014 2015 2016 2017 2018
- Centuries: 20th century · 21st century · 22nd century
- Decades: 1980s 1990s 2000s 2010s 2020s 2030s 2040s
- Years: 2012 2013 2014 2015 2016 2017 2018

See also 2014 in birding and ornithology, main events of 2015 and 2016 in birding and ornithology

The year 2015 in birding and ornithology.

== Worldwide ==
=== New species ===
See also Bird species new to science described in the 2010s

- Desert owl Strix hadorami
- Perijá tapaculo Scytalopus perijanus
- Sichuan bush warbler Locustella chengi

== Europe ==
=== Republic of Cyprus ===
- More than 2 million birds are illegally killed during the autumn, including 800,000 on British military sovereign base areas. They are trapped by limesticks and mist net and served as ambelopoulia in restaurants. The illegal trade is estimated to be worth €15 million per annum.

== North America ==
To be completed

== South America ==
=== Argentina ===
- A project to reintroduce the red and green macaw (Ara chloropterus), a nationally extinct species, to Ibera National Park was launched by the Rewilding Argentina Foundation.
