= 2013 in birding and ornithology =

See also 2012 in birding and ornithology, main events of 2013 and 2014 in birding and ornithology

The year 2013 in birding and ornithology.

== Worldwide ==
=== New species ===
See also Bird species new to science described in the 2000s

- São Miguel scops owl, a small extinct owl that once inhabited the island of São Miguel, in the Macaronesian archipelago of the Azores, in the North Atlantic Ocean.
- Rinjani scops owl, Otus jolandae:George Sangster; Ben F. King; Philippe Verbelen & Colin R. Trainor (2013). "A New Owl Species of the Genus Otus (Aves: Strigidae) from Lombok, Indonesia". PLOS ONE. 8 (2) e53712. Bibcode:2013PLoSO...853712S. doi:10.1371/journal.pone.0053712. PMC 3572129. PMID 23418422.
- Pincoya storm petrel, Oceanites pincoyae:Peter Harrison; Michel Sallaberry; Chris P Gaskin; Karen A Baird; Alvaro Jamarillo; Shirley Maria Metz; Mark Pearman; Michael O'Keeffe; Jim Dowdall; Seamus Enright; Kieran Fahy; Jeff Gilligan; Gerard Lillie (2013). "A new storm-petrel species from Chile". The Auk. 130 (1): 180–191. doi:10.1525/auk.2012.12071. S2CID 85987531.
- Delta Amacuro softtail, Thripophaga amacurensis:Steven Leon Hilty; David Ascanio & Andrew W. Whittaker (2013). "A New Species of Softtail (Furnariidae: Thripophaga) from the Delta of the Orinoco River in Venezuela". The Condor. 115 (1): 143–154. doi:10.1525/cond.2012.110212. S2CID 84646597.
- Bermuda flicker, Colaptes oceanicus:Storrs L. Olson (2013). "Fossil woodpeckers from Bermuda with the description of a new species of Colaptes (Aves: Picidae)". Proceedings of the Biological Society of Washington. 126 (1): 17–24. doi:10.2988/0006-324X-126.1.17. S2CID 84248107.
- Sao Miguel scops owl, Otus frutuosoi : Juan Carlos Rando; Josep Antoni Alcover; Storrs L. Olson; Harald Pieper (2013). "A new species of extinct scops owl (Aves: Strigiformes: Strigidae: Otus) from São Miguel Island (Azores Archipelago, North Atlantic Ocean)". Zootaxa. 3647 (2): 343–357. doi:10.11646/zootaxa.3647.2.6. hdl:10261/85708. PMID 26295111.
- Seram masked owl, Tyto almae:Knud Andreas Jønsson; Michael Køie Poulsen; Tri Haryoko; Andrew Hart Reeve; Pierre-Henri Fabre (2013). "A new species of masked-owl (Aves: Strigiformes: Tytonidae) from Seram, Indonesia". Zootaxa. 3635 (1): 51–61. doi:10.11646/zootaxa.3635.1.5. PMID 26097930.
- Junin tapaculo, Scytalopus gettyae:Peter A. Hosner; Mark B. Robbins; Thomas Valqui & A. Townsend Peterson (2013). "A New Species of Scytalopus Tapaculo (Aves: Passeriformes: Rhinocryptidae) from the Andes of Central Peru". The Wilson Journal of Ornithology. 125 (2): 233–242. doi:10.1676/12-055.1. S2CID 85756230.
- Cambodian tailorbird Orthotomus chaktomuk:Simon Mahood; Ashish John; Hong Chamnan & Colin Poole (2013). "A new species of lowland tailorbird (Passeriformes: Cisticolidae: Orthotomus) from the Mekong floodplain of Cambodia". Forktail. 29: 1–14.
- Tropeiro seedeater, Sporophila beltoni: Márcio Repenning & Carla Suertegaray Fontana (2013). "A new species of gray seedeater (Emberizidae: Sporophila) from upland grasslands of southern Brazil". The Auk. 130 (4): 791–803. doi:10.1525/auk.2013.12167. S2CID 85942537.

The following fifteen Brazilian species are described in the 17th volume of the Handbook of the Birds of the World:

- Western striolated-puffbird, Nystalus obamai
- Xingu woodcreeper, Dendrocolaptes retentus
- Inambari woodcreeper, Lepidocolaptes fatimalimae
- Tupana scythebill, Campylorhamphus gyldenstolpei
- Tapajós scythebill, Campylorhamphus cardosoi
- Roosevelt stipple-throated antwren, Epinecrophylla dentei
- Bamboo antwren, Myrmotherula oreni
- Predicted antwren, Herpsilochmus praedictus
- Aripuana antwren, Herpsilochmus stotzi
- Manicoré warbling antbird, Hypocnemis rondoni
- Chico's tyrannulet, Zimmerius chicomendesi
- Acre tody-tyrant, Hemitriccus cohnhafti
- Sucunduri yellow-margined flycatcher, Tolmomyias sucunduri
- Inambari gnatcatcher, Polioptila attenboroughi
- Campina jay, Cyanocorax hafferi
- Sierra Madre ground warbler Robsonius thompsoni: Peter A. Hosner; Nikki C. Boggess; Phillip Alviola; Luis A. Sánchez-González; Carl H. Oliveros; Rolly Urriza; Robert G. Moyle (2013). "Phylogeography of the Robsonius Ground-Warblers (Passeriformes: Locustellidae) Reveals an Undescribed Species from Northeastern Luzon, Philippines". The Condor. 115 (3): 630–639. doi:10.1525/cond.2013.120124. hdl:1808/14475. S2CID 54028888.
- Guerrero brush-finch Arremon kuehnerii: Adolfo G. Navarro-Sigüenza; Martha A. García-Hernández & A. Townsend Peterson (2013). "A new species of Brush-Finch (Arremon; Emberizidae) from western Mexico". The Wilson Journal of Ornithology. 125 (3): 443–453. doi:10.1676/12-136.1. S2CID 84057064.
- Omani owl Strix omanensis: Magnus Robb; Arnoud B van den Berg & Mark Constantine (2013). "A new species of Strix owl from Oman". Dutch Birding. 35 (5): 275–310.
- New Caledonia snipe, Coenocorypha neocaledonica: Trevor Worthy; Atholl Anderson & Christophe Sand (2013). "An extinct Austral snipe Aves: Coenocorypha from New Caledonia". Emu. 113 (4): 383–393. doi:10.1071/MU13019. S2CID 85169982.

== North America ==
To be completed

== Oceania ==
- An estimated 3 million short-tailed shearwater (Ardenna tenuirostris) died along the Australian coast, as well as unknown numbers at Lord Howe Island and New Zealand. Necropsies on 172 birds found that 96.7% had eaten pumice with some having thirty small pieces in their stomachs. They were underweight and had poor muscle mass, indicating they were unable to feed properly in the Bering Sea. Starvation may have resulted from a pumice raft from a 2012 underwater volcano north-east of New Zealand and a three-year, marine heatwave in the Bering Sea known as The Blob.
