= 2019 in birding and ornithology =

- Years in birding and ornithology: 2016 2017 2018 2019 2020 2021 2022
- Centuries: 20th century · 21st century · 22nd century
- Decades: 1980s 1990s 2000s 2010s 2020s 2030s 2040s
- Years: 2016 2017 2018 2019 2020 2021 2022

See also 2018 in birding and ornithology, main events of 2019 and 2020 in birding and ornithology

The year 2019 in birding and ornithology.

== Worldwide ==
=== New species ===
See also Bird species new to science described in the 2010s

== Asia ==
=== Saudi Arabia ===
- Over 7,000 steppe eagles were found feeding on dead carcasses at two rubbish dumps near, Riyadh; the largest gathering of this endangered species recorded. A dump 6 kilometres (3.7 mi) south-west of Ushaiqer had up to 6,000 of which 60-70% were adults and a second dump 9 kilometres (5.6 mi) from Shaqra had a further 1,200 birds. Threats include electrocution from power lines, poisoned bait put on carcasses to control preditors such as feral dogs, etc. and diclofenac a livestock painkiller but toxic to eagles.

== Europe ==
=== Britain ===
==== Breeding birds ====
- 56 pairs of common crane (Grus grus) recorded bringing the total estimated population to 200 birds – the most in the UK for over 400 years.
- 400 Arctic tern (Sterna paradisaea) chicks fledged from Long Nanny, Northumberland. They first bred here in 1980 and every year since.

== Oceania ==
=== Australia ===
- 2019–20 Australian bushfire season – 77 species and sub-species affected with over a third of their habitat lost. Species include:
  - regent honeyeater (Anthochaera phrygia) – critically endangered; before the fires the estimated population was fewer than 250 birds
  - superb lyrebird (Menura novaehollandiae) – red list status of least concern; loss of over half of its habitat
  - bristlebird – the northern population may have as few as 28 birds
  - glossy black-cockatoo (Calyptorhynchus lathami) – it is estimated that 75% of the subspecies habitat on Kangaroo Island is estimated to have been destroyed
  - southern emu-wren (Stipiturus malachurus) – it is estimated that over 80% of the Kangaroo Island habitat has been destroyed.
- It is estimated that at least 3 billion terrestrial vertebrates were killed or displaced by the fires including 180 million birds.

=== French Polynesia ===
- A three-week expedition in November, to the remote island of Mohotani, one of the Marquesas Islands was undertaken to assess the seabird population and study the behaviour of the Marquesan monarch (Pomarea mendozae). Ground-nesting birds and the forest are under threat from feral cats, rats and sheep, and Mohotani is part of the multi-island restoration programme to secure over 2000 ha of predator-free habitat.

== South America ==
=== Ecuador ===
- Volunteers from Alambi are cultivating 32 species of hummingbird-friendly flowers to replant in degraded habitats of high Andean forests. Ecuador has approximately 130 hummingbird species including the critically endangered, endemic, black-breasted puffleg (Eriocnemis nigrivestis). There are plans by Aves y Conservación to expand the project to Imbabura Province.
