= 2016 in birding and ornithology =

- Years in birding and ornithology: 2013 2014 2015 2016 2017 2018 2019
- Centuries: 20th century · 21st century · 22nd century
- Decades: 1980s 1990s 2000s 2010s 2020s 2030s 2040s
- Years: 2013 2014 2015 2016 2017 2018 2019

See also 2015 in birding and ornithology, main events of 2016 and 2017 in birding and ornithology

The year 2016 in birding and ornithology.

== Worldwide ==
=== New species ===
See also Bird species new to science described in the 2000s

- Himalayan forest thrush (Zoothera salimalii): Alström P.; Rasmussen P.C.; Chao Zhao; Jingzi Xu; Dalvi S.; Tianlong Cai; Yuyan Guan; Kalyakin M.V.; Fumin Lei; Olsson U. (2016). "Integrative taxonomy of the Plain-backed Thrush (Zoothera mollissima) complex (Aves, Turdidae) reveals cryptic species, including a new species". Avian Research. 7 (1): 1–39. doi:10.1186/s40657-016-0037-2.

== Europe ==
=== Britain ===
==== Breeding birds ====
- Reintroduction of the white stork (Ciconia ciconia) began with the aim of a population of at least fifty breeding birds in southern England by 2030. Initially, rehabilitated wild birds from France and Poland will spend the first two years in enclosures.

==== Rare birds ====
- A bearded vulture (Gypaetus barbatus) seen at various sites in Wales and southern England has been placed in Category E by the British Ornithologists' Union Records Committee (BOURC), which lists species as introductions, human-assisted transportees, escapees from captivity, or if breeding populations are not considered self-sustaining.

== North America ==
To be completed

== See also ==
- White stork project
