= 2021 in birding and ornithology =

See also 2020 in birding and ornithology, main events of 2021 and 2022 in birding and ornithology

The year 2021 in birding and ornithology.

== Worldwide ==
=== New species ===
See also Bird species new to science described in the 2020s

== World listings ==
- There are an estimated 50 billion wild birds, but only three species number in the billions and most species are rare. The birds with populations over one billion are house sparrow (Passer domesticus), Common starling (Sturnus vulgaris), and barn swallow (Hirundo rustica); 1180 species number less than 5000 birds each. Twenty-four years ago there was an estimate of 200 to 400 billion undomesticated birds, but the supposed decline is explained by differing methods, using data for more species from citizen science. The report also listed ring-billed gull (Larus delawarensis) as having a population over a billion, but this is an error, with the IUCN citing a population of 2.5 million, not billion.
- Global Search for Lost Birds. The Most Wanted list of birds "lost to science" (launched on 17 December 2021) is an extension of Re:wild's Search for Lost Species programme (launched in 2017). The Most Wanted list is a joint effort between the American Bird Conservancy, BirdLife International, and Re:wild. The top ten listed birds are:
1. Siau scops owl (Otus siaoensis) – last seen in 1866 in Indonesia
2. Himalayan quail (Ophrysia superciliosa) – last seen in 1877 in India
3. Negros fruit dove (Ptilinopus arcanus) – last seen in 1953 in the Philippines
4. Prigogine's nightjar (Caprimulgus prigoginei) – last seen in 1955 in the Democratic Republic of Congo
5. Vilcabamba brushfinch (Atlapetes terborghi) – last seen in 1968 in Peru
6. Dusky tetraka (Crossleyia tenebrosa) – last documented in 1999 in Madagascar
7. South Island kōkako (Callaeas cinereus) – last seen in 2007 in New Zealand
8. Jerdon's courser (Rhinoptilus bitorquatus) – last seen in 2009 in India
9. Cuban kite (Chondrohierax wilsonii) – last seen in 2010 in Cuba
10. Santa Marta sabrewing (Campylopterus phainopeplus) – last seen in 2010 in Colombia

== Europe ==
- The second European Breeding Bird Atlas (EBBA) was published, covering the presence or absence of 596 species, spanning 11 million square metres over 48 countries. Forest species are doing better than farmland birds and grassland, tundra and moorland species are also declining. On average species are spreading north at a rate of 1 km per year, although Bohemian waxwing (Bombycilla garrulus) are bucking the trend.
  - 35% of native birds have increased their breeding ranges in the last thirty years, including cattle egret (Bubulcus ibis), citrine wagtail (Motacilla citreola) and Mediterranean gull (Ichthyaetus melanocephalus)
  - 25% have seen their range decrease including, European roller (Coracias garrulus), great bustard (Otis tarda), ortolan bunting (Emberiza hortulana) and ruff (Calidris pugnax).
  - 40% have seen no change.

=== Britain ===
- Five people were fined for breaching lockdown restrictions by travelling to Exmouth, Devon to see a northern mockingbird (Mimus polyglottos). This was the first record for the Western Palearctic since 1988.
- Landowners in England will need a licence to release non-native pheasants (Phasianus colchicus) and red-legged partridges (Alectoris rufa) within 0.5 km of a protected wildlife site.
- The Curlew Recovery Partnership was launched in England, with the initial aim to reduce the decline of Eurasian curlew (Numenius arquata). Populations have declined by 50% in the last 25 years and the current UK population is 58,000 breeding pairs. Actions include protecting nests from predators and compensation to farmers to delay mowing fields. Similar schemes are already in place in Northern Ireland, Scotland and Wales.
- An Egyptian vulture (Neophron percnopterus), seen on St Mary's, Isles of Scilly and Tresco, is the first sighting (if confirmed by the British Ornithologists' Union) in the UK since 1868.
- Common crane (Grus grus) had their most successful breeding year in the UK since the 17th-century, with an estimated population of more than 200 birds. Of the 72 breeding pairs, up to 65 bred with forty fledged chicks. As well as eastern England and Somerset cranes have been seen at the Loch of Strathbeg reserve.

==== Other events ====
- The 2021 Birdfair at Rutland Water was cancelled due to the COVID-19 pandemic.

=== Spain ===
- A young cinereous vulture (Aegypius monachus) has died of diclofenac poisoning in the Boumort National Hunting Reserve. The anti-inflammatory agent diclofenac, despite being banned in some Asian countries, has been approved for use in Spain and other European countries. Before being banned in Asia tens of millions of vultures are believed to have been killed by feeding on carcasses treated with the drug. The drug was approved because it was argued that cattle carcasses are disposed of differently in Europe than in Asia, and vultures would not be affected.

== North America ==
=== Canada ===
- British Columbia (BC) temporarily halts logging in old-growth forests where the only three known northern spotted owl (Strix occidentalis caurina) live. Before the introduction of industrial logging it is estimated that there were up to 500 breeding pairs. There are currently twenty-nine owls (including nine breeding females) in outdoor aviaries near Vancouver and the target is 125 breeding pairs in the wild. As well as BC, the birds are found in northern California, Oregon and Washington and they are listed in the US as a threatened species under the Endangered Species Act.

=== USA ===
- With the collaboration of the Yurok and Redwood National Park, a captive breeding programme plans to reintroduce the California condor (Gymnogyps californianus) to northern California. Since reintroduction to south and central California, an estimated population of more than 300 free-flying birds have expanded into parts of Arizona, Baja California, and Utah.
- Since 1994, over 200 bald eagle (Haliaeetus leucocephalus) have died – all living near artificial lakes and all diagnosed with vacuolar myelinopathy, which causes holes in the spinal cord and brain. The eagles were eating easy to catch, weak and uncoordinated fish and water birds. The weakened prey were associated with water-thyme (Elodea canadensis) which contained bromine, an element which, while not uncommon in nature, is rare in fresh water. The water-thyme leaves had almost 1000 times more bromide than was in the water. The source of bromide in the lakes is unknown.
- Between 2014 and 2018, 303 golden eagle and bald eagle were tested at the University of Georgia to determine the cause of their deaths. Of the 133 birds tested for the most common rat poison, anticoagulant rodenticide, 82% of the birds had it in their body and 4% died as a direct result. There was also a high-prevalence of highly toxic, second-generation anticoagulant rodenticides, which can remain active for months after ingestion.
- In late May 2021, wildlife managers in some Eastern States began receiving reports of sick and dying fledgling songbirds with eye swelling and crusty discharge, as well as neurological signs. No definitive cause has been determined.

== Oceania ==
=== New Zealand ===
- By spreading concoctions of bird pheromones around nest sites in the weeks before the arrival of the birds, research by Manaaki Whenua – Landcare Research shows that introduced predators can be fooled into ignoring those nesting birds. Some mammals use olfaction to search for food and if the search is unrewarding they lose interest in the odour. The effect does wear off after approximately thirty days but the birds produced 170% more chicks than those on untreated sites.
