= 2014 in birding and ornithology =

See also 2013 in birding and ornithology, main events of 2014 and 2015 in birding and ornithology

The year 2014 in birding and ornithology.

== Worldwide ==
=== New species ===
See also Bird species new to science described in the 2000s

- São Paulo marsh antwren (Formicivora paludicola) (the last issue of RBO 21, from "Dec 2013", was released only in March 2014)
- Wakatobi flowerpecker (Dicaeum kuehni)
- Cryptic treehunter (Cichlocolaptes mazarbarnetti)
- Bahian mouse-colored tapaculo (Scytalopus gonzagai)
- Sulawesi streaked flycatcher (Muscicapa sodhii)

== North America ==
- An estimated 365 million to 968 million birds are killed every year in collisions with buildings; 140,000 to 328,000 are killed by wind turbines and thousands by civilian aircraft.
