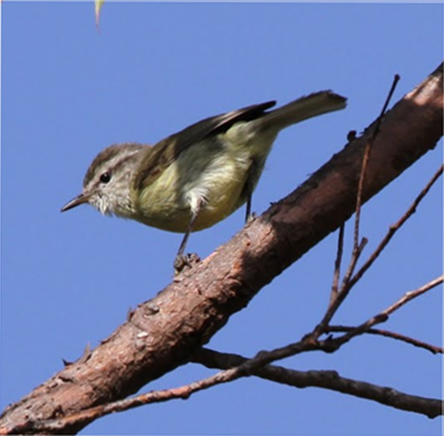

Conservation status
- Least Concern (IUCN 3.1)

Scientific classification
- Kingdom: Animalia
- Phylum: Chordata
- Class: Aves
- Order: Passeriformes
- Family: Phylloscopidae
- Genus: Phylloscopus
- Species: P. presbytes

Binomial name
- Phylloscopus presbytes (Blyth, 1870)

= Timor leaf warbler =

Species of bird

The Timor leaf warbler (Phylloscopus presbytes) is a species of Old World warbler in the family Phylloscopidae. It is found on the islands of Timor and Flores in the Lesser Sunda Islands. Its closest relative is the Rote leaf warbler.

== Taxonomy ==
The Timor leaf warbler was formally described in 1870 as Sylvia presbytes by the English zoologist Edward Blyth based on a specimen collected on the island of Timor. The specific epithet is from Ancient Greek πρεσβυτης/presbutēs meaning "old man". The Timor leaf warbler is now one of 80 species placed in the genus Phylloscopus that was introduced in 1826 by Friedrich Boie.

Two subspecies are recognised:

- P. p. presbytes (Blyth, E, 1870) – Timor (eastern Lesser Sunda Islands)
- P. p. floresianus (Dickinson, EC & Christidis, L, 2014) – Flores (western Lesser Sunda Islands)

The subspecies P. p. floresianus has sometimes been considered as a separate species, the Flores leaf warbler. The two subspecies have similar plumage and vocalizations, but have modest differences in their mitochondrial DNA sequences. The Timor leaf warbler is most closely related to the Rote leaf warbler (Phylloscopus rotiensis).
