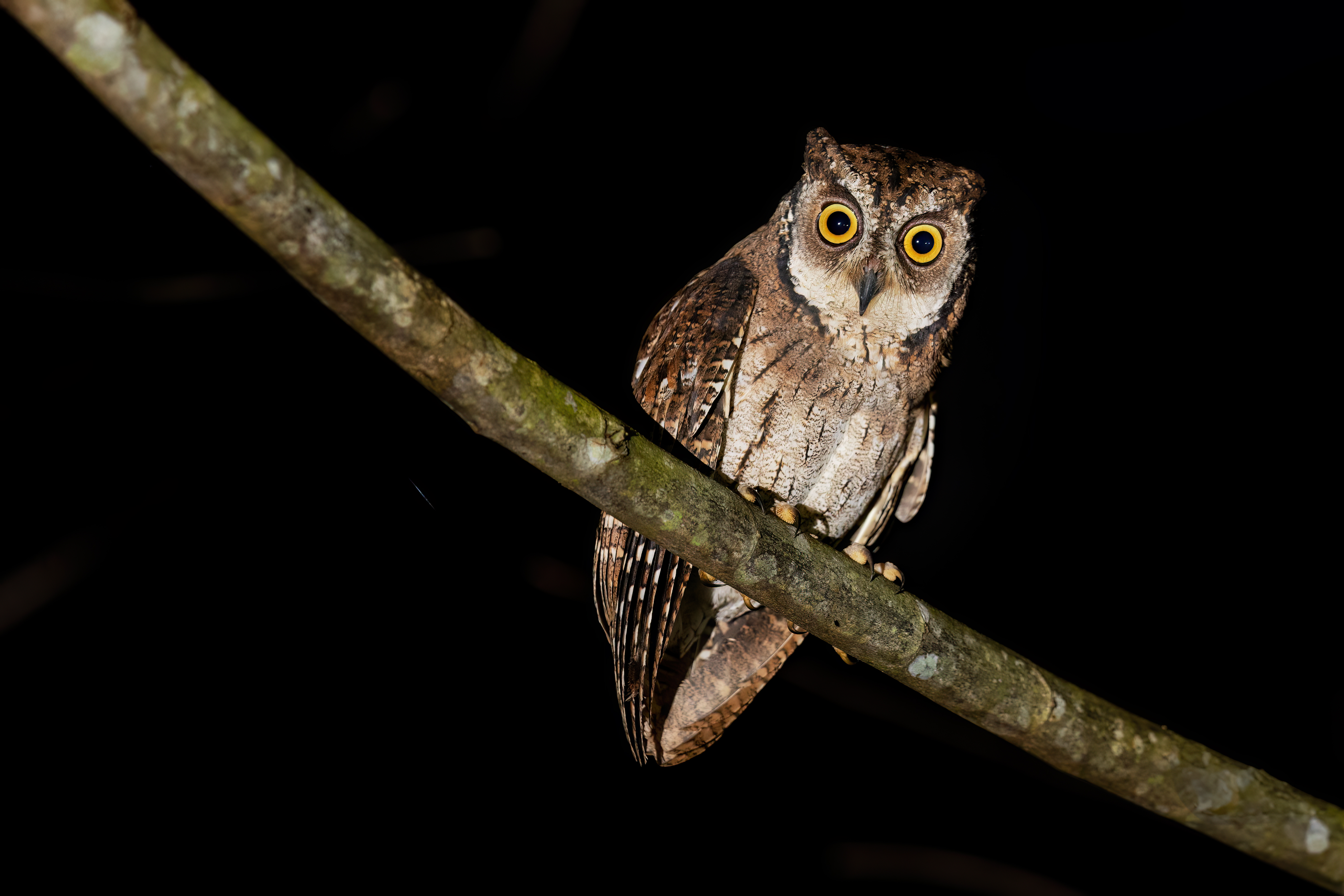

Conservation status
- Least Concern (IUCN 3.1)
- CITES Appendix II

Scientific classification
- Kingdom: Animalia
- Phylum: Chordata
- Class: Aves
- Order: Strigiformes
- Family: Strigidae
- Genus: Otus
- Species: O. magicus

Binomial name
- Otus magicus (Müller, 1841)

= Moluccan scops owl =

Species of owl

The Moluccan scops owl (Otus magicus) is an owl found in the Maluku and Lesser Sunda Islands of Indonesia. It closely resembles the Rinjani scops owl.

The following subspecies are recognised:

- O. m. kalidupae (Hartert, EJO, 1903) - Kaledupa
- O. m. morotensis (Sharpe, 1875) - Morotai
- O. m. leucospilus (Gray, GR, 1861) - Halmahera, Ternate, Kasiruta, and Bacan
- O. m. obira Jany, 1955 - Obi
- O. m. bouruensis (Sharpe, 1875) - Buru
- O. m. magicus (Müller, S, 1841) - Seram and Ambon
- O. m. albiventris (Sharpe, 1875) - west-central Lesser Sundas

The Wetar scops owl (O. tempestatis) was previously considered a subspecies, but has since been split.

It has spiritual significance to the Pesaguan Dayak people. It is believed to be a sign of misfortune, as its sound is said to be reminiscent of death. This belief may protect the species from being hunted.
