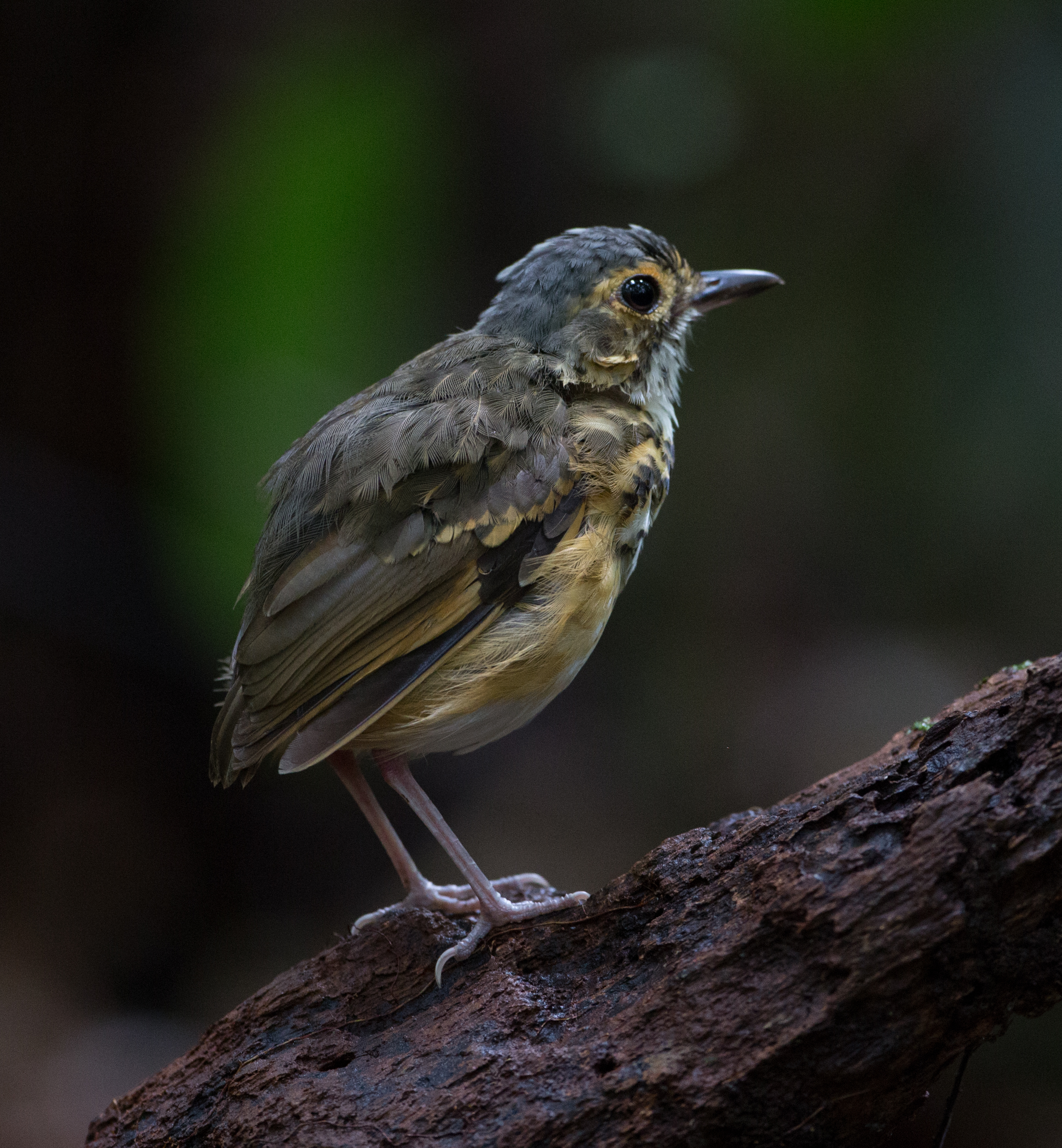

Conservation status
- Least Concern (IUCN 3.1) -->

Scientific classification
- Kingdom: Animalia
- Phylum: Chordata
- Class: Aves
- Order: Passeriformes
- Family: Grallariidae
- Genus: Hylopezus
- Species: H. macularius

Binomial name
- Hylopezus macularius (Temminck, 1830)

= Spotted antpitta =

Species of bird

The spotted antpitta (Hylopezus macularius) is a species of bird in the family Grallariidae. It is found in Brazil, Colombia, French Guiana, Guyana, Peru, Suriname, and Venezuela.

== Taxonomy and systematics ==
The spotted antpitta's taxonomy is unsettled. The IOC, the Clements taxonomy, and the South American Classification Committee of the American Ornithological Society assign the spotted antpitta two subspecies, the nominate H. m. macularius (Temminck, 1830) and H. m. dilutis (Hellmayr, 1910). They previously considered what are now the masked antpitta (H. auricularis) and Snethlage's antpitta (H. paraensis) as subspecies. They recognized the first of them as a species following a 1998 publication and the second after a study published in 2012.

BirdLife International's Handbook of the Birds of the World (HBW) implemented the split of the masked antpitta. However, as of late 2024 it has retained H. paraensis as a subspecies of the spotted antpitta. It also recognizes H. (macularius) whittakeri as a spotted antpitta subspecies. The other taxonomies recognize it as the Alta Floresta antpitta.

This article follows the two-subspecies model.

== Description ==
The spotted antpitta is about 14 cm (5.5 in) long and weighs 43 to 53 g (1.5 to 1.9 oz). The sexes have the same plumage. Adults of the nominate subspecies have orange-buff lores and a ring of the same color around the eye. Their ear coverts are olive-brown with a black streak below them. Their forehead, crown, and nape are dark gray. Their upperparts and tail are olive-brown. Their wings are mostly brownish with orange-buff bases and outer edges on the primaries and olive-brown edges on the secondaries. Their wing coverts are mostly brownish with wide orange-buff edges. They have a wide white "moustache" with a wide black stripe below it. Their chin and throat are white with a black line down from the bill. Their underparts are mostly pale ochraceous or buffy-white with many short black streaks on the breast. Their sides, flanks, and undertail coverts are orangey-buff. Subspecies H. m. dilutis has a more brownish back than the nominate and flanks that are olivaceous-washed dull ochraceous-yellow. Both subspecies have a dark brown iris, a black maxilla, a pink mandible with a black tip, and pinkish brown to pale gray brown legs and feet.

== Distribution and habitat ==
The nominate subspecies of the spotted antpitta is found from eastern Bolívar state in northeastern Venezuela east through the Guianas and northeastern Brazil, all north of the Amazon and east of the Branco and Negro rivers. Subspecies H. m. dilutis is found from central Amazonas state in southern Venezuela, in extreme southeastern Colombia, in northeastern Peru, and in the Negro River basin in northwestern Brazil. (Note that the map also includes the ranges of Snethlage's and Alta Floresta antpittas.) The species inhabits the floor and undergrowth of mature forest, both terra firme and gallery forest. It is a bird of the lowlands, reaching only 300 m (1,000 ft) in Colombia and 500 m (1,600 ft) in Venezuela.

== Behavior ==
=== Movement ===
The spotted antpitta is believed to be resident throughout its range.

=== Feeding ===
The spotted antpitta's diet has not been detailed but is known to include insects. It forages mostly on the ground where it probes and flicks leaf litter and soil to find prey. It is usually seen singly and sometimes in pairs.

=== Breeding ===
The spotted antpitta's breeding season has not been defined but includes at least April to June. The two known nests had an outer structure made from twigs and dead leaves with a shallow inner cup made of finer materials. In one nest the up was rootlets and in the other thin woody leaf stems. Both were built on top of a horizontal palm frond; one was 75 cm (2.5 ft) and the other 82 cm (2.7 ft) above the ground. One of them contained two eggs that were pale greenish cream with brown and beige speckles. Both parents incubated the clutch. The incubation period, time to fledging, and other details of parental care are not known.

=== Vocalization ===
The songs of the two spotted antpitta subspecies differ somewhat. Both have six notes but that of H. dilutus is shorter than the nominate's. The nominate's has been written as "whoa-whoa-wok-whoa-wok-wok" and that of dilutus as "hoor-hoor-hoor-hoor-ho-ho".

== Status ==
The IUCN follows HBW taxonomy so its assessment of H. macularius includes both Snethlage's and the Alta Floresta antpittas. It is considered "local and uncommon" in Colombia, "[u]ncommon and apparently very local" in Venezuela, and "poorly known" in Peru. It occurs in many protected areas, but it "is one of many forest understory insectivores that quickly disappears from small fragments".
