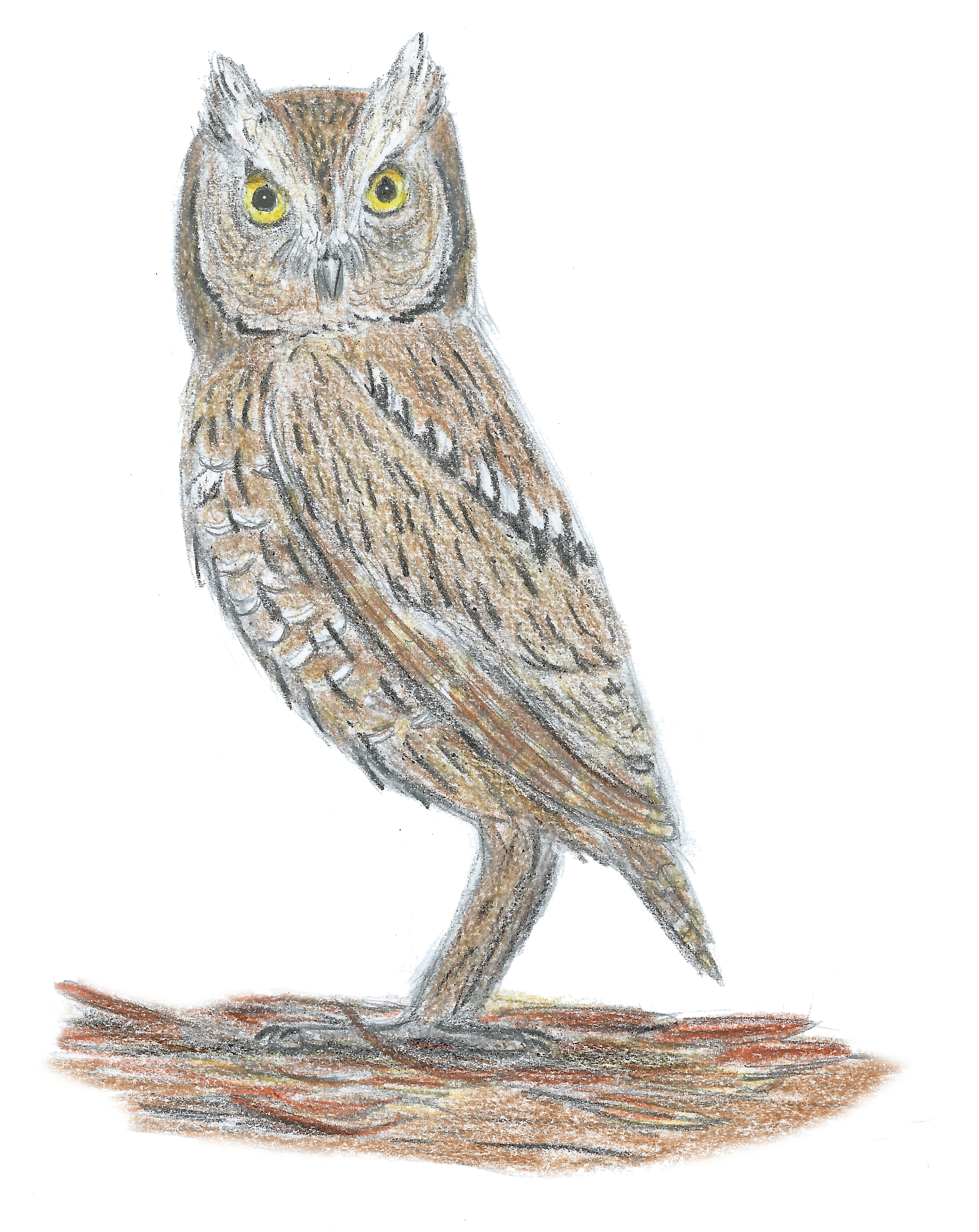
- Hypothetical restoration based on known material and relatives

Conservation status
- Extinct

Scientific classification
- Kingdom: Animalia
- Phylum: Chordata
- Class: Aves
- Order: Strigiformes
- Family: Strigidae
- Genus: Otus
- Species: †O. mauli

Binomial name
- †Otus mauli Rando, Pieper, Alcover & Olson, 2012

= Madeiran scops owl =

Madeiran scops owl Temporal range: Quaternary

Extinct species of bird

The Madeiran scops owl (Otus mauli) is a small extinct owl that once inhabited the island of Madeira in the Macaronesian archipelago off the north-west coast of Africa in the North Atlantic Ocean.

== History ==
Fossil bones of the owl were found in Quaternary sites on Madeira. It is the first extinct owl species to be described from Macaronesia. The describers suggest that the most likely cause of extinction was human settlement in the early 15th century, with its associated habitat destruction and the introduction of alien species. Similar, though more fragmentary, remains were also found on the neighbouring island of Porto Santo, which may be of the same, or a closely related, species.

== Description ==
The owl was similar in size to the Eurasian scops owl, though the leg bones were longer. Estimates of its body weight and wing loading suggest that it was largely ground-dwelling.

The extinct São Miguel scops owl was similar but differs from the Madeiran species by the smaller size of many of its bones, especially the ulna and tibiotarsus.
