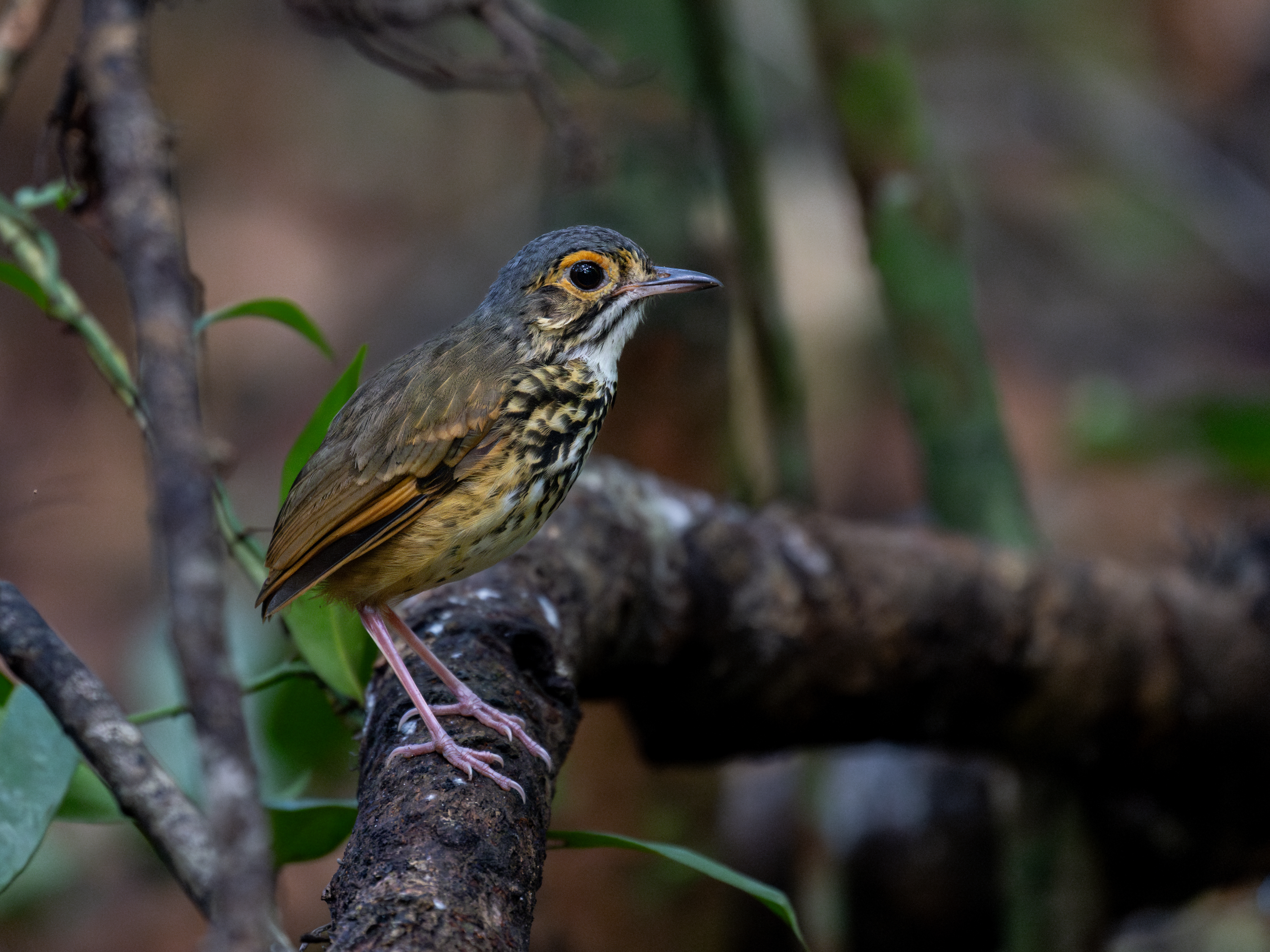

Scientific classification
- Kingdom: Animalia
- Phylum: Chordata
- Class: Aves
- Order: Passeriformes
- Family: Grallariidae
- Genus: Hylopezus
- Species: H. whittakeri

Binomial name
- Hylopezus whittakeri Carneiro et al., 2012

= Alta Floresta antpitta =

Species of bird in Brazil

The Alta Floresta antpitta (Hylopezus whittakeri) is a species of bird in the family Grallariidae. It is endemic to Brazil.

== Taxonomy and systematics ==
The Alta Floresta antpitta was described for science in 2012 as part of a revision of the taxonomy of the spotted antpitta (Hylopezus macularius). It had earlier been recognized as distinct but was thought to be part of Snethlage's antpitta (H. paraensis). Following the 2012 publication, the IOC, the Clements taxonomy, and the South American Classification Committee of the American Ornithological Society recognized the new species. However, as of late 2024 BirdLife International's Handbook of the Birds of the World (HBW) treats it as a subspecies of the spotted antpitta.

The Alta Floresta antpitta is monotypic.

== Description ==
The Alta Floresta antpitta is about 14 cm (5.5 in) long and weighs about 40 to 47 g (1.4 to 1.7 oz). The sexes have the same plumage. Adults have buffy-orange lores and ring around the eye with a thin black crescent between them. Their ear coverts are speckled with blackish, grayish, and buff and have a black streak below them. Their forehead, crown, and nape are dark gray with blackish streaks at its lower edge. Their upperparts are olive-brown. Their wings are mostly olive-brown with a black rectangle and buffy bars showing on the coverts. They have a white "moustache" with a black stripe below it. Their throat is creamy white with a black line down from the bill. Their underparts are mostly creamy white with a buffy-cinnamon wash on their sides and flanks. Their breast has black flecks that diminish towards its lower end, their flanks, and belly. They have a dark brown iris, a gray-black maxilla, a pinkish mandible with a grayish outer third, and pale purple-pink legs and feet.

== Distribution and habitat ==
The Alta Floresta antpitta is found in the Amazon Basin of south-central Brazil, south of the Amazon between the Madeira and Xingu rivers. Its range includes parts of the states of Pará, Amazonas, Rondônia, and Mato Grosso. It inhabits humid lowland terra firme forest, where it favors swampy or flooded areas. It appears to be most numerous along watercourses and around gaps in the forest such as those caused by fallen trees. At the southern end of its range it also occurs in drier transitional forest.

== Behavior ==
=== Movement ===
The Alta Floresta antpitta is believed to be resident throughout its range.

=== Feeding ===
The Alta Floresta antpitta's diet and foraging behavior are not known. They are assumed to be similar to those of other members of its genus, whose diet is invertebrates and small vertebrates.

=== Breeding ===
The only known nest of the Alta Floresta antpitta was found in December 2009, though at the time the bird sitting in it was identified as a black-spotted bare-eye (Phlegopsis nigromaculata). From photographs taken at the time, the nest was a cup made from fairly heavy sticks intertwined with vines between two saplings. It was about 60 cm (2 ft) above the ground. Nothing else is known about the Alta Floresta antpitta's breeding biology.

=== Vocalization ===
The Alta Floresta antpitta's song is "composed of 5 (rarely 4 or 6) whistled notes with identical shapes, in which the second and third notes are separated by an unusually long interval".

== Status ==
The IUCN follows HBW taxonomy so it has not assessed Snethlage's antpitta separately from the spotted antpitta. "Like other members of the Spotted Antpitta group, this species appears quite sensitive to habitat loss, fragmentation and perturbation [and] is also thought to be fairly sensitive to edges created by roads." It does occur in at least five protected areas.
