= 2022 in birding and ornithology =

See also 2020 in birding and ornithology, main events of 2021 and 2022 in birding and ornithology

The year 2022 in birding and ornithology.

== Worldwide ==
=== New species ===
See also Bird species new to science described in the 2020s
- New Caledonian storm petrel
- Meratus white-eye
- Meratus blue flycatcher
- Inti tanager
- Ruvu weaver

==== Deaths ====
- Walter Joseph Bock - January 27
