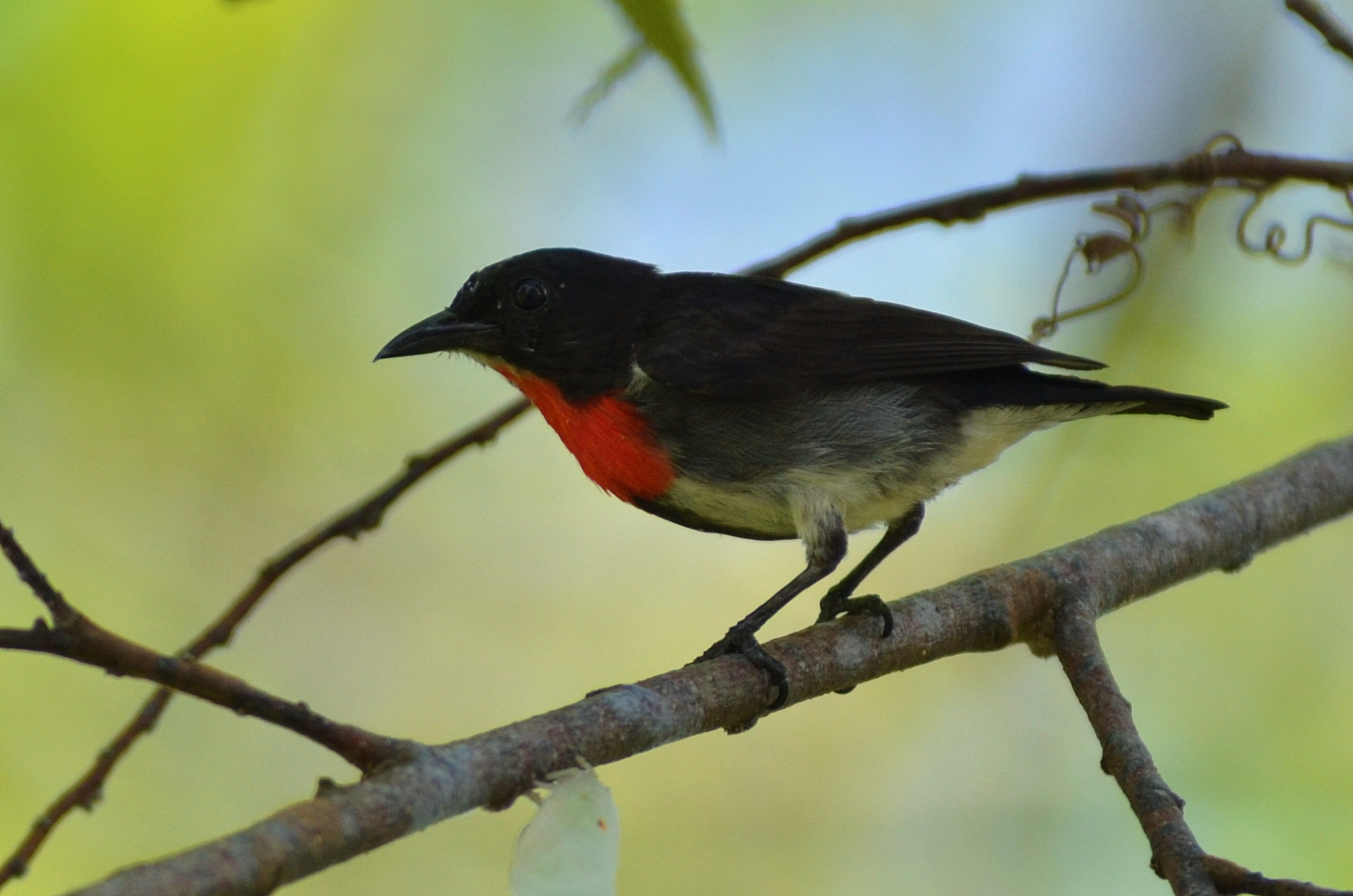
- Male at Manado, North Sulawesi

Conservation status
- Least Concern (IUCN 3.1)

Scientific classification
- Kingdom: Animalia
- Phylum: Chordata
- Class: Aves
- Order: Passeriformes
- Family: Dicaeidae
- Genus: Dicaeum
- Species: D. celebicum

Binomial name
- Dicaeum celebicum Müller, 1843

= Grey-sided flowerpecker =

Species of bird

The grey-sided flowerpecker (Dicaeum celebicum) is a species of bird in the family Dicaeidae. It is endemic to Indonesia. Its natural habitats are subtropical or tropical moist lowland forest and subtropical or tropical moist montane forest.

== Taxonomy and systematics ==
The grey-sided flowerpecker has five subspecies recognized:

- D. c. talautense - Meyer, AB & Wiglesworth, 1895: Endemic to Talaud Islands
- D. c. sanghirense - Salvadori, 1876: Endemic to Sangihe and Siau Island
- D. c. celebicum - Müller, S, 1843: Endemic to Sulawesi, Manadotua, Bangka, Lembeh, Togian, Muna and Butung
- D. c. sulaense - Sharpe, 1884: Endemic to Sula Islands and Banggai Islands
- Wakatobi flowerpecker (D. c. kuehni) - Hartert, 1903: Considered by some authorities as a separate species. Found in the Wakatobi archipelago (south-east of Sulawesi)

== Gallery ==
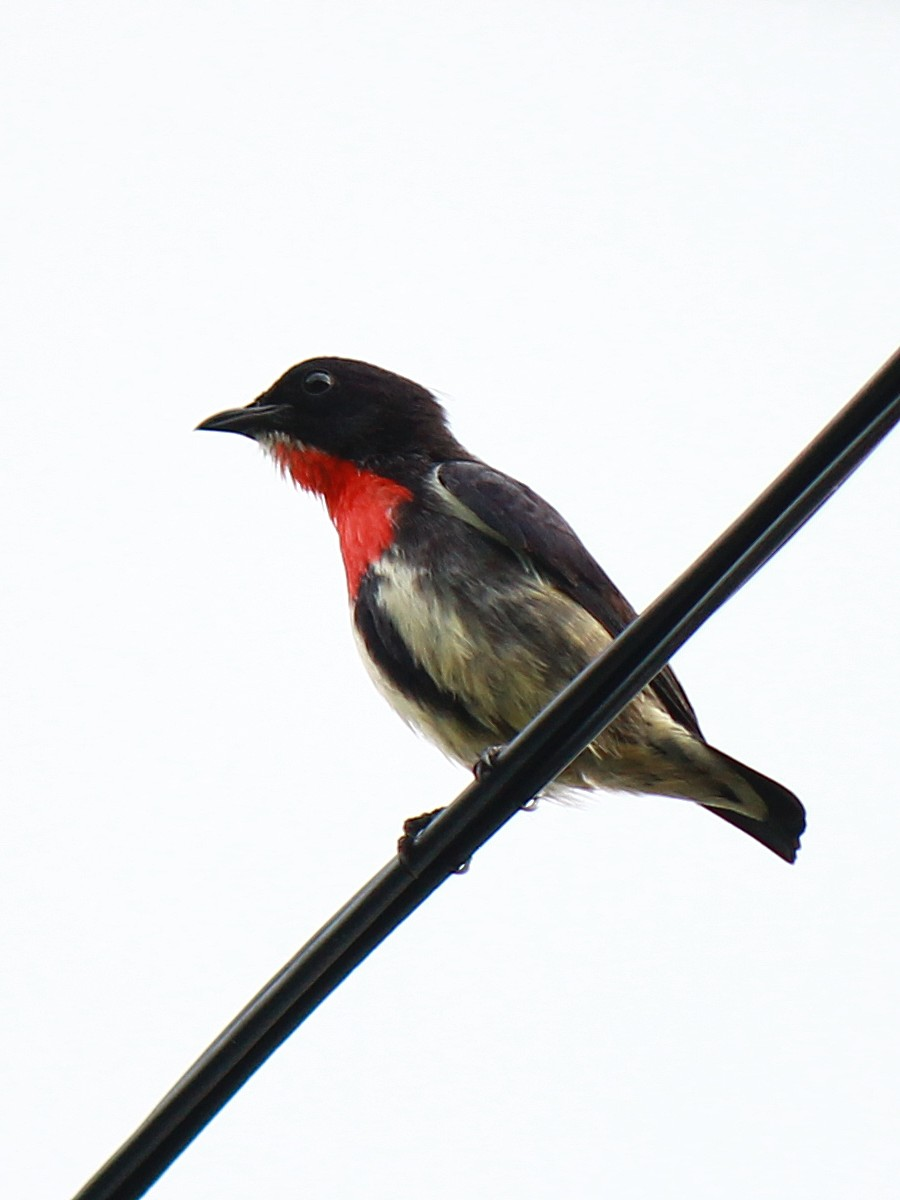
Male

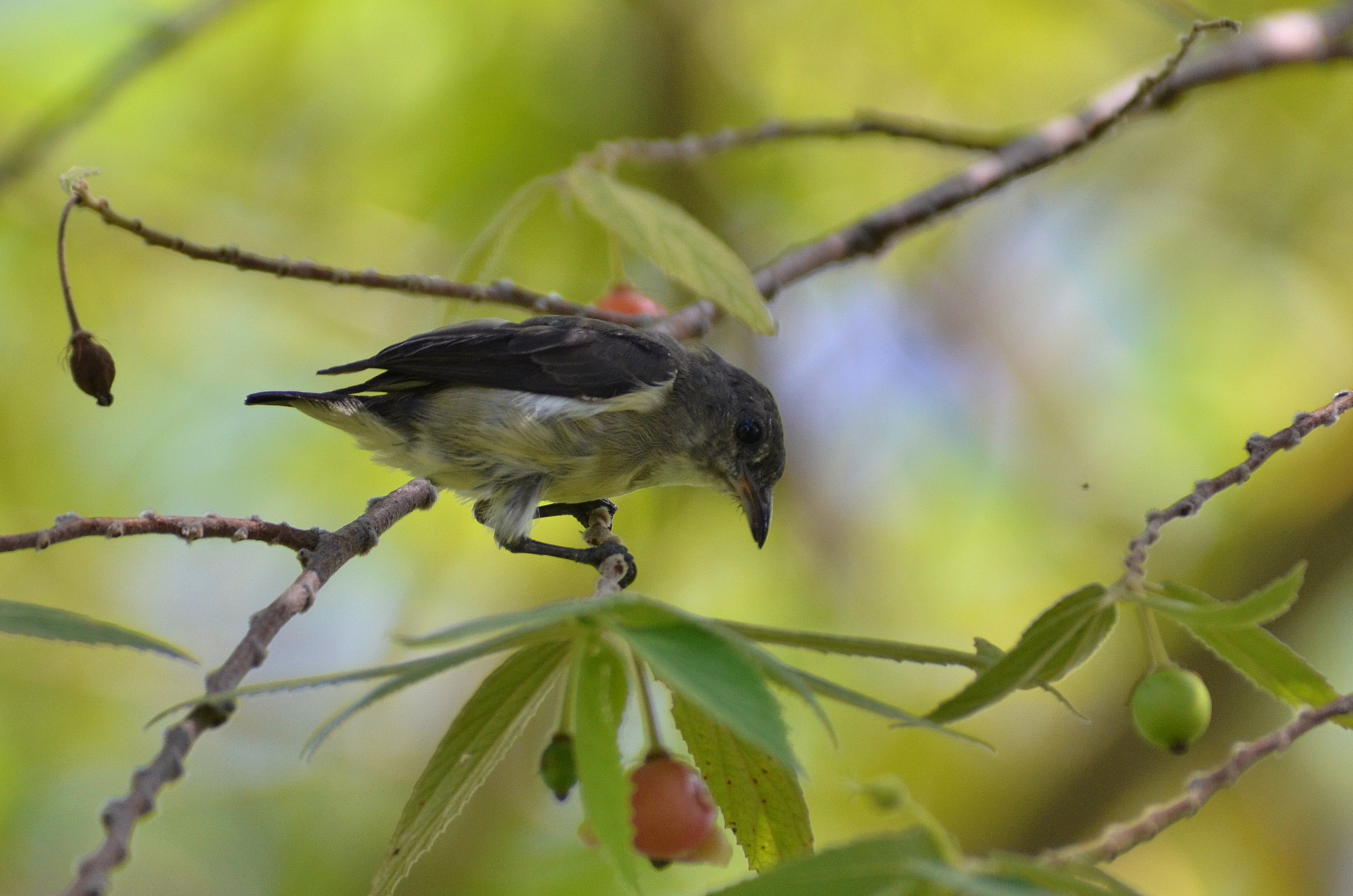
Juvenile

feeding on Muntingia calabura fruit

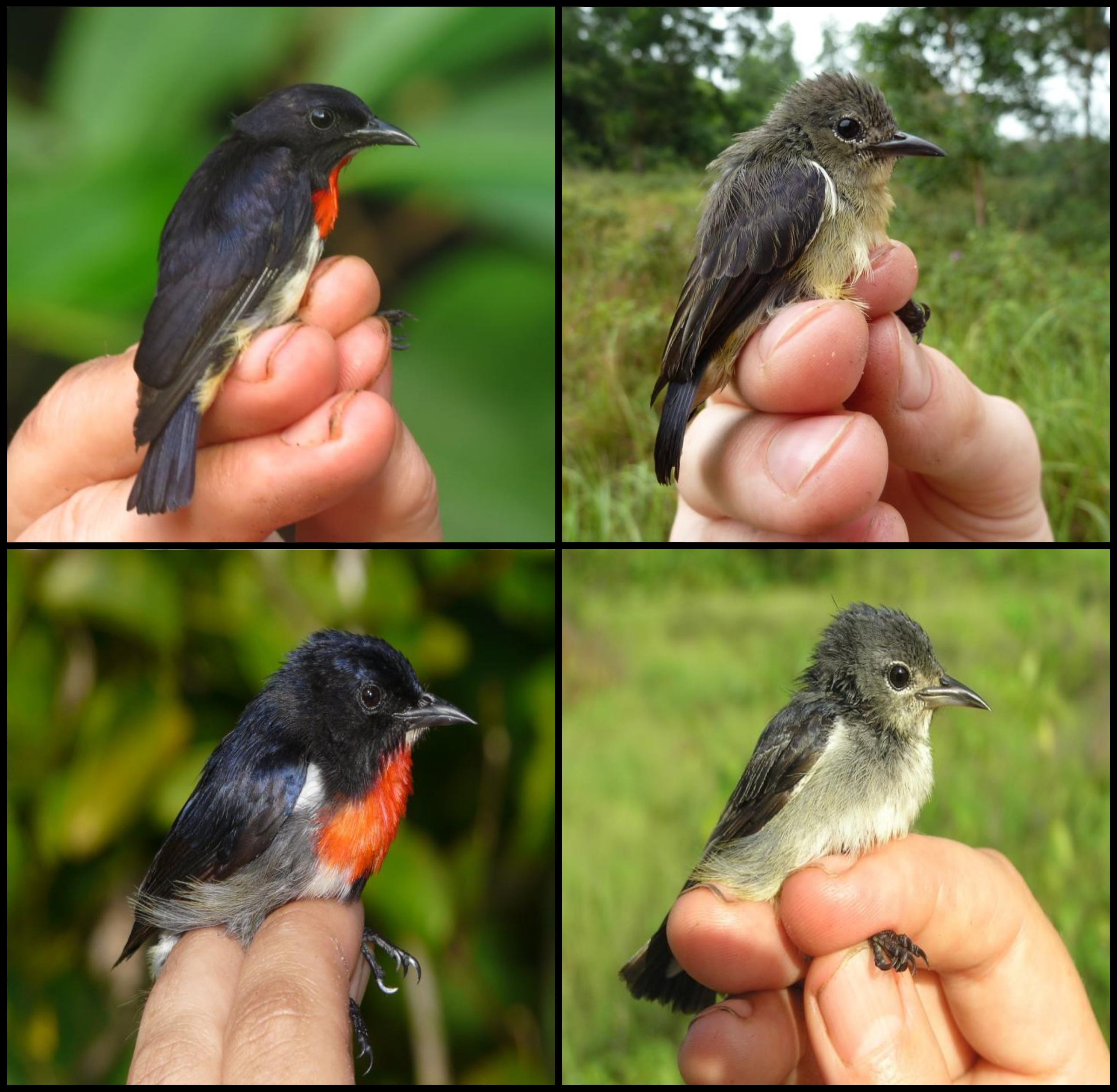
Compared to Dicaeum kuehni
