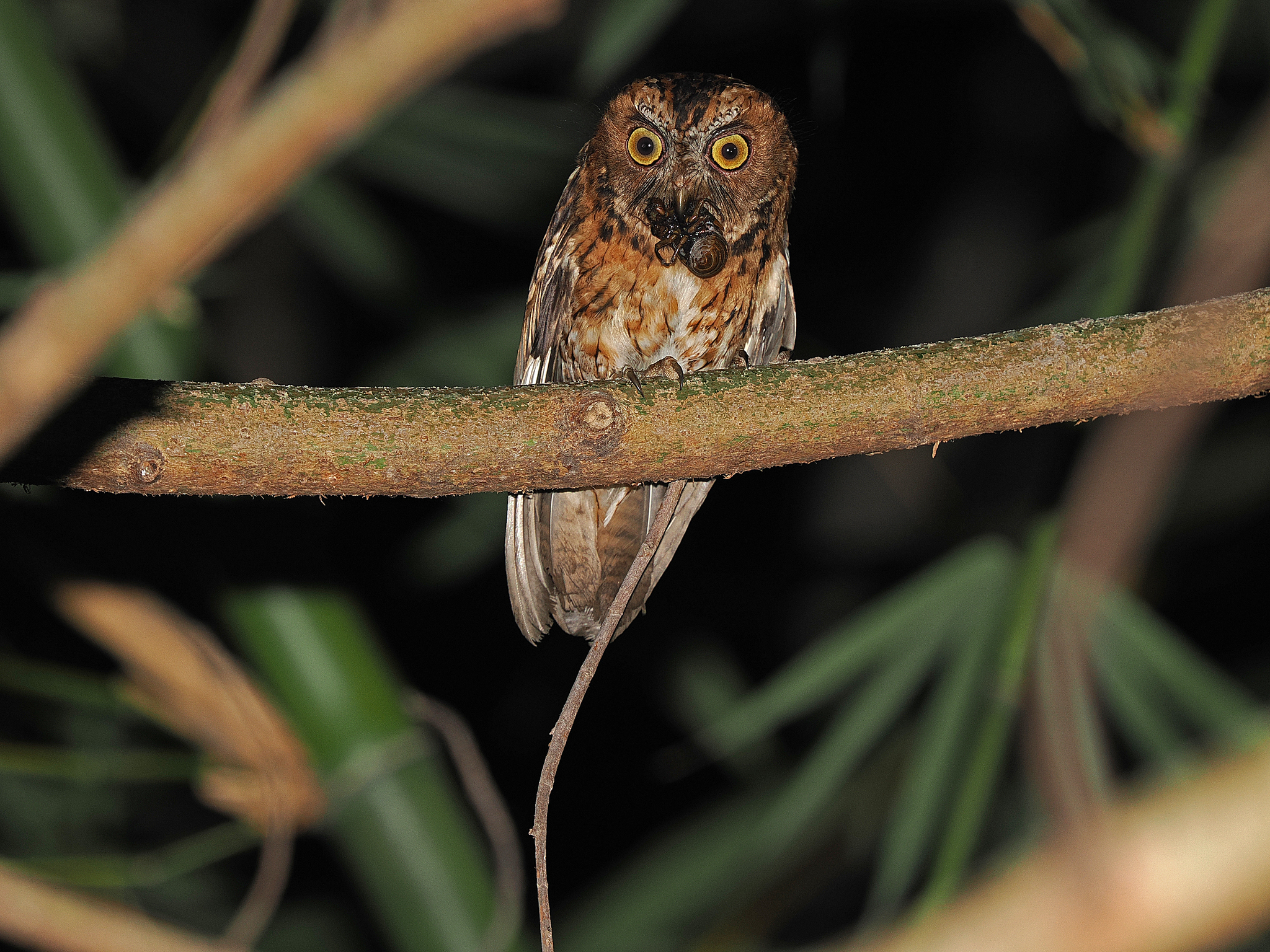

Conservation status
- Least Concern (IUCN 3.1)

Scientific classification
- Kingdom: Animalia
- Phylum: Chordata
- Class: Aves
- Order: Strigiformes
- Family: Strigidae
- Genus: Otus
- Species: O. tempestatis

Binomial name
- Otus tempestatis (Hartert, 1904)

Synonyms
- Otus magicus tempestatis

= Wetar scops owl =

Species of owl

The Wetar scops owl (Otus tempestatis) is an owl endemic to Wetar of the Maluku Islands of Indonesia. It was previously considered a subspecies of the Moluccan scops owl (O. magicus), but was split as a distinct species by the IUCN Red List and BirdLife International in 2014, and the International Ornithological Congress followed suit in 2022.
