= 2018 in birding and ornithology =

See also 2017 in birding and ornithology, main events of 2018 and 2019 in birding and ornithology

The year 2018 in birding and ornithology.

== Worldwide ==
=== New species ===
See also Bird species new to science described in the 2010s

== Europe ==
- European turtle dove (Streptopelia turtur) – a ten-year Turtle Dove Action Plan was launched across its African and European range in May. Since 1980 it has declined by 78% across Europe.

=== Britain ===
The British Ornithologists' Union British list stands at 616 species (Category A: 598; Category B: 8; Category C: 10).

==== Breeding birds ====
- Common crane (Grus grus) – 54 pairs raised 25 young to bring the UK population to around 180.

==== Rare birds ====
- Grey catbird (Dumetella carolinensis) – first seen on 15 October at Treve Common, near Land's End, Cornwall. The second UK record.

==== Other events ====
- The 2018 British Birdwatching Fair raised £322,000, making a total of £4,679,152 since its inception in 1989. The money donated to Birdlife International will go towards protecting Mar Chiquita in Argentina.

== South America ==
=== Argentina ===
- Mar Chiquita – money raised by the 2018 British Birdwatching Fair will help with the creation of Argentina's largest national park. BirdLife International working with Aves Argentinas will protect three species of flamingo at the largest salt lake in South America and the fifth largest in the world.
