= Walter Joseph Bock =

American ornithologist (1933–2022)

- Born: November 20, 1933; Queens, New York
- Died: January 27, 2022 (aged 88)
- Scientific career
- Fields: Evolutionary Biology, Ornithology
- Workplaces: Goethe University, University of Illinois at Urbana-Champaign, Columbia University
- Thesis: (1959)
- Doctoral advisor: Ernst Mayr

Walter Joseph Bock (November 20, 1933 – January 27, 2022) was an American evolutionary biologist and ornithologist. Bock was a professor of evolutionary biology at Columbia University from 1973 until his retirement.

== Biography ==
Bock was born in Queens, New York to Paul and Anne Bock née Kalsch who migrated to the US from Pfalz near Kaiserslautern. After elementary school he joined the Brooklyn Technical High School. During his high school days he volunteered at the American Museum of Natural History where he was influenced by Dean Amadon.

He received a BS from Cornell University in 1955, an MA from Harvard in 1957 and a PhD from Harvard in 1959 under Ernst Mayr. His dissertation was on the palatine process of the premaxilla in the Passeres. After a postdoctoral fellowship at the Goethe University Frankfurt with Dietrich Starck he became an assistant professor at the University of Illinois at Urbana-Champaign in 1961. In 1965 he moved to Columbia University and became a professor in 1973. His lab which produced eleven doctoral students worked mainly on evolution and morphology. He published more than 300 papers on avian evolution, systematics and biological philosophy. Bock served as a permanent secretary of the International Ornithological Committee from 1986 and was actively involved in promoting international collaboration in ornithology.

Bock received the Elliott Coues Award of the American Ornithologists' Union in 1975.
