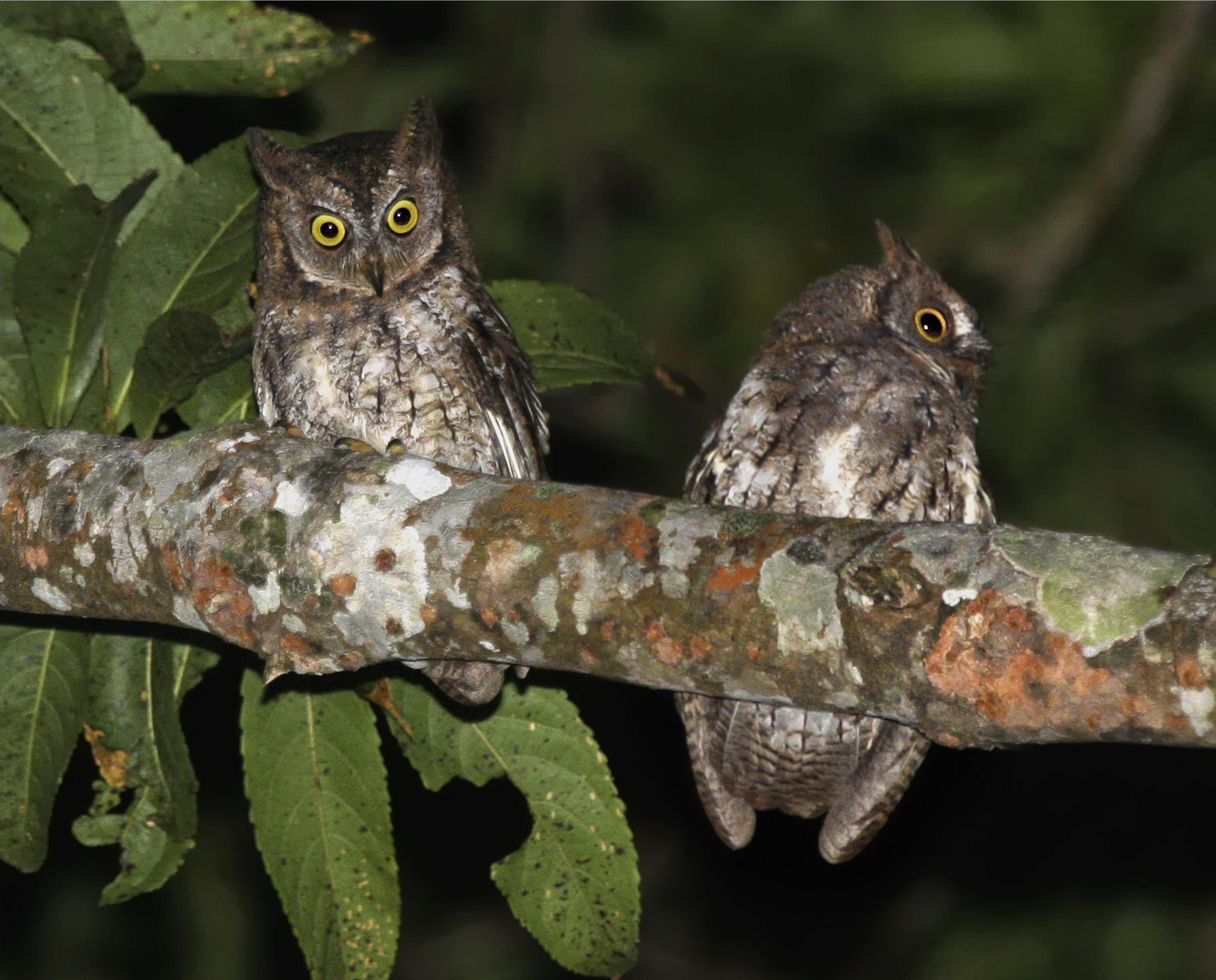
- Two Rinjani scops owls perched on a branch

Conservation status
- Near Threatened (IUCN 3.1)
- CITES Appendix II

Scientific classification
- Kingdom: Animalia
- Phylum: Chordata
- Class: Aves
- Order: Strigiformes
- Family: Strigidae
- Genus: Otus
- Species: O. jolandae

Binomial name
- Otus jolandae Sangster et al., 2013

Audio
- Song recorded by George Sangster, the person who described the owl

= Rinjani scops owl =

Species of owl

The Rinjani scops owl (Otus jolandae) is a species of scops owl found only on Lombok in the Lesser Sunda Islands of Indonesia and its neighbouring Gili Islands. The only bird species endemic to the island, it was first recognized as a separate species in September 2003 and was formally described in 2013.

== Etymology ==
The specific epithet jolandae honours Dr Jolanda Luksenburg, a biologist who codiscovered the species in 2003. Both the English common name and proposed Indonesian name Celepuk Rinjani refer to Mount Rinjani, the 3700 m active volcano that dominates Lombok. The owls are also known locally as burung pok, referring onomatopoeically to the call.

== Description and identification ==
As with most other Otus owls, the Rinjani scops owl is mainly brown in colour, barred and spotted in various shades with white. It is largely similar in appearance to the Moluccan scops owl, O. magicus, but has a different call, a clean whistling hoot rather than the raspy croak of O. magicus.

== History ==
Seven specimens of the owl were obtained from May to July in 1896 by British naturalist Alfred Everett, who also used paid local collectors. However, at that time, the bird was not recognised as being specifically distinct from the Moluccan scops owl, which occurs on other islands in the Lesser Sundas. The Everett specimens are held in the British Natural History Museum (including the holotype) and the American Museum of Natural History.

In September 2003 George Sangster and Jolanda Luksenburg saw, and recorded vocalisations of, scops owls on Lombok. In the same month Ben King did so as well. Both parties independently concluded that the calls differed substantially from those of O. magicus and other Asian scops owls. In 2008 photographs and more sound recordings were obtained by Bram Demeulemeester and Philippe Verbelen. Another sound recording was obtained in August 2011 by Jan van der Laan.

Detailed comparison of the Everett specimens and the later sound recordings with those of other scops owls found in Wallacea and the Indo-Malayan region indicated that the Lombok owls constituted a previously undescribed species and provided the basis for the 2013 description.

== Distribution and habitat ==
The Rinjani scops owl is restricted to the island of Lombok where it is the only resident scops owl species. It is locally common within remaining forest habitat on the island, much of which lies within the Gunung Rinjani National Park, at elevations of 25–1350 m.

== Threats ==
Prior to 2018, the Rinjani scops owl was not included on Indonesia's protected species list; however, given that there was no harvest quota in place for the species, it could not be commercially traded. In 2018, the Government of Indonesia revised its list of protected species, which now does include the Rinjani scops owl as a protected species. However, open illegal trade in this species in the bird markets of Lombok has been recorded, and as such, illegal trade should be considered a potential threat to the conservation of this species.

== See also ==
- Bird species new to science described in the 2010s
