= 2021 songbird illness =

Bird disease outbreak in North America

The 2021 songbird illness was an unknown disease that caused the deaths of many songbirds in North America.
