= 2020 in birding and ornithology =

See also 2019 in birding and ornithology, main events of 2020 and 2021 in birding and ornithology

The year 2020 in birding and ornithology.

== Worldwide ==
=== New species ===
See also Bird species new to science described in the 2020s

== Africa ==
=== Guinea-Bissau ===
- Up to 1250 vultures were found dead by poisoning in Guinea-Bissau, with many beheaded, suggesting the body parts were harvested for ritual or medicinal purposes. Among the species killed were the critically endangered hooded vulture (Necrosyrtes monachus).

== Asia ==
=== India ===
- The critically endangered great Indian bustard (Ardeotis nigriceps) has been added to Appendix 1 of the Convention on the Conservation of Migratory Species of Wild Animals. The formerly widespread and abundant bird has disappeared from 90% of its former range and the Ministry of Environment, Forest and Climate Change plans to declare all great Indian bustard habitats, conservation reserves and to bury power lines underground in those areas.

=== Myanmar ===
- The government quadrupled the Gulf of Mottama Ramsar site to 161,030 ha. The gulf has one of the largest congregations of shorebirds in Southeast Asia with over 90,000 overwintering, and surveys by BANCA (BirdLife in Myanmar) found the gulf to be the single most important site for the critically endangered, spoon-billed sandpiper (Calidris pygmaea).

== Europe ==
=== Britain ===
- Natural England granted licences to three falconers, to take up to six peregrine falcons (Falco peregrinus) from the nests of wild birds for falconry. Conditions include, nests must have at least three chicks and only the smallest chick can be removed. Chicks cannot be removed from upland areas where persecution of birds of prey is still a risk. Scottish Natural Heritage turned down a similar application.

==== Breeding birds ====
- The tern colony at Blakeney Point, Norfolk had its most successful breeding season in 25 years, attributed to the lack of visitors the area due to the coronavirus pandemic,
  - 2425 pairs of Sandwich terns (Thalasseus sandvicensis) fledged 1100 chicks, triple the number in 2019
  - 289 pairs of common tern (Sterna hirundo) fledged 170 chicks, the highest since 1999
  - more than 200 little tern (Sternula albifrons) chicks fledged, the most since 1994.
- Arctic tern (Sterna paradisaea) failed to breed at Long Nanny, Northumberland; their only breeding failure since they first nested here in 1980. Reasons for the failure include, exceptionally high tides in June which washed away some of the nests, predation by stoats and rats, and disturbance by people and a loose dog, leading to the remaining terns abandoning their nests. Six little tern fledged.
- 130 breeding pairs of roseate tern (Sterna dougallii) recorded at Coquet Island, Northumberland, its only UK colony.
- White Stork Project – 21 white stork (Ciconia ciconia) were released into the wild from Knepp Castle. Eight were fitted with GPS trackers and two were tracked flying over the Strait of Gibraltar to Morocco in October.

==== Rare birds ====
- In June and July, a bearded vulture (Gypaetus barbatus) was seen in the West Midlands and Peak District. Thought to be a juvenile from a reintroduction project in the Alps it has also been recorded from the Netherlands, Belgium, northern France and Alderney. It is only the second British record.

==== Other events ====
- The 2020 Birdfair at Rutland Water was cancelled due to the COVID-19 pandemic.

=== Ireland ===
- Numbers at the tern colony on Strangford Lough were lower than the previous year due to high tides and predators. The nests of sandwich tern were washed away on nearby Black Rock and Dunnyneill.
- 1898 pairs of roseate tern recorded.

== North America ==
- Black Birders Week (31 May to 5 June) was a series of online events to increase the visibility of Black birders and Black nature enthusiasts in response to the Central Park birdwatching incident.
- Lights Out, Texas campaign (5 September to 29 October). Texans were asked to dim lights between 2300 hours and 0600 hours to protect night-flying migrants from veering off course and collisions.

== Oceania ==
=== Australia ===
- 2019–20 Australian bushfire season
  - It is estimated that at least 3 billion terrestrial vertebrates were killed or displaced by the fires including 180 million birds.

== South America ==
=== Argentina ===
- In Iberá National Park, a pair of red and green macaw (Ara chloropterus) produced three chicks; the first wild-born in Argentina for 150 years. Fifteen birds are now living free in the park.
