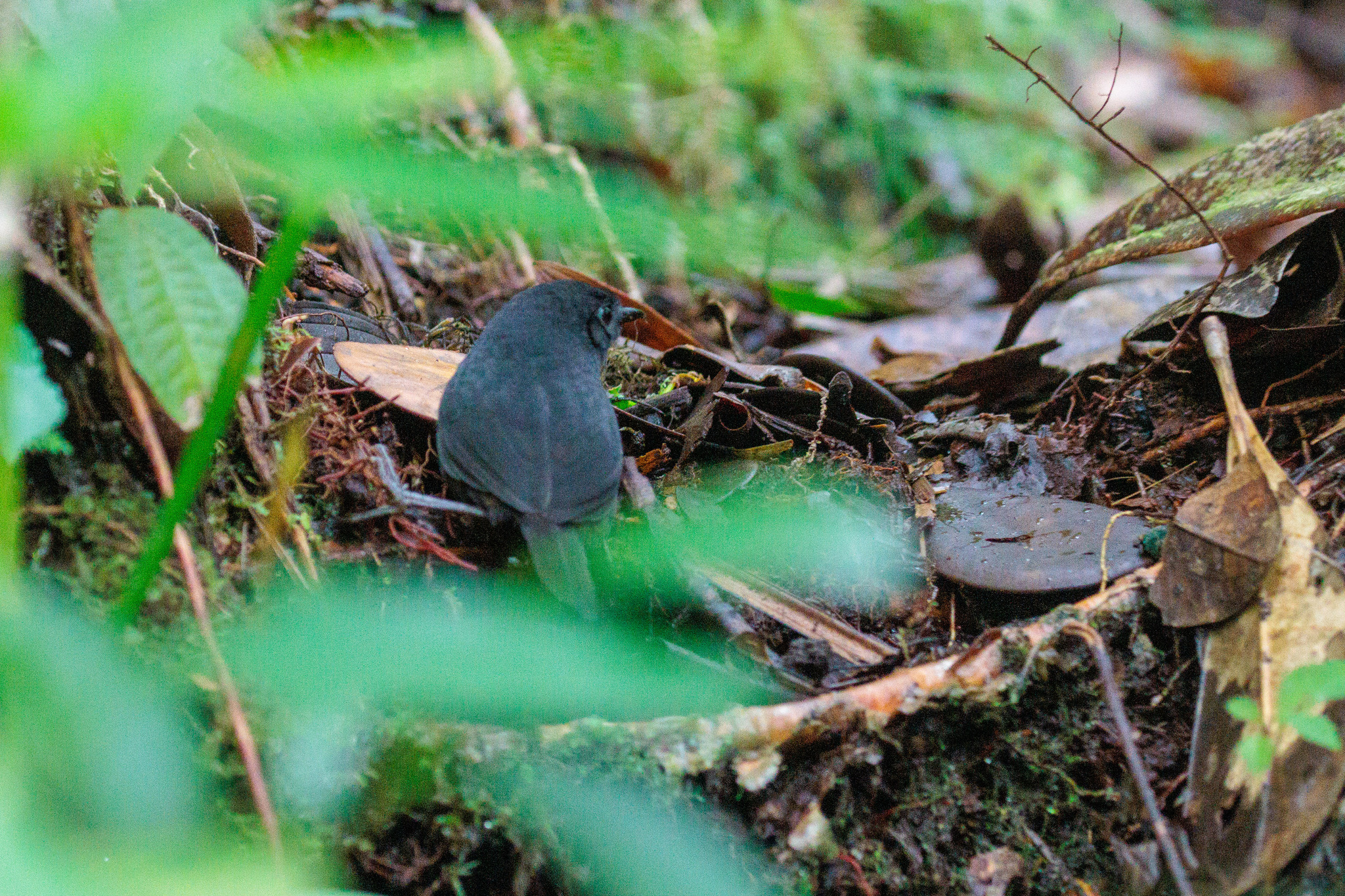

Conservation status
- Endangered (IUCN 3.1)

Scientific classification
- Kingdom: Animalia
- Phylum: Chordata
- Class: Aves
- Order: Passeriformes
- Family: Rhinocryptidae
- Genus: Scytalopus
- Species: S. gonzagai

Binomial name
- Scytalopus gonzagai Maurício, Belmonte-Lopes, Pacheco, Silveira, Whitney & Bornschein, 2014

= Boa Nova tapaculo =

Species of bird in Brazil

The Boa Nova tapaculo (Scytalopus gonzagai), also known as the Bahian mouse-colored tapaculo, is a species of passerine bird native to Bahia, Brazil.

== Taxonomy ==
The Boa Nova tapaculo was first observed in the early 1990s, when it was misidentified as part of the Scytalopus speluncae species, or the mouse-coloured tapaculos. A neighboring yet geographically isolated population was found in 1999. In 2014, researchers from the Universidade Federal de Pelotas recognized Scytalopus gonzagai as a unique species.

The specific epithet was chosen to honour Luiz Antonio Pedreira Gonzaga, a Brazilian ornithologist who discovered two bird species in Bahia in the 1990s. Locals call it the "Macuquinho-preto-baiano".

== Description ==
Covered in grey plumage and with yellow to brown claws, the species measures 12 centimetres (4.7 in) long and weighs 15 grams (0.53 oz).

== Range and habitat ==
The species' range is limited to five patches of forest in mountainous parts of the Atlantic Forest in southern Bahia, Brazil, having been found in the municipalities of Arataca, Boa Nova, and Iguaí. This is an area covering about 5,885 hectares. S. gonzagai is usually found under dense vegetation or in branches no higher than 2 metres (6.6 ft) off the ground.

== Behavior ==
Males are territorial, being found either on their own or as part of a pair with a female. Females are typically only found paired with a male. The species has been observed to have three different kinds of call - a "kreew" sound, which probably serves as a sort of contact call, an alarm call, and the song. Only females sing. Distribution is usually about 0.49 individuals per hectare.

== Conservation status ==
The Boa Nova tapaculo is estimated to consist of no more than 2,883 individuals, and is threatened by logging and deforestation, resulting in the scientists who described it urging that it be classified as an endangered species on the IUCN Red List.
