= Iguaí =

Municipality of Bahia, Brazil

- Municipality
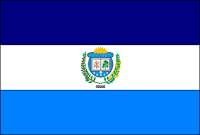
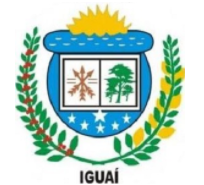
- Flag Coat of arms

- Coordinates: 14°45′S 40°04′W
- Country: Brazil
- Region: Nordeste
- State: Bahia

Population (2020)
  - Total: 26,963
- Time zone: UTC−3 (BRT)

Iguaí is a municipality in the state of Bahia in the North-East region of Brazil.

== See also ==
- List of municipalities in Bahia
