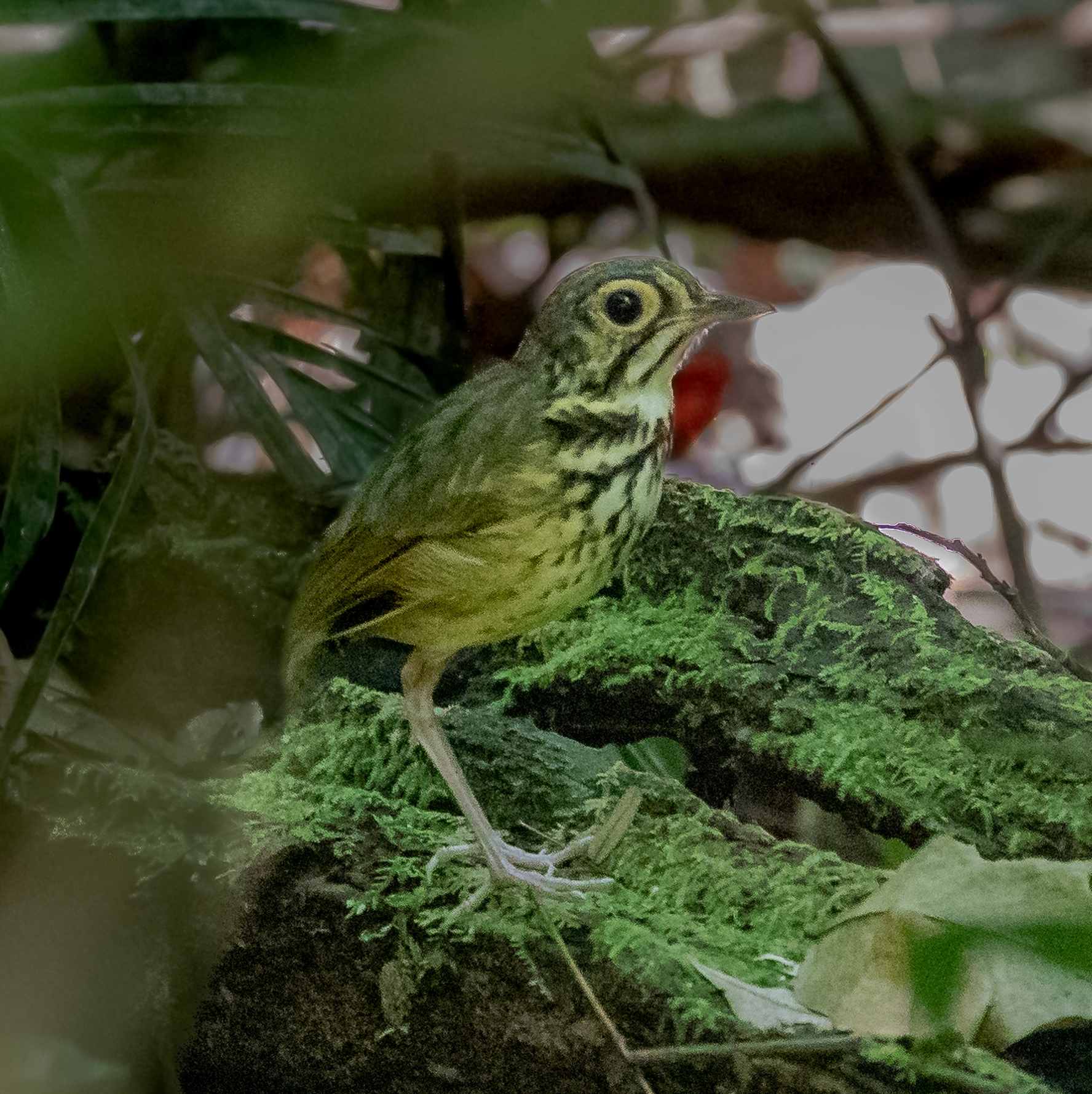

Scientific classification
- Kingdom: Animalia
- Phylum: Chordata
- Class: Aves
- Order: Passeriformes
- Family: Grallariidae
- Genus: Hylopezus
- Species: H. paraensis

Binomial name
- Hylopezus paraensis (Snethlage, 1910)

Synonyms
- Grallaria macularia berlepschi; Grallaria macularia paraensis

= Snethlage's antpitta =

Species of bird in Brazil

Snethlage's antpitta (Hylopezus paraensis) is a species of bird in the family Grallariidae. It is endemic to Brazil.

== Taxonomy and systematics ==
In 1907 Emilie Snethlage originally described what is now Snethlage's antpitta as the subspecies Grallaria macularia berlepschi of the spotted antpitta. In 1910 she was notified that berlepschi had already been applied to another species, what is now the Amazonian antpitta (then Grallaria berlepschi, now Myrmothera berlepschi). She requested that the name be changed to G. m. paraensis. Early in the twentieth century the spotted antpitta was transferred to genus Hylopezus. Following a 2012 publication, the International Ornithological Committee, the Clements taxonomy, and the South American Classification Committee of the American Ornithological Society elevated the subspecies paraensis to species status and gave it its English name. However, as of early 2024 BirdLife International's Handbook of the Birds of the World (HBW) has retained H. paraensis as a subspecies of the spotted antpitta.

Snethlage's antpitta is monotypic.

== Description ==
Snethlage's antpitta is 13 to 14 cm (5.1 to 5.5 in) long and weighs about 42 to 48 g (1.5 to 1.7 oz). The sexes have the same plumage. Adults have a buffy-white loral spot and a buff-ochraceous ring around the eye. Their ear coverts are olive-brown with faint streaks and mottling and a black streak below them. Their forehead, crown, and nape are gray with an olive wash. Their upperparts are olive-gray that becomes olive-brown by the rump and tail. Their wings are mostly olive-brown with tawny bases to some flight feathers, blackish primary wing coverts, and large tawny-buff spots near the ends of the median and lesser wing coverts. They have a white "moustache" with a black stripe below it. Their throat is white with a black line down from the bill. Their underparts are mostly white with a buff or ochraceous yellow wash across their breast and a slight olive wash on their sides and flanks. Their breast has short black streaks and their flanks small black spots. They have a dark brown iris, a dark gray to blackish maxilla, a pale gray to pinkish mandible with a blackish tip, and dusky pink to pinkish brown legs and feet.

== Distribution and habitat ==
Snethlage's antpitta is found in northeastern Brazil south of the Amazon from the Xingu River east to the Atlantic. Almost its entire range is in Pará state but it extends slightly into Maranhão state. The species inhabits the undergrowth of mature terra firme forest. It is a bird of the lowlands, reaching only from sea level to about 500 m (1,600 ft).

== Behavior ==
=== Movement ===
Snethlage's antpitta is believed to be resident throughout its range.

=== Feeding ===
The diet and foraging behavior of Snethlage's antpitta are not known. They are assumed to be similar to those of its former "parent" spotted antpitta, which see here.

=== Breeding ===
Nothing is known about the breeding biology of Snethlage's antpitta.

=== Vocalization ===
The song of Snethlage's antpitta is described as "a decelerating series of 5–6 similar notes lasting about 3s, delivered at c.0.8 kHz, sometimes falling slightly in pitch" and is "usually repeated at intervals of 10–20s".

== Status ==
The IUCN follows HBW taxonomy so it has not assessed Snethlage's antpitta separately from the spotted antpitta. "As the most range-restricted of the newly recognised species within the Spotted Antpitta complex, however, it certainly merits a re-evaluation of its conservation status." It occurs in at least three protected areas.
