= 2017 in birding and ornithology =

See also 2016 in birding and ornithology, main events of 2017 and 2018 in birding and ornithology

The year 2017 in birding and ornithology.

== Worldwide ==
=== New species ===
See also Bird species new to science described in the 2010s

=== Taxonomic developments ===
The British Ornithologists' Union announced that it would adopt the IOC World Bird List from 1 January 2018.

=== Ornithologists ===
==== Deaths ====
- James Ferguson-Lees (born 1929)

== Europe ==
=== Britain ===
==== Breeding birds ====
- Night heron (Nycticorax nycticorax) recorded successfully breeding for the first time in Britain. Two birds fledged at the Westhay Moor National Nature Reserve, managed by the Somerset Wildlife Trust.
- A number of hen harriers (Circus cyaneus) disappeared in suspicious circumstances over land managed for grouse shooting. There were only three successful nests in England.

==== Other events ====
- According to the Royal Society for the Protection of Birds' Birdcrime report, there were 68 confirmed incidents of raptor persecution in the UK, with shooting the most common method. There was four prosecutions and one conviction.

== North America ==
To be completed
