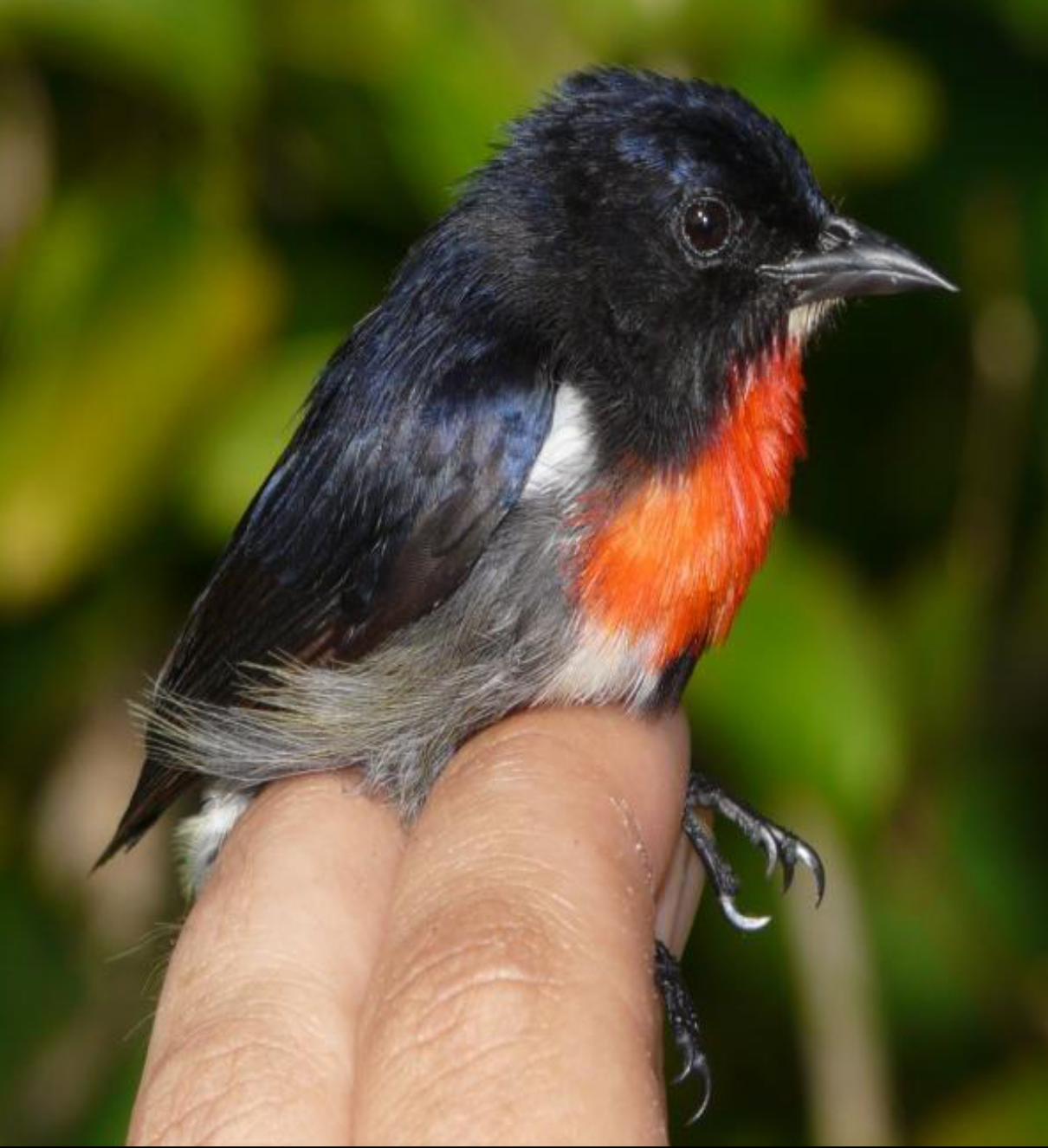

Scientific classification
- Kingdom: Animalia
- Phylum: Chordata
- Class: Aves
- Order: Passeriformes
- Family: Dicaeidae
- Genus: Dicaeum
- Species: D. celebicum
- Subspecies: D. c. kuehni

Trinomial name
- Dicaeum celebicum kuehni Hartert, 1903

= Wakatobi flowerpecker =

Subspecies of bird

The Wakatobi flowerpecker (Dicaeum celebicum kuehni) is a subspecies of the grey-sided flowerpecker that is endemic to the Wakatobi Islands of Indonesia. Some authorities consider it to be a separate species as Dicaeum kuehni.

== Taxonomy and systematics ==
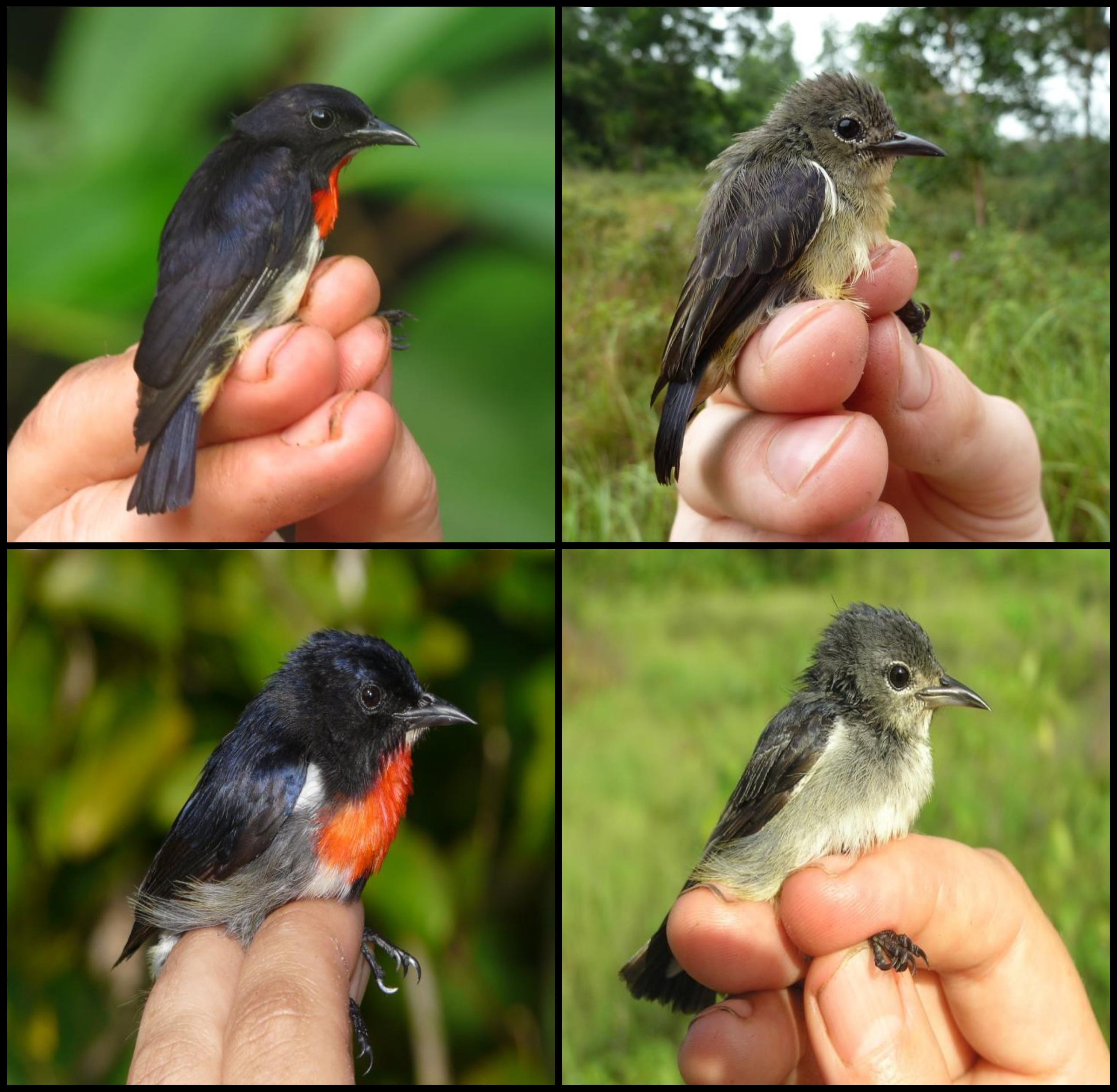
A comparison of plumage characteristics of male (left column) and female (right column) flowerpeckers. Grey-sided flowerpeckers (Dicaeum celebicum) from mainland Sulawesi are on the top, and Wakatobi flowerpeckers (D. kuehni) from the archipelago are on the bottom.

The Wakatobi flowerpecker was originally described as a species of flowerpecker in 1903 by Ernst Hartert and was reclassified as a subspecies of the grey-sided flowerpecker shortly thereafter. The specific name commemorates Heinrich Kühn, a German bird collector who worked for Ernst Hartert in Indonesia.

New analysis published in 2014 by Seán Kelly et al. proposed re-establishing the Wakatobi flowerpecker as a distinct species, based on DNA and morphological comparisons. Using a combination of genetic, phylogenetic, and phenotypic analyses, the team determined the Wakatobi flowerpecker was a distinct species from the Grey-sided flowerpecker. Additionally, genetic evidence showed that the two species come from distinct genetic lines that have not interbred. This suggests that neither species can traverse the 27 kilometres (17 mi) between the Wakatobi islands and Sulawesi mainland.

== Description ==
Wakatobi flowerpeckers exhibit sexual dimorphism. Males have dark gray feathers on the back and tail, white feathers on the belly, and red feathers on the chin. Females have medium gray feathers on the back and tail and light gray to white feathers on the belly and chin. Compared to the closely related grey-sided flowerpecker, the Wakatobi flowerpecker is significantly larger: it has longer wings, a longer bill, a longer skull, and is heavier. Additionally, there are subtle color variations: compared to the grey-sided flowerpecker, male Wakatobi flowerpeckers have bluer upper feathers, lighter side feathers, and their red coloring extends further down. For females there are no major color differences between the two species. The species feeds primarily on fruit.

== Distribution and habitat ==
The Wakatobi flowerpecker is endemic to the Wakatobi Islands, off the SE peninsula of Sulawesi. Although the area lies within the Wakatobi National Park, there is currently no environmental protection, and scientists have expressed concern over its prospects given the rate of human development in the region.
