= Guerrero brush finch =

Scientific classification
- Kingdom: Animalia
- Phylum: Chordata
- Class: Aves
- Order: Passeriformes
- Family: Passerellidae
- Genus: Arremon
- Species: A. kuehnerii

Binomial name
- Arremon kuehnerii Navarro-Sigüenza, García-Hernández, & Peterson, 2013

Species of bird

The Guerrero brush finch (Arremon kuehnerii) is a species of New World sparrow that is endemic to Mexico. The species was named in honor of Mr. Carl Kuehner, a member of the board of directors of the U.S. National Fish and Wildlife Foundation.

It is only known from the cloud forests of Sierra Madre del Sur of central Guerrero. It is phenotypically identical to the chesnut-capped brush finch (A. brunneinucha), which has a much wider range throughout the Americas and reaches its northern limit in central Mexico. However, genetic differences in mitochondrial DNA indicate a heavy divergence between A. kuehnerii and A. brunneinucha, and indicate that while both species look identical, the closest relative of A. kuehnerii is actually the green-striped brush finch (A. virenticeps), another Mexican endemic. The physical similarities between A. kuehnerii and A. brunneinucha despite the relation to A virenticeps are likely due to A. kuehnerii (but not A. virenticeps) retaining an ancestral phenotype similar to that of the A. brunneinucha species complex.

The Guerrero brushfinch is not included on the online list of world birds maintained by Frank Gill, Pamela Rasmussen and David Donsker on behalf of the International Ornithological Committee. Recognition of the species was considered but rejected by the American Ornithologists' Union.
