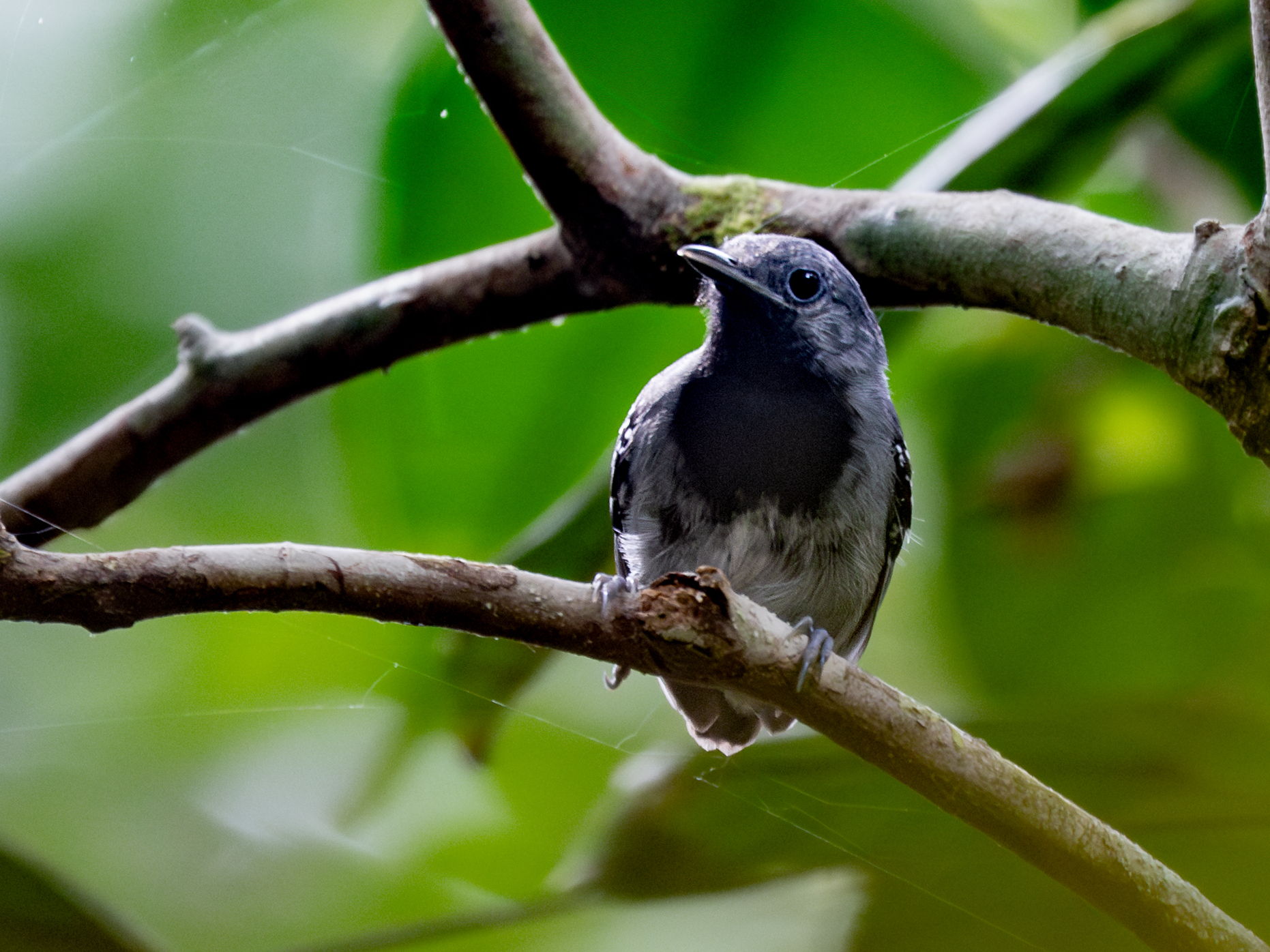

Conservation status
- Least Concern (IUCN 3.1)

Scientific classification
- Kingdom: Animalia
- Phylum: Chordata
- Class: Aves
- Order: Passeriformes
- Family: Thamnophilidae
- Genus: Myrmotherula
- Species: M. iheringi

Binomial name
- Myrmotherula iheringi Snethlage, 1914

= Ihering's antwren =

Species of bird

Ihering's antwren (Myrmotherula iheringi) is a species of bird in subfamily Thamnophilinae of family Thamnophilidae, the "typical antbirds". It is found in Bolivia, Brazil, and Peru.

== Taxonomy and systematics ==
Ihering's antwren has three subspecies, the nominate M. i. iheringi (Snethlage, 1914), M. i. heteroptera (Todd, 1927), and M. i. oreni (Miranda, Aleixo, Whitney, Silveira, Guilherme, MPD Santos & MPC Schneider, 2013). Subspecies M. i. oreni was initially described as a full species, and the same authors suggested that M. i. heteroptera also deserved to be treated as a species. At least one other author had earlier suggested that Ihering's antwren as then known included more than one species.

The species' English name and specific epithet honor Hermann von Ihering, a German ornithologist who worked mainly in Brazil.

== Description ==
Ihering's antwren is 8.5 to 9.5 cm (3.3 to 3.7 in) long and weighs 7.5 to 9 g (0.26 to 0.32 oz). It is a smallish bird with a shortish tail. Adult males of all three subspecies have dark gray upperparts with a hidden white patch between the shoulders. Their wings are dark gray with white-tipped black coverts. Their tail is dark gray. Their lower cheeks, throat, upper breast, and center of their lower breast are black. The rest of their underparts are a paler gray than the upperparts except for a whitish center to the belly. Adult females of the nominate subspecies have blue-gray upperparts. Their throat is whitish and their underparts pale buff. Subadult males resemble adult females with a blotchy black throat. Females of subspecies M. i. heteroptera have an ochraceous tinge to their upperparts and buff tips to their wing coverts. Females of subspecies M. i. oreni have a pale horn forehead, supercilium, and ring around the eye. Their upperparts are pure gray and the wing coverts' spots are white. The sides of their neck, throat, and belly are yellow-ochre.

== Distribution and habitat ==
Ihering's antwren is a bird of the western Amazon Basin south of the Amazon. The nominate subspecies is found in south-central Brazil from the drainages of the rios Jiparaná and Roosevelt east to the Rio Tapajós and south into Rondônia. Subspecies M. i. heteroptera is found in southwestern Brazil from the headwaters of the Rio Juruá east to the Rio Madeira. Subspecies M. i. oreni is found in east-central and southeastern Peru, extreme northwestern Bolivia, and far western Brazil's Acre state.

Ihering's antwren inhabits the understorey to mid-storey of evergreen forest in the lowlands, of both terra firme and transitional forest types. Subspecies M. i. oreni is very strongly associated with, and possibly restricted to, stands of Guadua bamboo. The other two subspecies favor areas with heavy vine tangles with or without bamboo. In elevation the species occurs below about 400 m (1,300 ft).

== Behavior ==
=== Movement ===
Ihering's antwren is believed to be a year-round resident throughout its range.

=== Feeding ===
The diet of Ihering's antwren is not known in detail but is probably mostly insects and spiders. It forages singly, in pairs, or in family groups, and usually as part of a mixed-species feeding flock. It feeds mostly between about 3 and 10 m (10 and 30 ft) above the ground. It seeks prey by gleaning live leaves, and also takes prey from clusters of dead leaves, vine tangles, and along branches by gleaning, reaching, lunging, and with short sallies from a perch. Subspecies M. i. oreni apparently mostly takes prey from bamboo leaves and stems.

=== Breeding ===
The breeding season of Ihering's antwren is almost unknown. Observations in Peru hint that it spans at least July to November there. The species' nest has not been formally described but from photographs appears to be a deep cup. The clutch size is apparently two eggs; both parents incubate the clutch and provision the young. The incubation period and time to fledging are not known.

=== Vocalization ===
The songs of the three subspecies of Ihering's antwren differ somewhat, but are generally "a countable series of intense, downslurred 'peer' notes". The song of subspecies M. i. oreni is higher pitched than those of the other two subspecies. The subspecies' calls are apparently alike, "a disyllabic 'pe-weet', second syllable a sharp downslurred whistle".

== Status ==
The IUCN has assessed Ihering's antwren as being of Least Concern. It has a large range; its population size is not known and is believed to be decreasing. No immediate threats have been identified. It is considered "uncommon and somewhat local" and occurs in a few large protected areas. "More surveys are needed in order better to assess the species' distribution and population status in Brazil."
