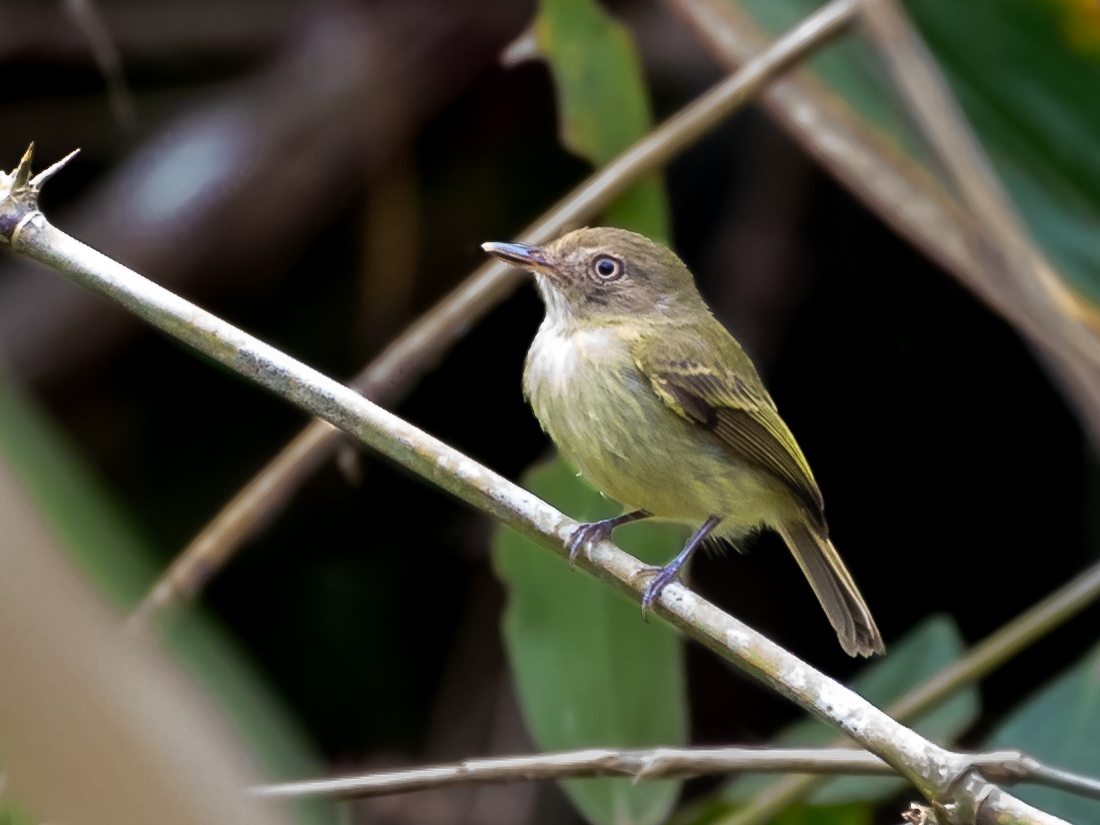

Conservation status
- Near Threatened (IUCN 3.1)

Scientific classification
- Kingdom: Animalia
- Phylum: Chordata
- Class: Aves
- Order: Passeriformes
- Family: Tyrannidae
- Genus: Hemitriccus
- Species: H. cohnhafti

Binomial name
- Hemitriccus cohnhafti Zimmer et al., 2013

= Acre tody-tyrant =

Species of bird

The Acre tody-tyrant (Hemitriccus cohnhafti) is a species of bird in the family Tyrannidae, the tyrant flycatchers. It is found in Bolivia, Brazil, and Peru.

== Taxonomy and systematics ==
The Acre tody-tyrant was first described in 2013 and taxonomic systems quickly began recognizing the new species. The describing authors chose the specific epithet cohnhafti to honor their colleague Mario Cohn-Haft "in recognition of his numerous and ongoing contributions to our understanding of the marvelous avifauna of Amazonian Brazil". The species' English name refers to the Brazilian state where it was discovered.

The Acre tody-tyrant is monotypic.

== Description ==
The Acre tody-tyrant is about 11 cm (4.3 in) long; one male weighed 9 g (0.32 oz). The sexes apparently have the same plumage. Adults have a greenish olive head and nape with darker streaks on the crown. They have tawny lores and a tawny wash on an otherwise greenish olive face. Their back and rump are greenish olive. Their wings are blackish with yellow outer edges and whitish inner edges on the flight feathers. Their wing coverts are black with yellowish tawny edges that show as two wing bars. Their tail feathers are blackish with dark green inner vanes. Their throat and breast are olive-green with creamy yellowish streaks, their upper belly and flanks are unstreaked olive-green, and their lower belly and undertail coverts are sulphur-yellow. They have a cream to brownish hazel iris and gray legs and feet. Their bill is flattish with a wide base and large oval nostrils; it is black with a creamy base to the mandible.

== Distribution and habitat ==
The Acre tody-tyrant was initially known only from the type locality in southeastern Acre in western Brazil. The locality is very close to both northwestern Bolivia and southeastern Peru and the original authors speculated that the species also occurred in those two countries. It has since been confirmed in both Bolivia and Peru.

The Acre tody-tyrant primarily inhabits secondary forest on nutrient-poor sandy soils. These areas typically have a canopy height of under about 12 m (40 ft) and occasionally as low as 5 m (15 ft). In Brazil at least they tend to have dead or dying stands of Guadua bamboo. It is not known to inhabit várzea or terra firme forest. In elevation it is known only below about 300 m (1,000 ft).

== Behavior ==
=== Movement ===
The Acre tody-tyrant is believed to be a year-round resident.

=== Feeding ===
The Acre tody-tyrant feeds on arthropods. It feeds mostly in thick undergrowth within about 1 to 4 m (3 to 13 ft) above the ground, using short upward sallies from a perch to glean prey from the underside of vegetation. It is not known to join mixed-species feeding flocks.

=== Breeding ===
Nothing is known about the Acre tody-tyrant's breeding biology.

=== Vocalization ===
The Acre tody-tyrant's song is a trill of "tick" notes similar to songs of other Hemitriccus tody-tyrants though shorter and lower pitched. The trill usually does not have introductory notes. It also makes "single-note skep or keek calls...or lower frequency kup calls" and sometimes combines them.

== Status ==
The IUCN has assessed the Acre tody-tyrant as Near Threatened. Its population size is not known "but given the paucity of records and small range it is unlikely to be very large", and it is believed to be decreasing though at an unknown rate. "The species' tolerance of successional and shrubby habitats suggests that it may be able to cope with habitat degradation to some degree. There is however extensive clear-cutting ongoing in large parts of the range, particularly for the creation of cattle pastures."
