= São Miguel scops owl =

São Miguel scops owl Temporal range: Quaternary

Scientific classification
- Kingdom: Animalia
- Phylum: Chordata
- Class: Aves
- Order: Strigiformes
- Family: Strigidae
- Genus: Otus
- Species: O. frutuosoi

Binomial name
- Otus frutuosoi Rando, Alcover, Olson & Pieper, 2013

Extinct species of bird

The São Miguel scops owl (Otus frutuosoi) is a small extinct owl that once inhabited the island of São Miguel, in the Macaronesian archipelago of the Azores, in the North Atlantic Ocean. Its scientific specific name honours the 16th-century Azorean historian Gaspar Frutuoso.

== History ==
The owl was described from subfossil bones. It is the first extinct owl species to be described from the Azores and only the second (the first being the Madeiran scops owl) from Macaronesia. The describers suggest that the most likely cause of extinction was human settlement in the 15th century, with its associated habitat destruction and the introduction of alien species.

== Description ==
Compared with the Eurasian scops owl, the wings were smaller (two thirds the size of those of the Eurasian species), the legs longer (by 11.6%), and the pelvis both broader and shorter. It was also generally smaller than the Madeira Scops Owl. The proportions of its limbs and wing loading indicate that it lived mainly on the ground and had only a limited ability to fly. The distinctive anatomical features shown by this species has led scientists to conclude that it was an insectivore which probably lived on the forest floor of the laurisilva, where it would have hunted and sheltered.

== Taxonomy ==
A similar extinct species, the Madeiran scops owl Otus mauli, has deen described from two islands in the Madeira archipelago but the São Miguel scops owl differs from the Madieran species by the smaller size of many of its bones, especially the ulna and tibiotarsus.
