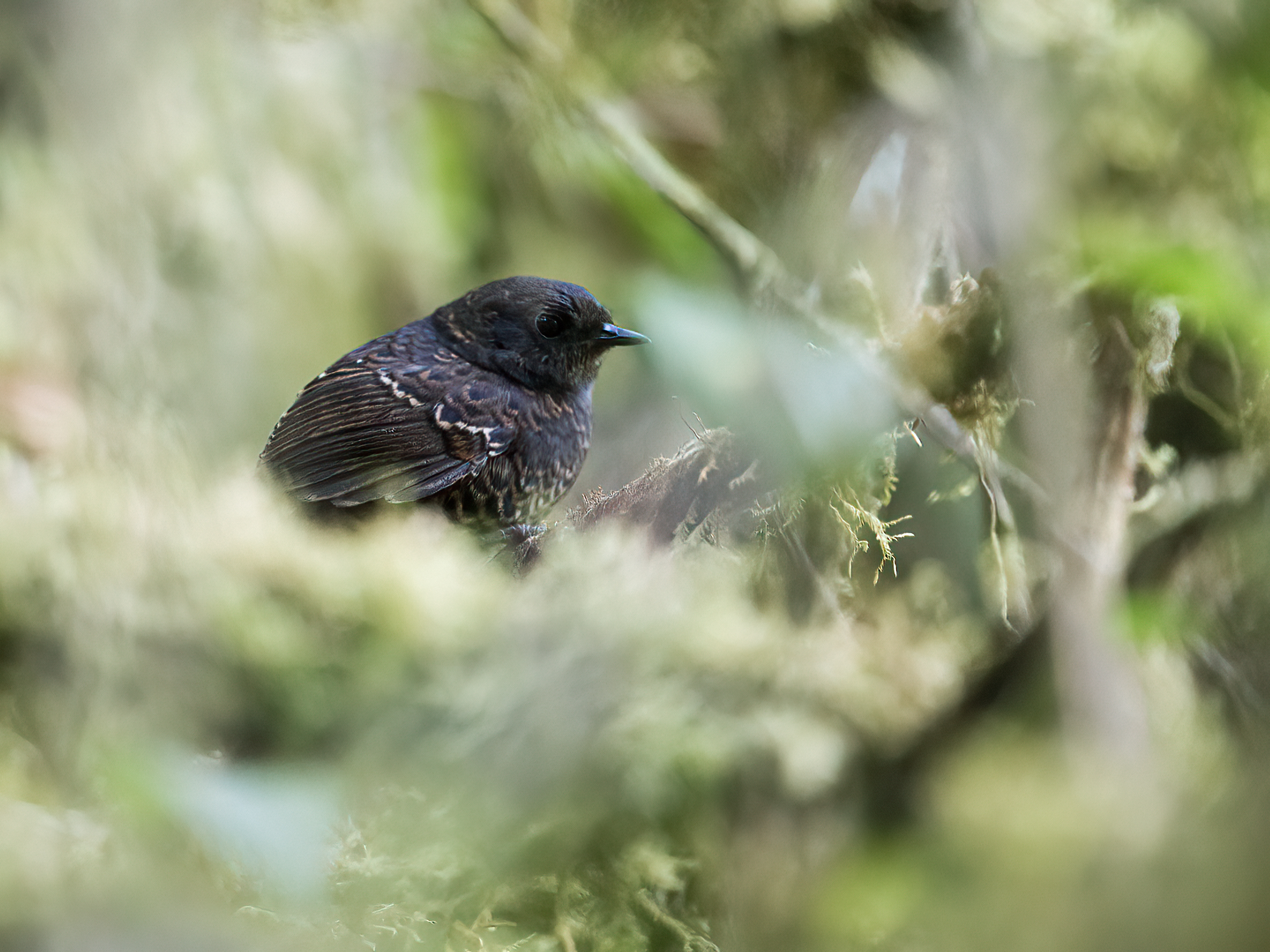

Conservation status
- Near Threatened (IUCN 3.1)

Scientific classification
- Kingdom: Animalia
- Phylum: Chordata
- Class: Aves
- Order: Passeriformes
- Family: Rhinocryptidae
- Genus: Scytalopus
- Species: S. gettyae

Binomial name
- Scytalopus gettyae Hosner et al., 2013

= Junin tapaculo =

Species of bird

The Junin tapaculo (Scytalopus gettyae) is a Scytalopus tapaculo from Peru. It was discovered in 2008 and described as new species in 2013. It differs from other Scytalopus species by its song which consisting of a rapidly repeated series of ascending phrases. The species' epithet commemorates Caroline Marie Getty, a granddaughter of J. Paul Getty and nature conservationist, who works for the National Fish and Wildlife Foundation (NFWF).

== Description ==
The measurements based on four specimens which include three adult males and one subadult male. All were collected in elevations between 2,300 m (7,500 ft) and 3,200 m (10,500 ft). The mass ranges between 19.8 and 20.9 g. The bill length is between 5.9 and 6.6 mm. The tarsus length is between 21.9 and 24.0 mm, the wing length is between 55.0 and 58.8 mm, and the tail length ranges from 37.0 to 40.9 mm.

== Conservation status ==
The Junin tapaculo is currently not listed in the IUCN Red List. It would qualify for an endangered species status if the current range, two localities 5 kilometres (3.1 mi) apart in a single drainage, will be confirmed. On the other hand, tapaculos have a secretive behaviour, and so it might be possible that it has a much wider range. Due to the lack of information Data deficient might be currently the most appropriate category.
