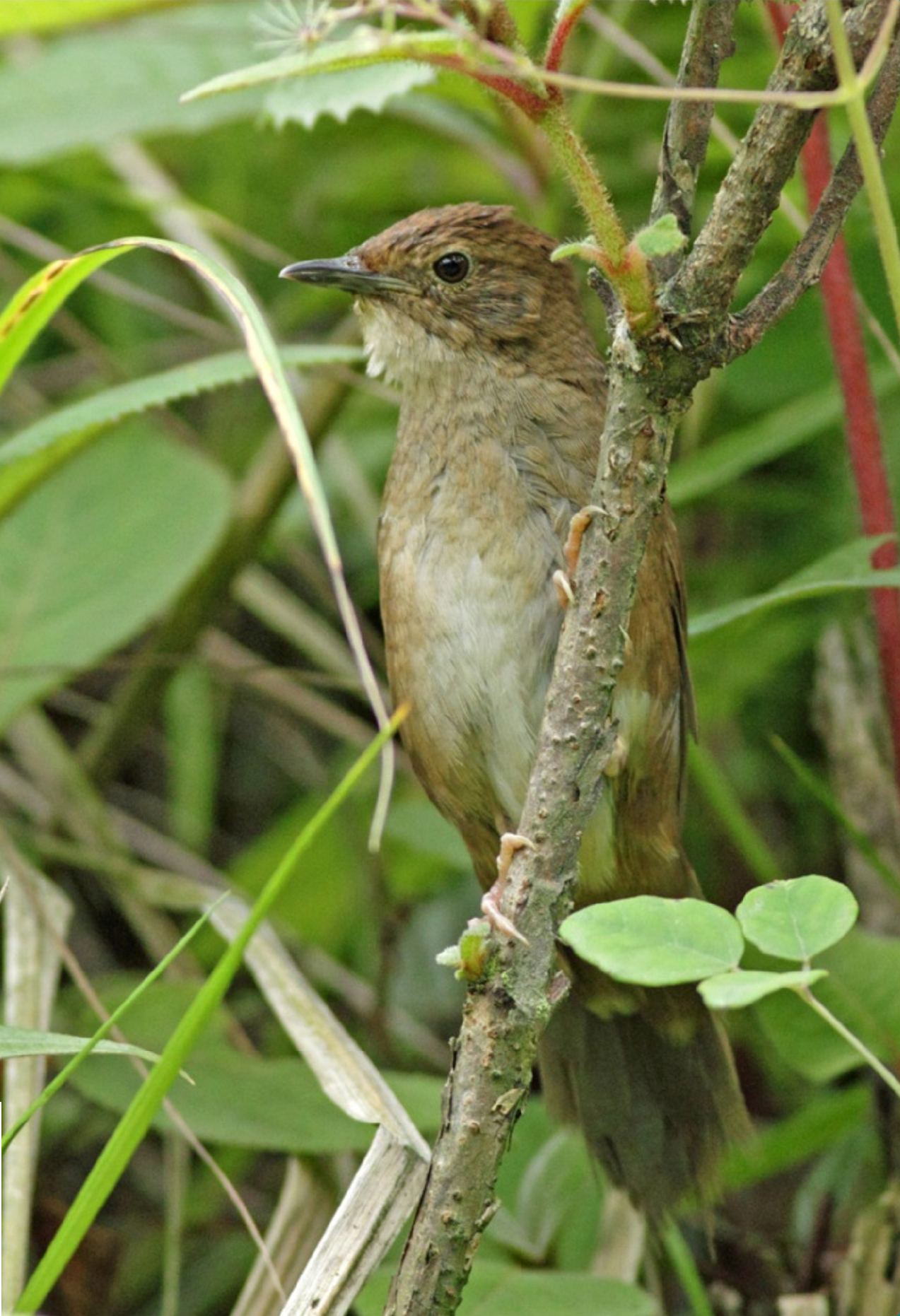

Conservation status
- Least Concern (IUCN 3.1)

Scientific classification
- Kingdom: Animalia
- Phylum: Chordata
- Class: Aves
- Order: Passeriformes
- Family: Locustellidae
- Genus: Locustella
- Species: L. chengi

Binomial name
- Locustella chengi Alström, Xia, Rasmussen, Olsson, Dai B, Zhao J, Leader, Carey, Dong L, Cai T, Holt, PI, Hung Le Manh, Song G, Liu Y, Zhang Y & Lei F, 2015
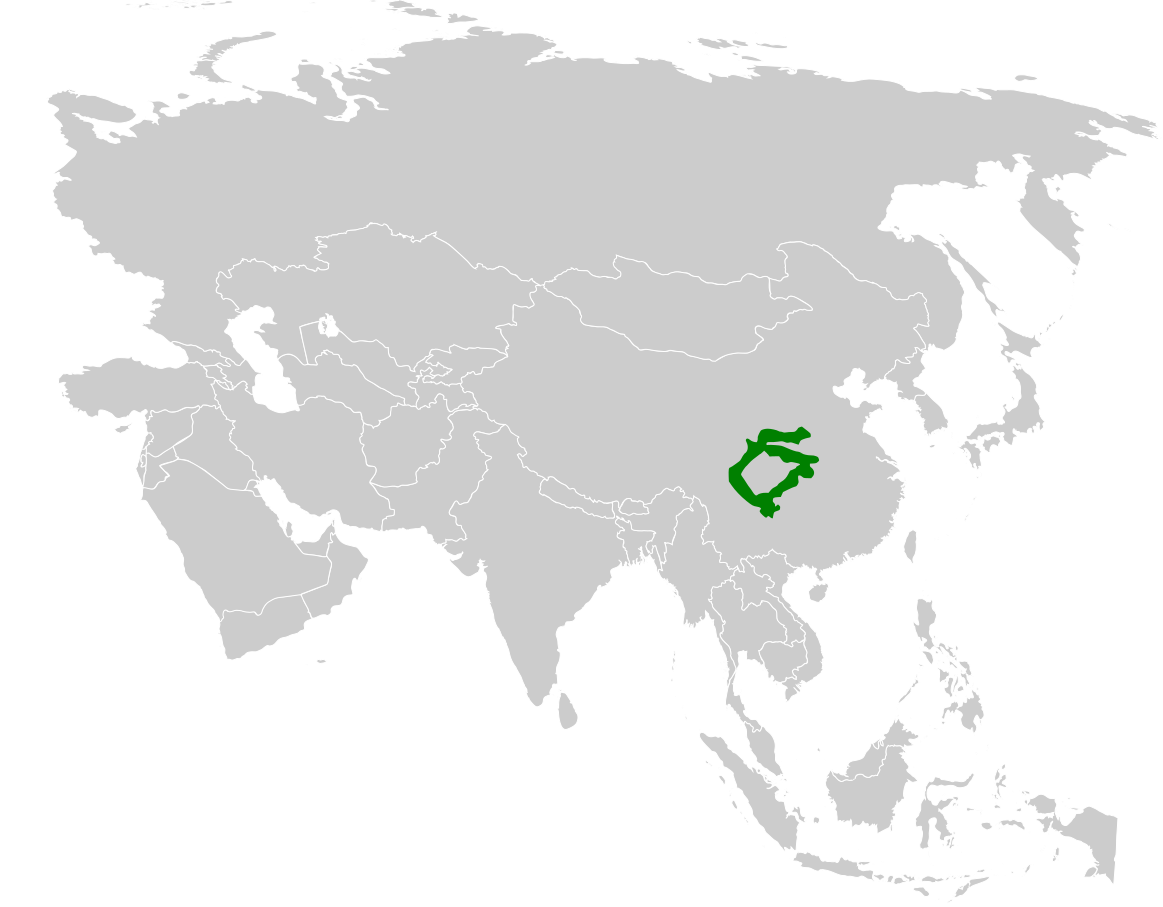

= Sichuan bush warbler =

Species of bird

The Sichuan bush warbler (Locustella chengi) lives primarily in the thick brush and on tea plantations in five mountainous provinces of central China. It is a relatively small bird with a weight of 10 grams and an average length of 13 cm. Unlike its congener the russet bush warbler, which is found in the same mountains and also in Himalayas, Vietnam, the Philippines, and Indonesia, the Sichuan bush warbler prefers elevations below 7,500 feet. The two species shared a common ancestor about 850,000 years ago. They are distinguished by plumage and sonogram terminology – their songs. Locustella chengi emits a long buzz, followed by a shorter click, often repeated in series, and the song is in a lower frequency than that of its genetic cousin.

The name honors Cheng Tso-hsin (Zheng Zuoxin, 郑作新) (1906–1998), founder of the Peking Natural History Museum and a prominent Chinese ornithologist.
