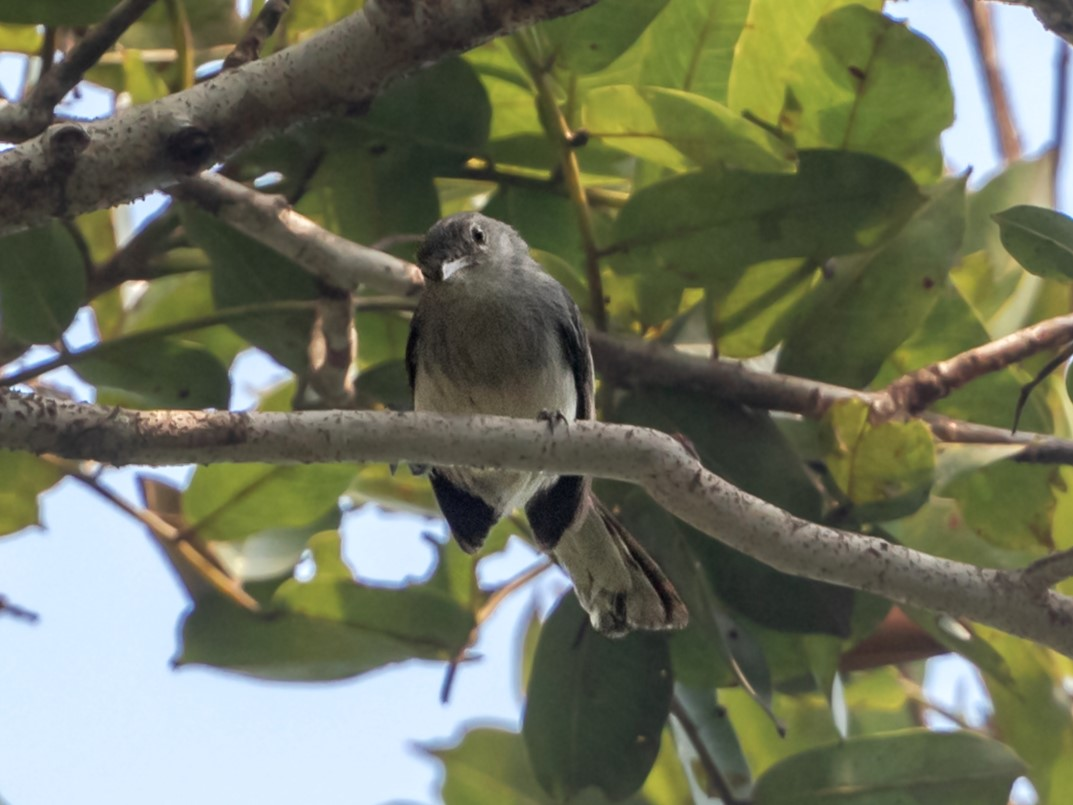

Scientific classification
- Kingdom: Animalia
- Phylum: Chordata
- Class: Aves
- Order: Passeriformes
- Family: Polioptilidae
- Genus: Polioptila
- Species: P. attenboroughi

Binomial name
- Polioptila attenboroughi Whittaker et al., 2013

= Inambari gnatcatcher =

Species of bird in Brazil

The Inambari gnatcatcher (Polioptila attenboroughi) is a species of bird in the family Polioptilidae. It is endemic to Brazil.

== Taxonomy and systematics ==
The Inambari gnatcatcher was described as a new species in 2013. The South American Classification Committee of the American Ornithological Society (SACC/AOS), the International Ornithological Committee (IOC), and the Clements taxonomy accepted it as a distinct species beginning in mid-2019. It had earlier been treated as a subspecies of the Guianan gnatcatcher (Polioptila guianensis), and BirdLife International (BLI) retains it there as of December 2020.

The Inambari gnatcatcher is monotypic.

== Description ==
The holotype Inambari gnatcatcher, an adult male, weighed 6 g (0.21 oz). Its head, nape, and neck are a uniform plumbeous gray. The throat, breast, upper belly, and flanks are also plumbeous gray, palest near the bill. The lower belly is white. It has a broken white eye ring. The innermost feathers of its tail are black and the outermost approximately 80% white, with those between intergrading.

== Distribution and habitat ==
The Inambari gnatcatcher's full range is not known. All of the few records are from the Brazilian central Amazon Basin south of the Rio Solimões (the Upper Amazon) and west of the Rio Madeira. The region is called the Inambari area of endemism. "So far as is known, Inambari Gnatcatcher inhabits the canopy of tall, humid, upland sandy-soil forest" at less than 500 m (1,600 ft) of elevation.

== Behavior ==
=== Feeding ===
The details of the Inambari gnatcatcher's diet is unknown but it is probably small invertebrates like that of other Polioptila gnatcatchers. It forages alone or in pairs and seems to always associate with mixed-species foraging flocks. It mostly gleans prey from foliage but also sallies out to catch flying insects.

=== Breeding ===
"The nest, eggs, and breeding biology of Inambari Gnatcatcher are completely unknown."

=== Vocalization ===
The Inambari gnatcatcher's loudsong is "an evenly paced series of six notes at a nearly level frequency" . It also has a more complex song.

== Status ==
The IUCN has not assessed the Inambari gnatcatcher. "The recent advancement of soybean plantations and general infrastructure along the BR-319 highway linking Manaus to Porto Velho in Brazil, which bisects the known range of Inambari Gnatcatcher, is a clear threat to this species."

== See also ==
- List of things named after David Attenborough and his works
