= List of threatened birds of Brazil =

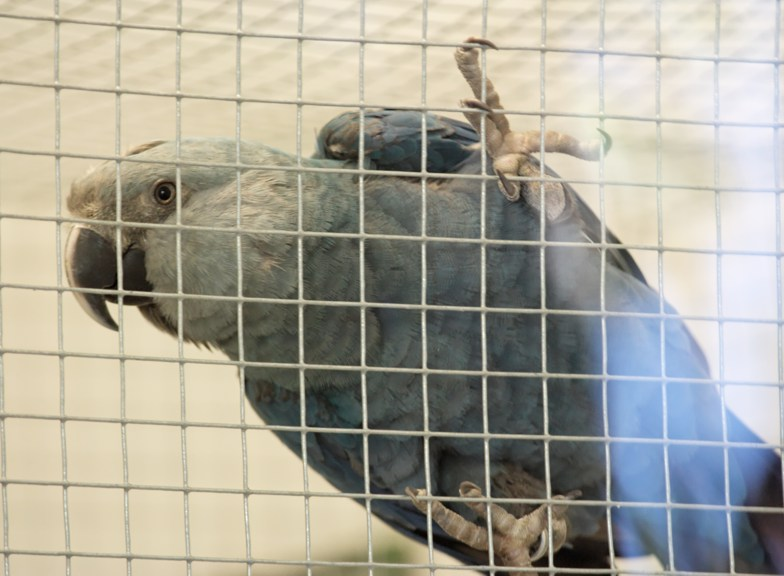
The Spix's macaw (Cyanopsitta spixii) is a critically endangered species and may be extinct in the wild.

Brazil has more than 1900 bird species, and according to the Chico Mendes Institute for Biodiversity Conservation and the Brazilian Ministry of the Environment, there are 240 species or subspecies of Brazilian birds listed as threatened, six as extinct and two as extinct in the wild. The Brazilian definition uses the same criteria and categories of IUCN. Among the 33 orders of birds in Brazil, 22 have threatened species. The passerine order (songbirds), besides being the most diverse order in Brazil, also has the most species on the Brazilian Red List, followed by parrots. The Northeast Region, notably the Atlantic forest and Caatinga, has the most endemic and threatened birds, and two of them, the Alagoas curassow and the Spix's macaw, are considered to be extinct in the wild. The Pernambuco Endemism Center presents many critically endangered species due to the intense destruction of the Atlantic forest. Some species might be extinct in Brazil, like the glaucous macaw and the Eskimo curlew.

A list of threatened species was published by Diário Oficial da União, on December 17, 2014. Even though some species have been removed from the list (for instance, the hyacinth macaw), the number of threatened species has increased in comparison with the former list (which had 160 taxa). Furthermore, the number of known species has been increasing considerably since the last half of the 20th century, and this has influenced the number of listed species.

In spite of using the same criteria, the ICMBio list often shows a different conservation status than the IUCN. That is because the assessments were done at different times by different researchers.

== Threatened birds of Brazil - ICMBio (2014) ==
=== Order Tinamiformes (tinamous) ===
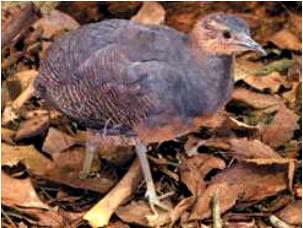
The yellow-legged tinamou (Crypturellus noctivagus noctivagus) is listed as a vulnerable species by ICMBio.

Family Tinamidae

- Crypturellus noctivagus noctivagus (yellow-legged tinamou) NT^{IUCN} - ICMBio status VU
- Crypturellus noctivagus zabele (yellow-legged tinamou) NE - ICMBio status VU
- Nothura minor (lesser nothura) VU^{IUCN} - ICMBio status EN
- Taoniscus nanus (dwarf tinamou) VU^{IUCN} - ICMBio status EN
- Tinamus tao (grey tinamou) VU^{IUCN} - ICMBio status VU

=== Order Anseriformes (ducks, geese, and swans) ===
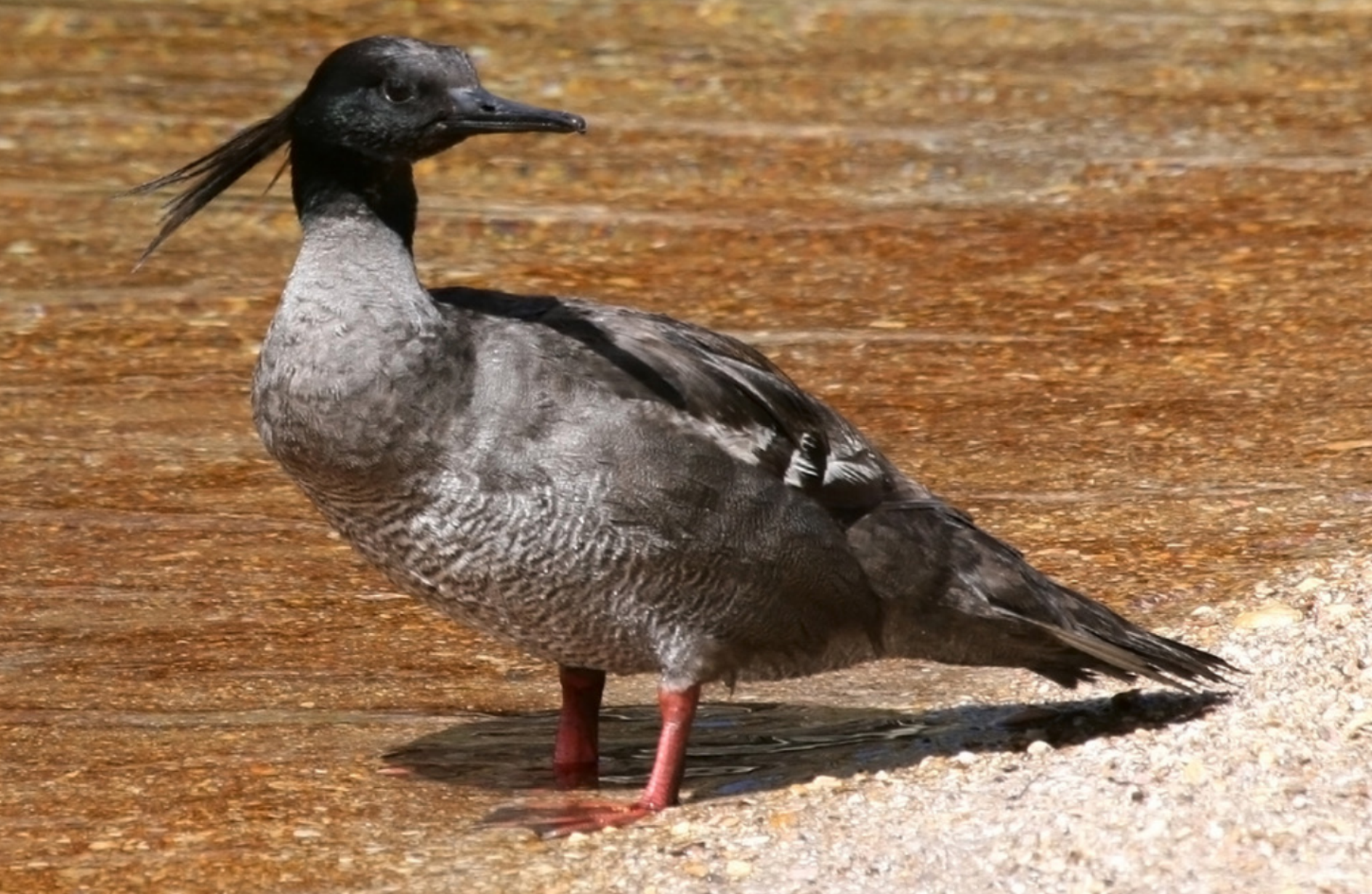
The Brazilian merganser (Mergus octosetaceus) is a critically endangered species.

Family Anatidae

- Mergus octosetaceus (Brazilian merganser) CR^{IUCN} - ICMBio status CR

=== Order Galliformes (gamebirds, landfowl, gallinaceous birds) ===
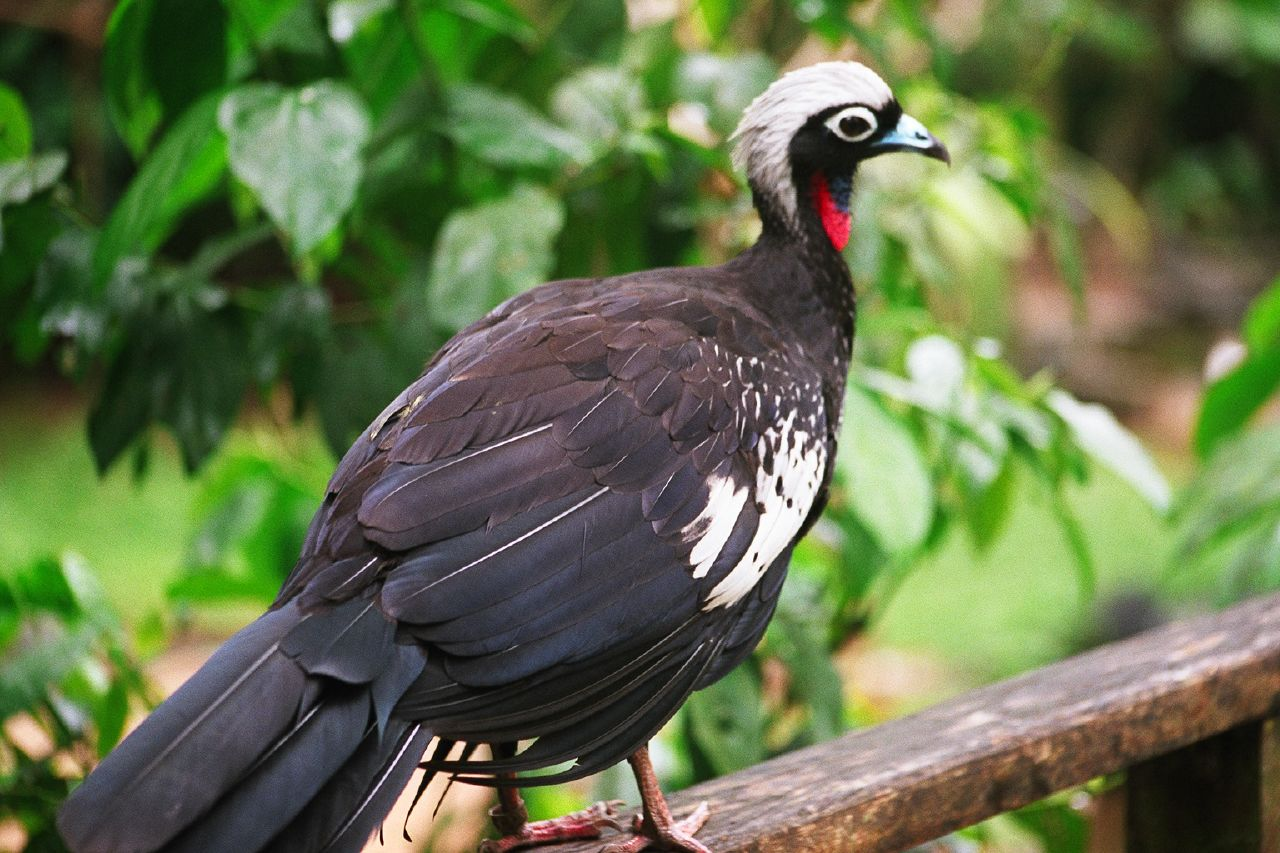
The black-fronted piping guan (Aburria jacutinga) is an endangered species of the Atlantic forest.

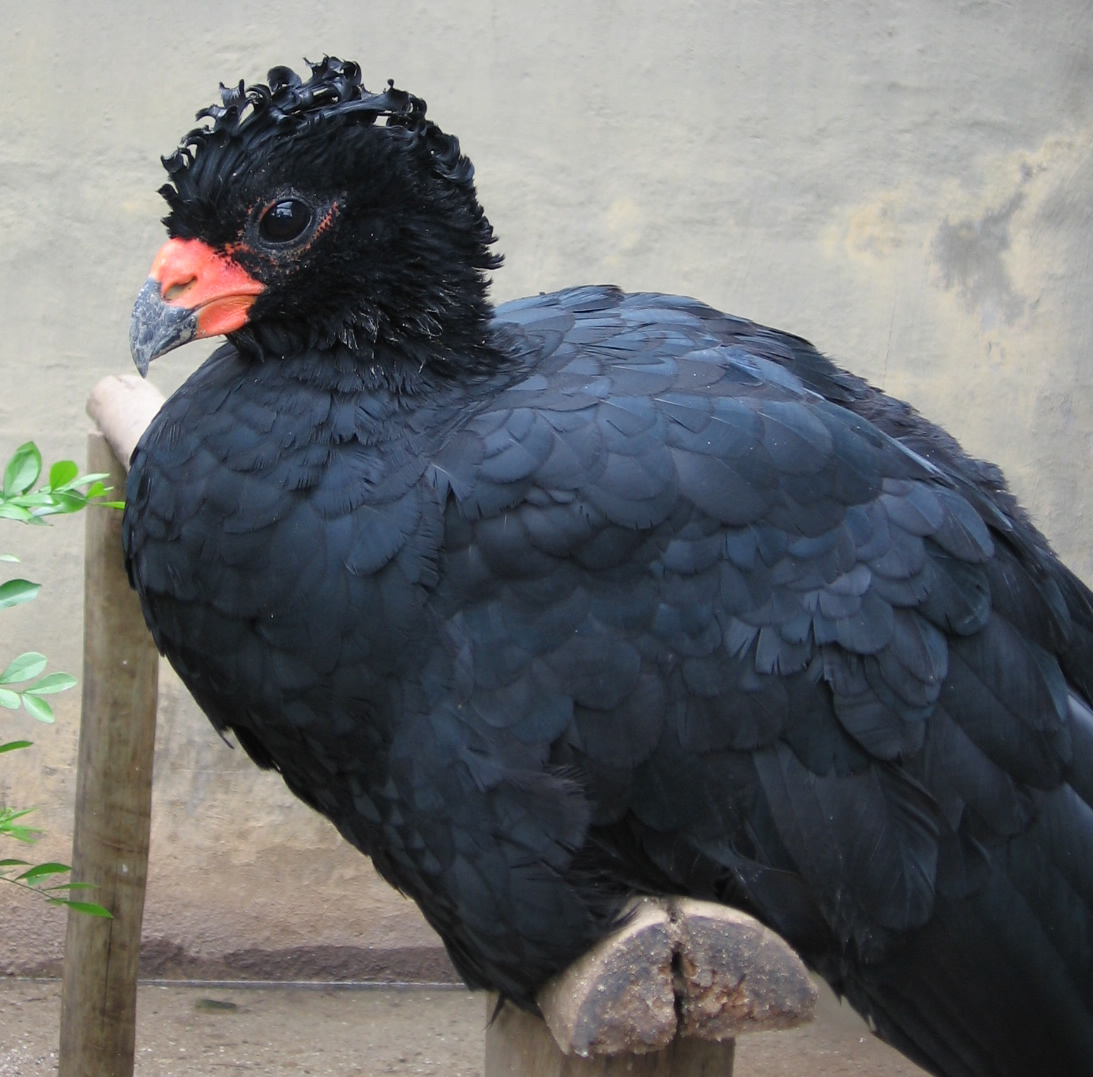
The red-billed curassow (Crax blumenbachii) is an endangered species of the Atlantic forest.

Family Cracidae (chachalacas, guans and curassows)

- Aburria jacutinga (black-fronted piping guan) EN^{IUCN} - ICMBio status EN
- Crax blumenbachii (red-billed curassow) EN^{IUCN} - ICMBio status CR
- Crax globulosa (wattled curassow) EN^{IUCN} - ICMBio status EN
- Crax fasciolata pinima (Natterer's curassow) CR^{IUCN} - ICMBio status CR
- Pauxi mitu (Alagoas curassow) EW^{IUCN} - ICMBio status EW
- Penelope jacucaca (white-browed guan) VU^{IUCN} - ICMBio status VU
- Penelope ochrogaster (chestnut-bellied guan) VU^{IUCN} - ICMBio status VU
- Penelope pileata (white-crested guan) VU^{IUCN} - ICMBio status VU
- Penelope superciliaris alagoensis (rusty-margined guan) NE - ICMBio status CR
- Ortalis guttata remota (speckled chachalaca) NE - ICMBio status CR

Family Odontophoridae (New World quails)

- Odontophorus capueira plumbeicollis (spot-winged wood quail) (NR) - ICMBio status CR

=== Ordem Procellariiformes (petrels) ===
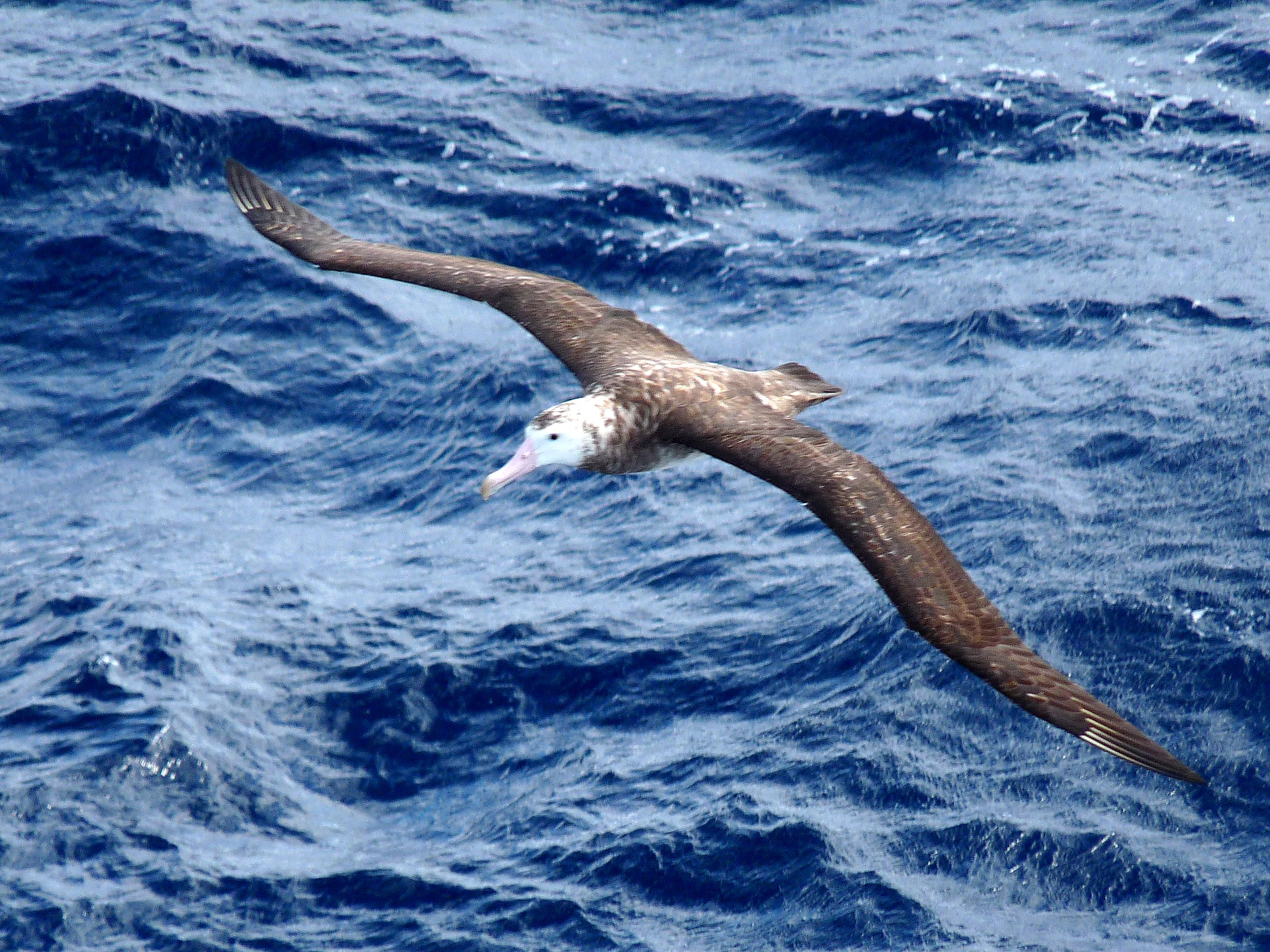
The Tristan albatross (Diomedea dabbenena) is a critically endangered species.

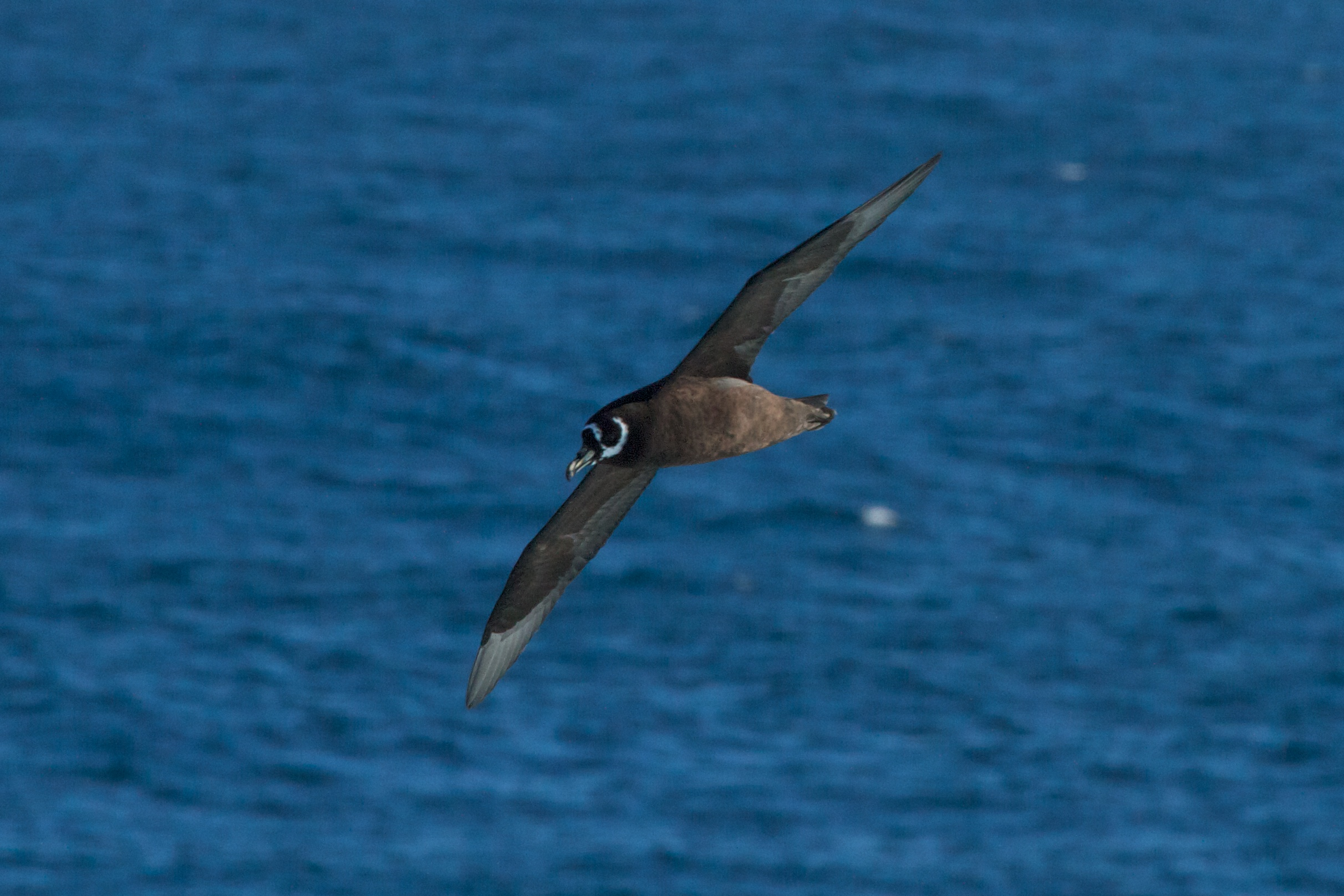
The spectacled petrel (Procellaria conspicillata) is a vulnerable species.

Family Diomedeidae (albatrosses)

- Diomedea dabbenena (Tristan albatross) CR^{IUCN} - ICMBio status CR
- Diomedea epomophora (southern royal albatross) VU^{IUCN} - ICMBio status VU
- Diomedea exulans (wandering albatross) VU^{IUCN} - ICMBio status CR
- Diomedea sanfordi (northern royal albatross) EN^{IUCN} - ICMBio status EN
- Thalassarche chlororhynchos (Atlantic yellow-nosed albatross) EN^{IUCN} - ICMBio status EN

Família Procellariidae (petrels)

- Procellaria aequinoctialis (white-chinned petrel) VU^{IUCN} - ICMBio status VU
- Procellaria conspicillata (spectacled petrel) VU^{IUCN} - Estado ICMBio VU
- Pterodroma arminjoniana (Trindade petrel) VU^{IUCN} - ICMBio status CR
- Pterodroma deserta (Desertas petrel) VU^{IUCN} - ICMBio status CR
- Pterodroma incerta (Atlantic petrel) EN^{IUCN} - ICMBio status EN
- Pterodroma madeira (Zino's petrel) EN^{IUCN} - ICMBio status EN
- Puffinus lherminieri (Audubon's shearwater) LC^{IUCN} - ICMBio status CR

=== Order Phaethontiformes (tropicbirds) ===
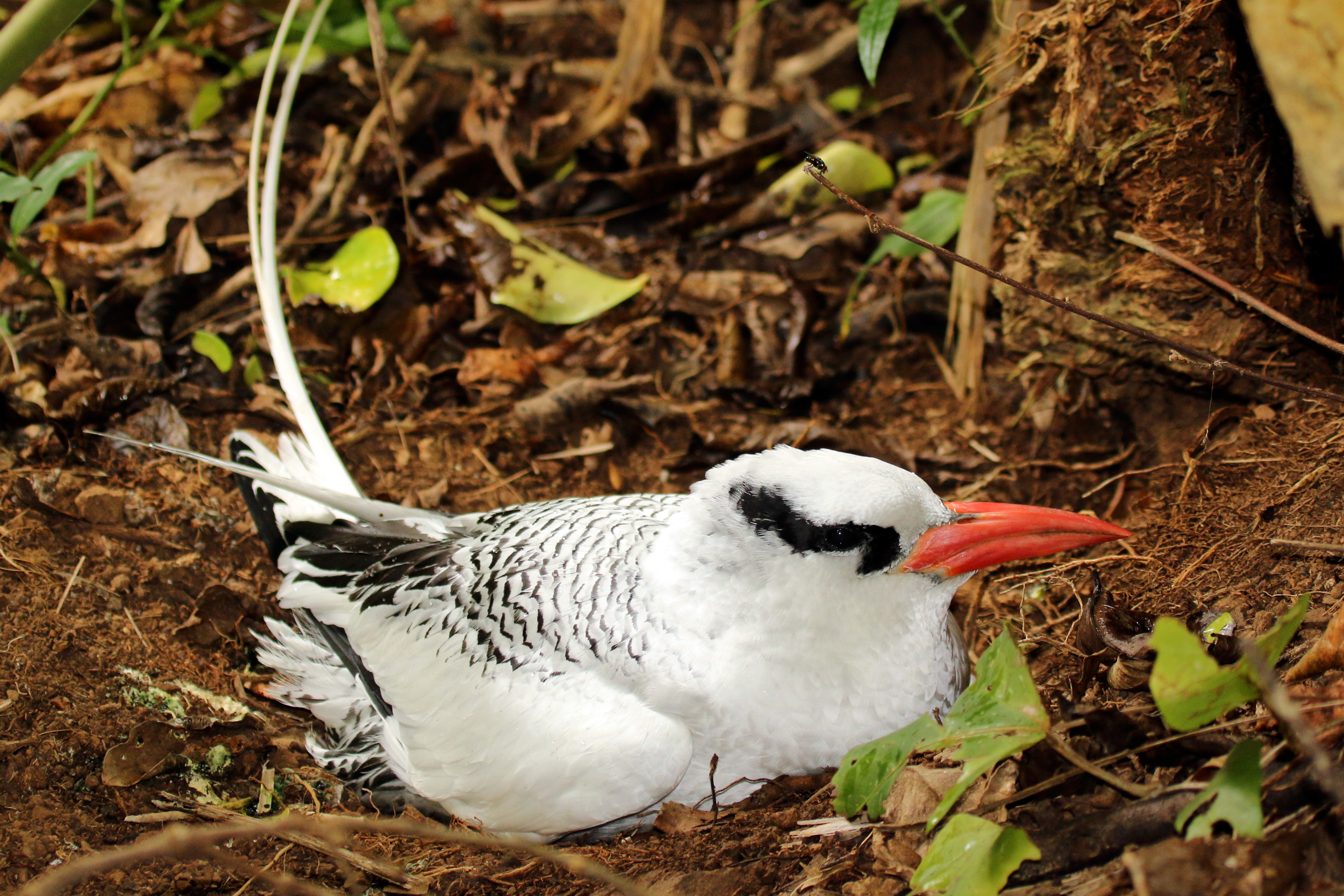
The red-billed tropicbird (Phaethon aethereus) is an endangered seabird in Brazil.

Family Phaethontidae

- Phaethon aethereus (red-billed tropicbird) LC^{IUCN} - ICMBio status EN
- Phaethon lepturus (white-tailed tropicbird) LC^{IUCN} - ICMBio status EN

=== Order Suliformes ===
Family Sulidae (boobies)

- Sula sula (red-footed booby) LC^{IUCN} - ICMBio status EN

=== Order Pelecaniformes ===
Family Ardeidae (herons)

- Tigrisoma fasciatum (fasciated tiger heron) LC^{IUCN} - ICMBio status VU

=== Ordem Accipitriformes (hawks, eagles and vultures) ===
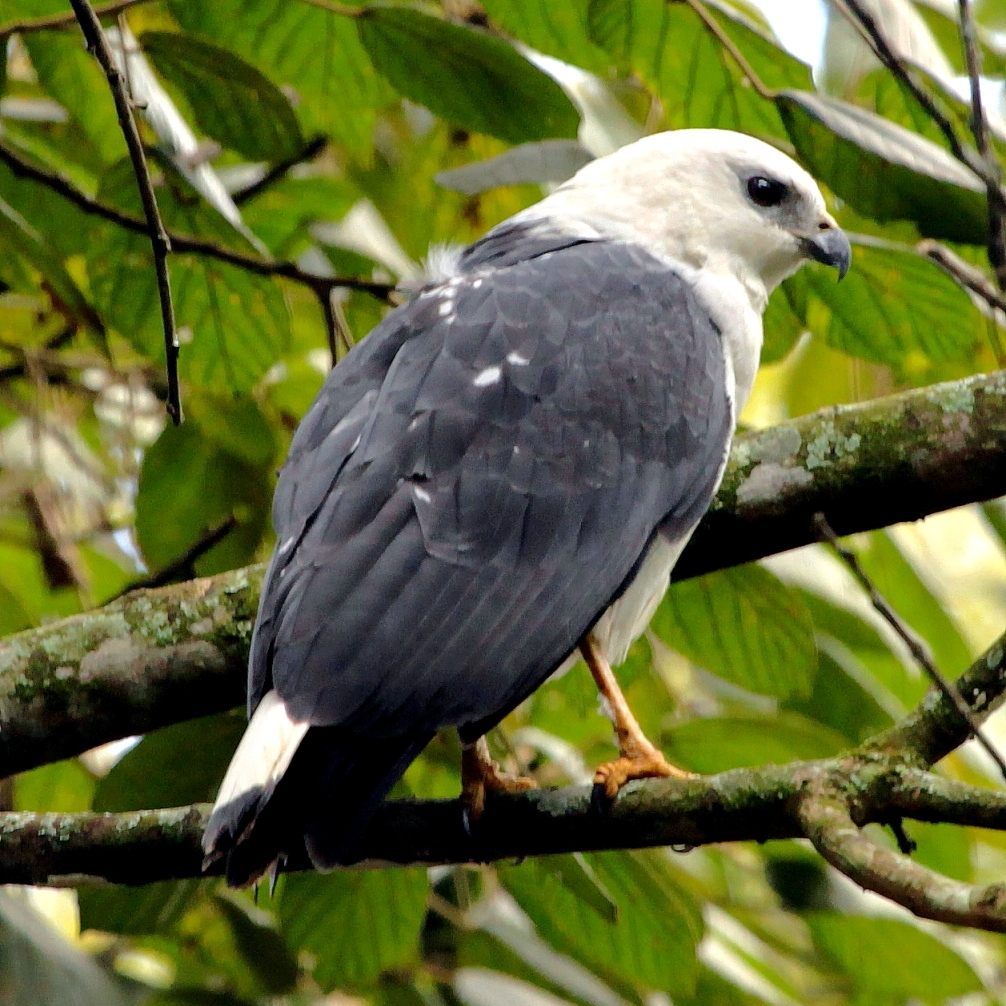
The white-necked hawk (Amadonastur lacernulatus) is a vulnerable species.

Family Accipitridae

- Amadonastur lacernulatus (white-necked hawk) VU^{IUCN} - ICMBio status VU
- Circus cinereus (cinereous harrier) LC^{IUCN} - ICMBio status VU
- Harpia harpyja (harpy eagle) NT^{IUCN} - ICMBio status VU
- Leptodon forbesi (white-collared kite) CR^{IUCN} - ICMBio status EN
- Morphnus guianensis (crested eagle) NT^{IUCN} - ICMBio status VU
- Urubutinga coronata (crowned solitary eagle) EN^{IUCN} - ICMBio status EN

=== Order Gruiformes (cranes) ===
Family Psophiidae (trumpeters)

- Psophia dextralis (dark-winged trumpeter) EN^{IUCN} - ICMBio status VU
- Psophia interjecta (dark-winged trumpeter) NE - ICMBio status VU
- Psophia obscura (dark-winged trumpeter) CR^{IUCN} - ICMBio status CR

Family Rallidae (rails)

- Porzana spiloptera (dot-winged crake) VU^{IUCN} - ICMBio status EN

=== Order Charadriiformes (waders, gulls and auks) ===
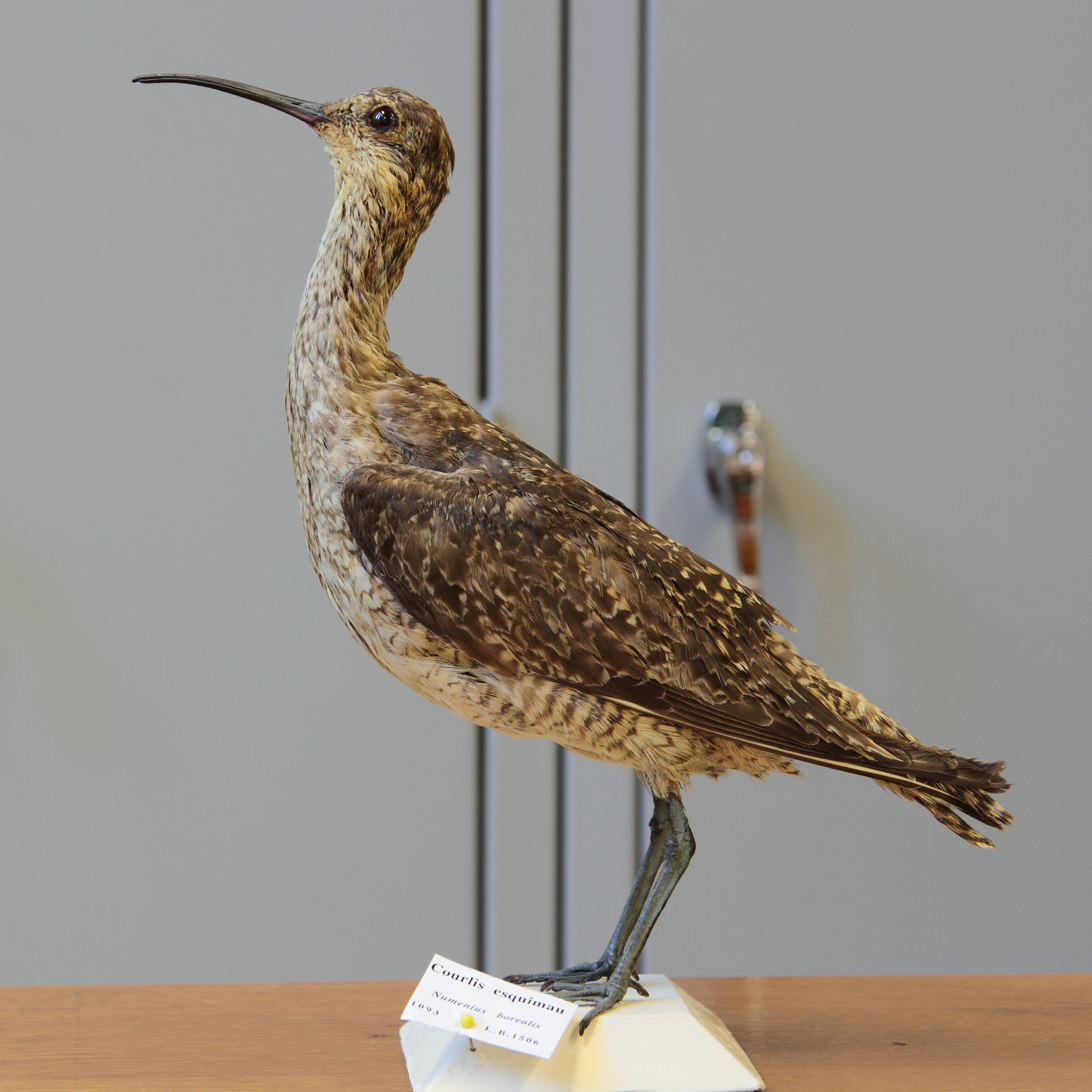
The Eskimo curlew (Numenius borealis) is possibly extinct.

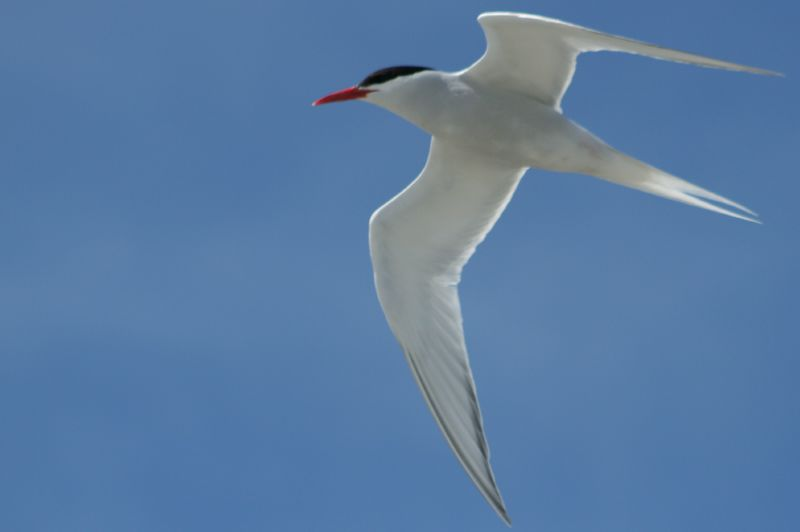
The South American tern (Sterna hirundinacea) is listed as vulnerable species by ICMBio.

Family Charadriidae (plovers, dotterels, and lapwings)

- Charadrius wilsonia (Wilson's plover) LC^{IUCN} - ICMBio status VU

Family Scolopacidae (sandpipers)

- Calidris canutus (red knot) NT^{IUCN} - ICMBio status EN
- Calidris pusilla (semipalmated sandpiper) NT^{IUCN} - ICMBio status EN
- Calidris subruficollis (buff-breasted sandpiper) NT^{IUCN} - ICMBio status VU
- Limnodromus griseus (short-billed dowitcher) LC^{IUCN} - ICMBio status CR
- Numenius borealis (Eskimo curlew) CR^{IUCN} - ICMBio status EX

Family Sternidae (terns)

- Sterna dougallii (roseate tern) LC^{IUCN} - ICMBio status VU
- Sterna hirundinacea (South American tern) LC^{IUCN} - ICMBio status VU
- Thalasseus maximus (royal tern) LC^{IUCN} - Estado ICMBio EN

=== Order Columbiformes (pigeons and doves) ===
Family Columbidae

- Claravis geoffroyi (purple-winged ground dove) CR^{IUCN} - ICMBio status CR(PEx)
- Columbina cyanopis (blue-eyed ground dove) CR^{IUCN} - ICMBio status CR(PEx)

=== Order Cuculiformes (cuckoos) ===
Family Cuculidae

- Neomorphus geoffroyi (rufous-vented ground cuckoo) VU^{IUCN} - ICMBio status VU
- Neomorphus geoffroyi amazonicus (rufous-vented ground cuckoo) NE - ICMBio status VU
- Neomorphus geoffroyi dulcis (rufous-vented ground cuckoo) NE - ICMBio status CR
- Neomorphus geoffroyi geoffroyi (rufous-vented ground cuckoo) NE - ICMBio status CR(PEx)
- Neomorphus squamiger (scaled ground cuckoo) VU^{IUCN} - Estado ICMBio VU

=== Ordem Strigiformes (owls) ===
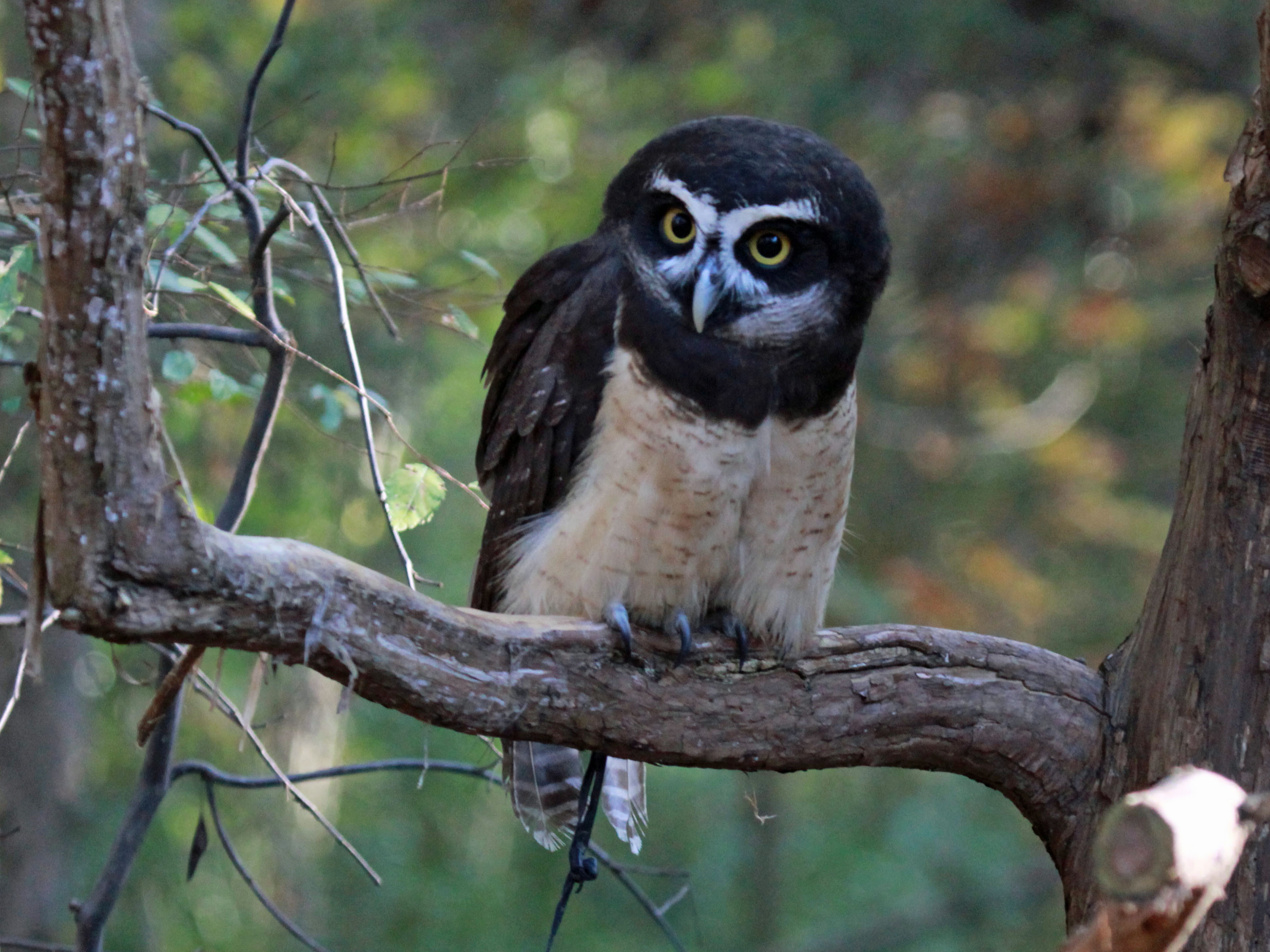
The spectacled owl (Pulsatrix perspicillata pulsatrix) is a vulnerable species.

Family Strigidae

- Glaucidium mooreorum (Pernambuco pygmy owl) CR^{IUCN} - ICMBio status EX
- Pulsatrix perspicillata pulsatrix (spectacled owl) NE - ICMBio status VU
- Strix huhula albomarginata (black-banded owl) NE - ICMBio status VU

=== Order Nyctibiiformes (potoos) ===
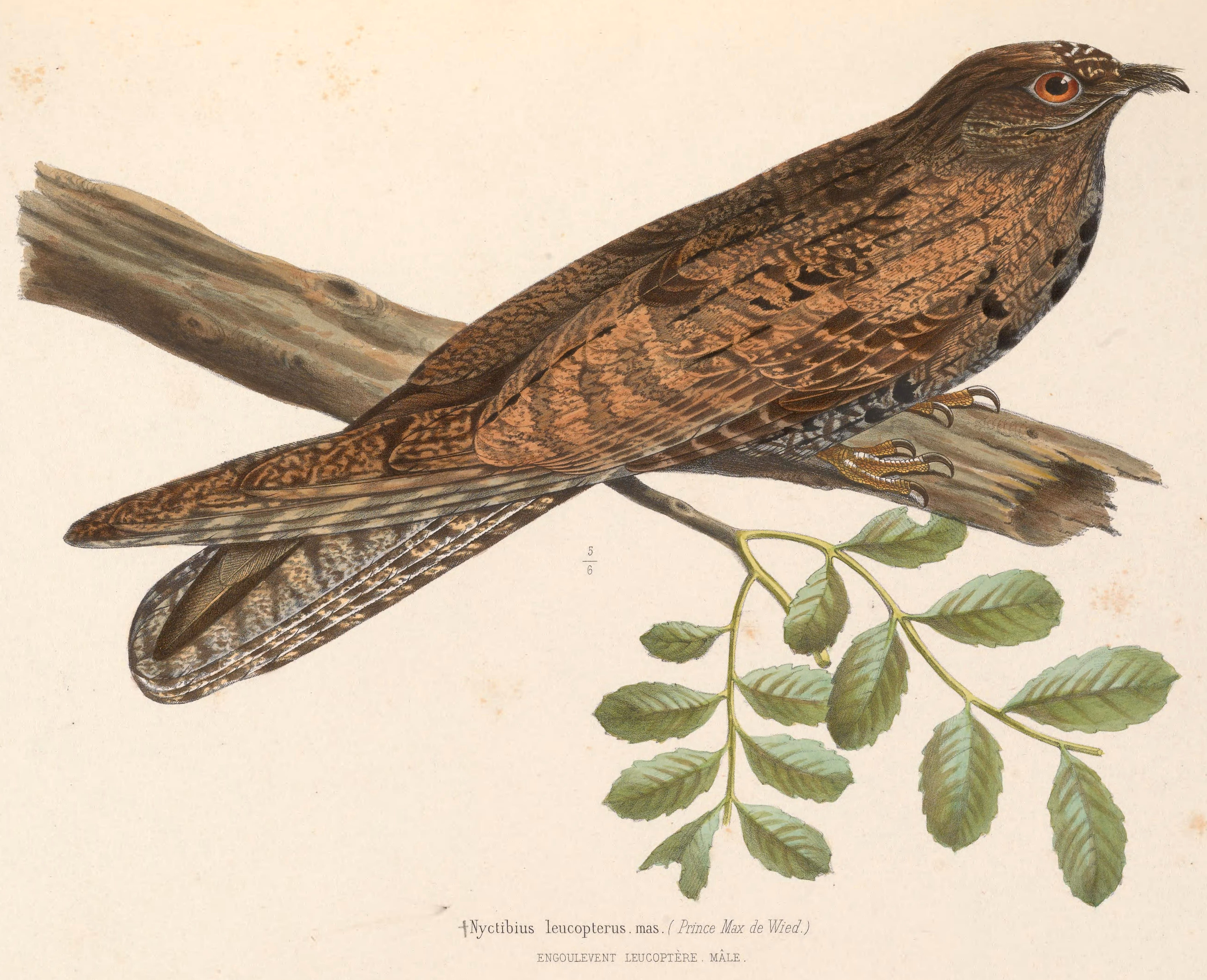
The white-winged potoo (Nyctibius leucopterus) is a critically endangered species in Brazil.

Family Nyctibiidae

- Nyctibius aethereus aethereus (long-tailed potoo) NE - ICMBio status EN
- Nyctibius leucopterus (white-winged potoo) LC^{IUCN} - ICMBio status CR

=== Ordem Caprimulgiformes (nightjars) ===
Family Caprimulgidae

- Hydropsalis candicans (white-winged nightjar) EN^{IUCN} - ICMBio status VU

=== Order Apodiformes (hummingbirds and swifts) ===
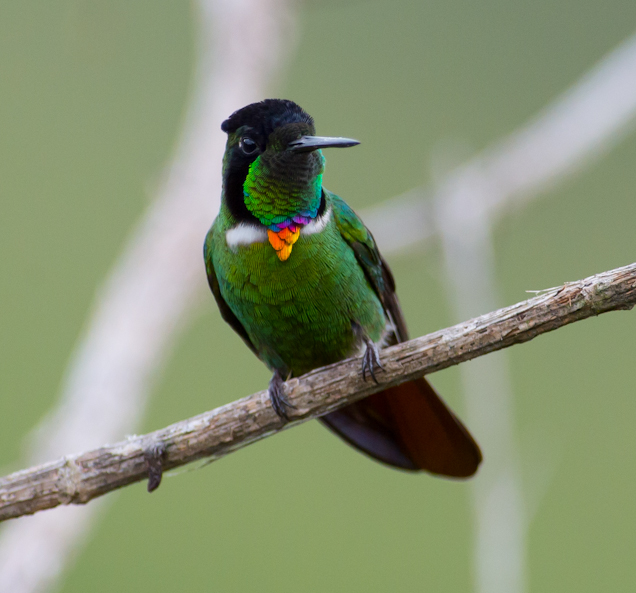
The hooded visorbearer (Augastes lumachella) is an endangered species.

Family Trochilidae (hummingbirds)

- Augastes lumachella (hooded visorbearer) NT^{IUCN} - ICMBio status EN
- Discosura langsdorffi langsdorffi (black-bellied thorntail) NE - ICMBio status EN
- Glaucis dohrnii (hook-billed hermit) EN^{IUCN} - ICMBio status EN
- Lophornis gouldii (dot-eared coquette) VU^{IUCN} - ICMBio status VU
- Phaethornis aethopygus (Tapajós hermit) NT^{IUCN} - Estado ICMBio VU
- Phaethornis bourcieri major (straight-billed hermit) NE - ICMBio status VU
- Phaethornis margarettae (great-billed hermit) LC^{IUCN} - ICMBio status EN
- Phaethornis margarettae camargoi (great-billed hermit) NE - ICMBio status CR
- Thalurania watertonii (long-tailed woodnymph) EN^{IUCN} - ICMBio status EN

=== Order Trogoniformes (trogons) ===
Family Trogonidae

- Trogon collaris eytoni (collared trogon) NE - ICMBio status EN

=== Order Coraciiformes (kingfishers, bee-eaters, rollers and motmots) ===
Family Momotidae (motmots)

- Momotus momota marcgraviana (blue-crowned motmot) NE - ICMBio status EN

=== Ordem Galbuliformes (puffbirds) ===
Family Bucconidae

- Monasa morphoeus morphoeus (white-fronted nunbird) NE - ICMBio status EN

=== Order Piciformes (woodpeckers and toucans) ===
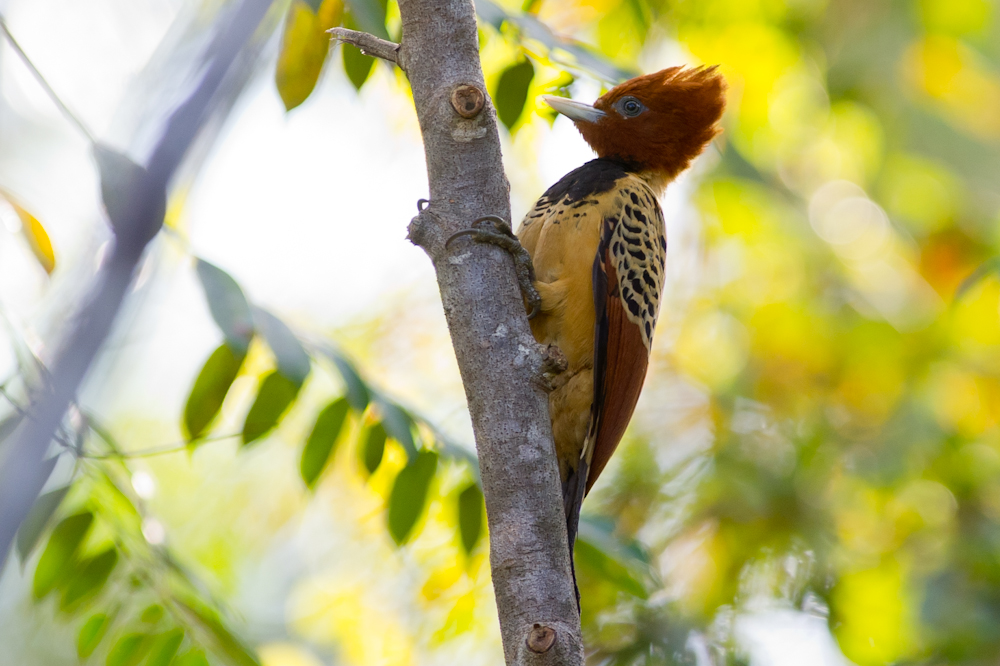
The Kaempfer's woodpecker (Celeus obrieni) is an endemic woodpecker from Piauí.

Family Capitonidae (American barbets)

- Capito dayi (black-girdled barbet) VU^{IUCN} - ICMBio status VU

Family Ramphastidae (toucans)

- Pteroglossus bitorquatus bitorquatus (red-necked aracari) EN^{IUCN} - ICMBio status VU
- Selenidera gouldii baturitensis (Gould's toucanet) LC^{IUCN} - ICMBio status EN

Family Picidae (woodpeckers)

- Celeus flavus subflavus (cream-colored woodpecker) NE - ICMBio status CR
- Celeus obrieni (Kaempfer's woodpecker) EN^{IUCN} - ICMBio status VU
- Celeus torquatus pieteroyensi (ringed woodpecker) NE - ICMBio status EN
- Celeus torquatus tinnunculus (Atlantic black-breasted woodpecker) VU^{IUCN} - ICMBio status VU
- Dryocopus galeatus (helmeted woodpecker) VU^{IUCN} - ICMBio status EN
- Piculus polyzonus NE - ICMBio status EN
- Piculus paraensis NE - ICMBio status EN
- Picumnus varzeae (Varzea piculet) EN^{IUCN} - ICMBio status EN

=== Order Psittaciformes (parrots, macaws, parakeets) ===
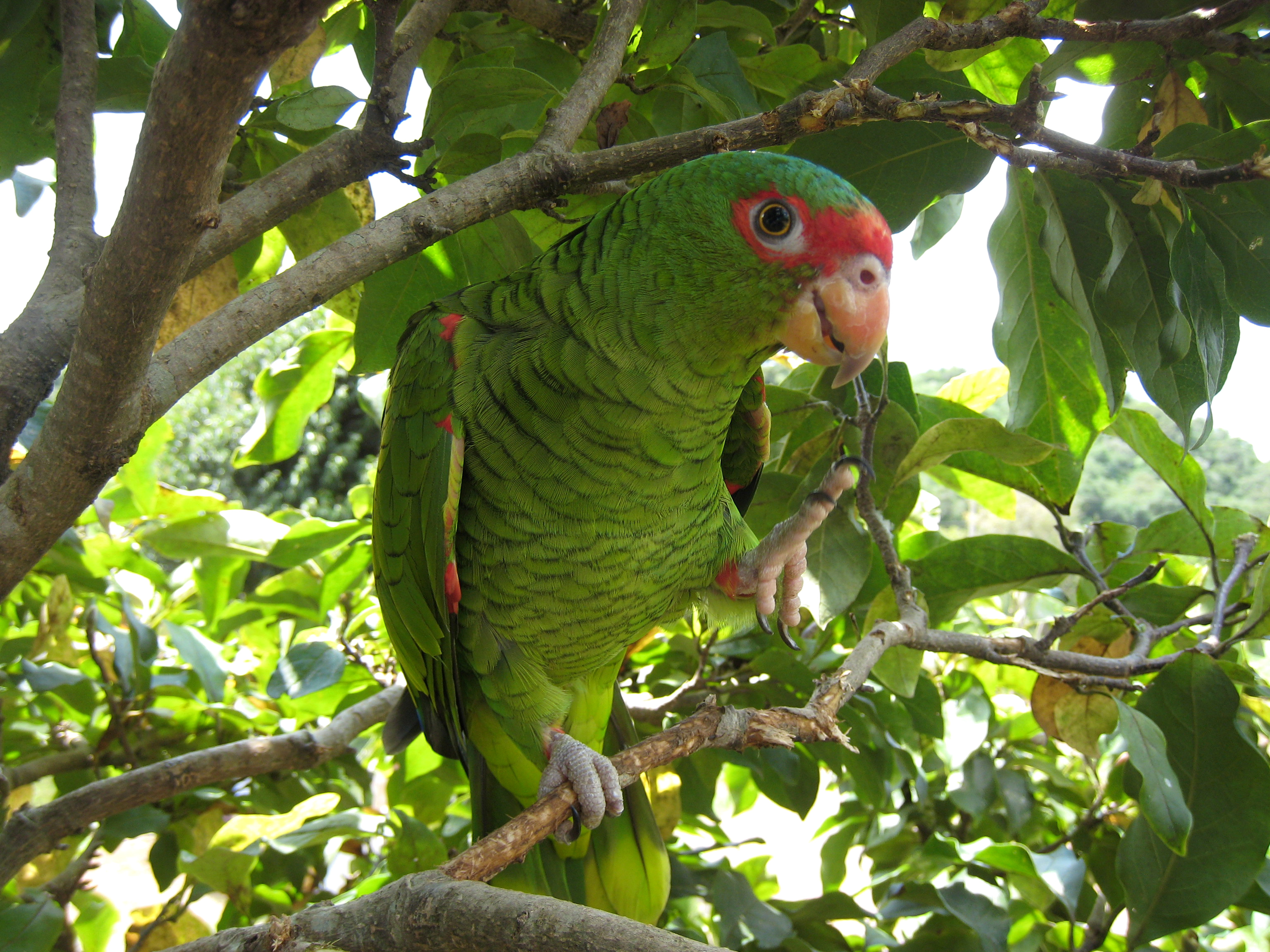
The red-spectacled amazon (Amazona petrei) is a vulnerable species from southern Brazil.

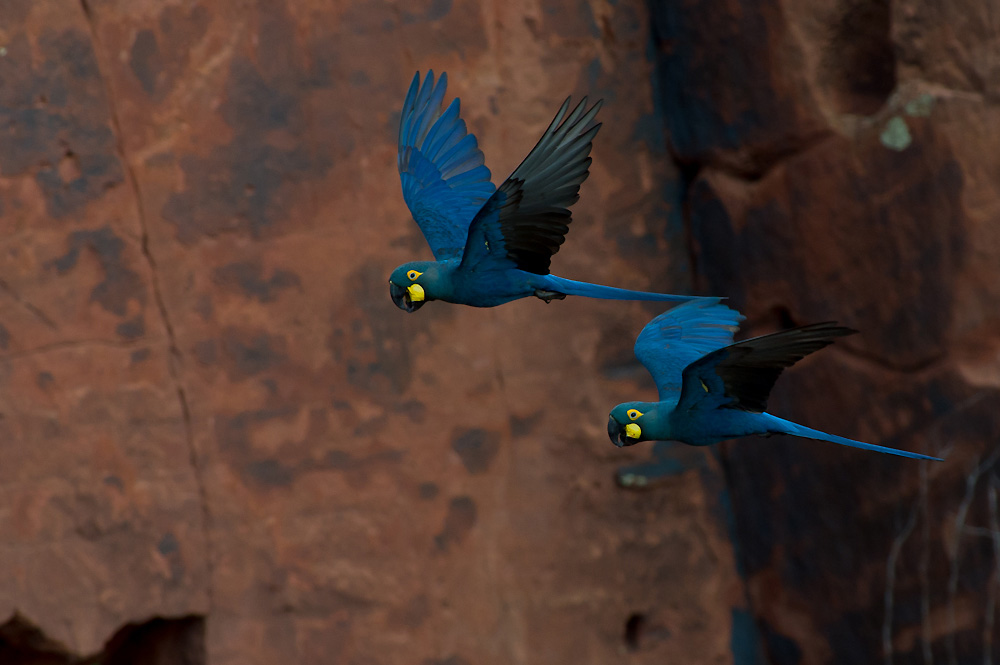
Lear's macaw (Anodorhynchus leari) is an endangered macaw from Northeastern Brazil.

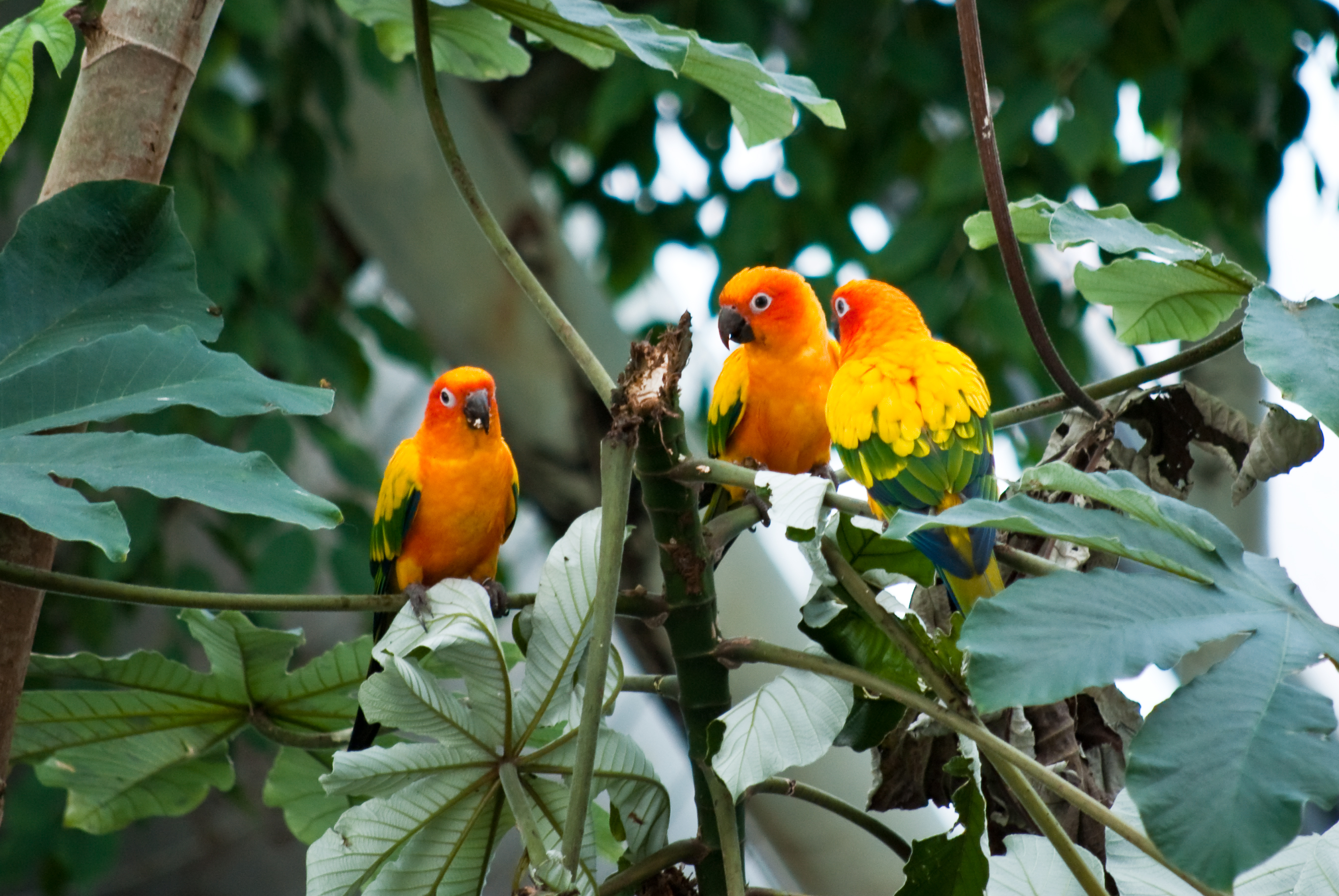
The sun parakeet (Aratinga solstitialis) is an endangered species.

Family Psittacidae

- Amazona pretrei (red-spectacled amazon) VU^{IUCN} - ICMBio status VU
- Amazona rhodocorytha (red-browed amazon) EN^{IUCN} - ICMBio status VU
- Amazona vinacea (vinaceous-breasted amazon) EN^{IUCN} - ICMBio status VU
- Anodorhynchus leari (Lear's macaw) EN^{IUCN} - ICMBio status EN
- Anodorhynchus glaucus (glaucous macaw) CR^{IUCN} - ICMBio status EX
- Aratinga solstitialis (sun parakeet) EN^{IUCN} - ICMBio status EN
- Cyanopsitta spixii (Spix's macaw) CR^{IUCN} - ICMBio status CR(PExW)
- Guaruba guarouba (golden parakeet) VU^{IUCN} - ICMBio status VU
- Pionus reichenowi (Reichenow's blue-headed parrot) LC^{IUCN} - ICMBio status VU
- Pyrilia vulturina (vulturine parrot) VU^{IUCN} - ICMBio status VU
- Pyrrhura cruentata (ochre-marked parakeet) VU^{IUCN} - ICMBio status VU
- Pyrrhura lepida (pearly parakeet) VU^{IUCN} - ICMBio status VU
- Pyrrhura lepida lepida (pearly parakeet) NE - ICMBio status VU
- Pyrrhura griseipectus (grey-breasted parakeet) CR^{IUCN} - ICMBio status EN
- Pyrrhura leucotis (white-eared parakeet) NT^{IUCN} - ICMBio status VU
- Pyrrhura pfrimeri (Pfrimer's parakeet) EN^{IUCN} - ICMBio status EN
- Touit melanonotus (brown-backed parrotlet) EN^{IUCN} - ICMBio status VU
- Touit surdus (golden-tailed parrotlet) VU^{IUCN} - ICMBio status VU

=== Order Passeriformes (songbirds) ===
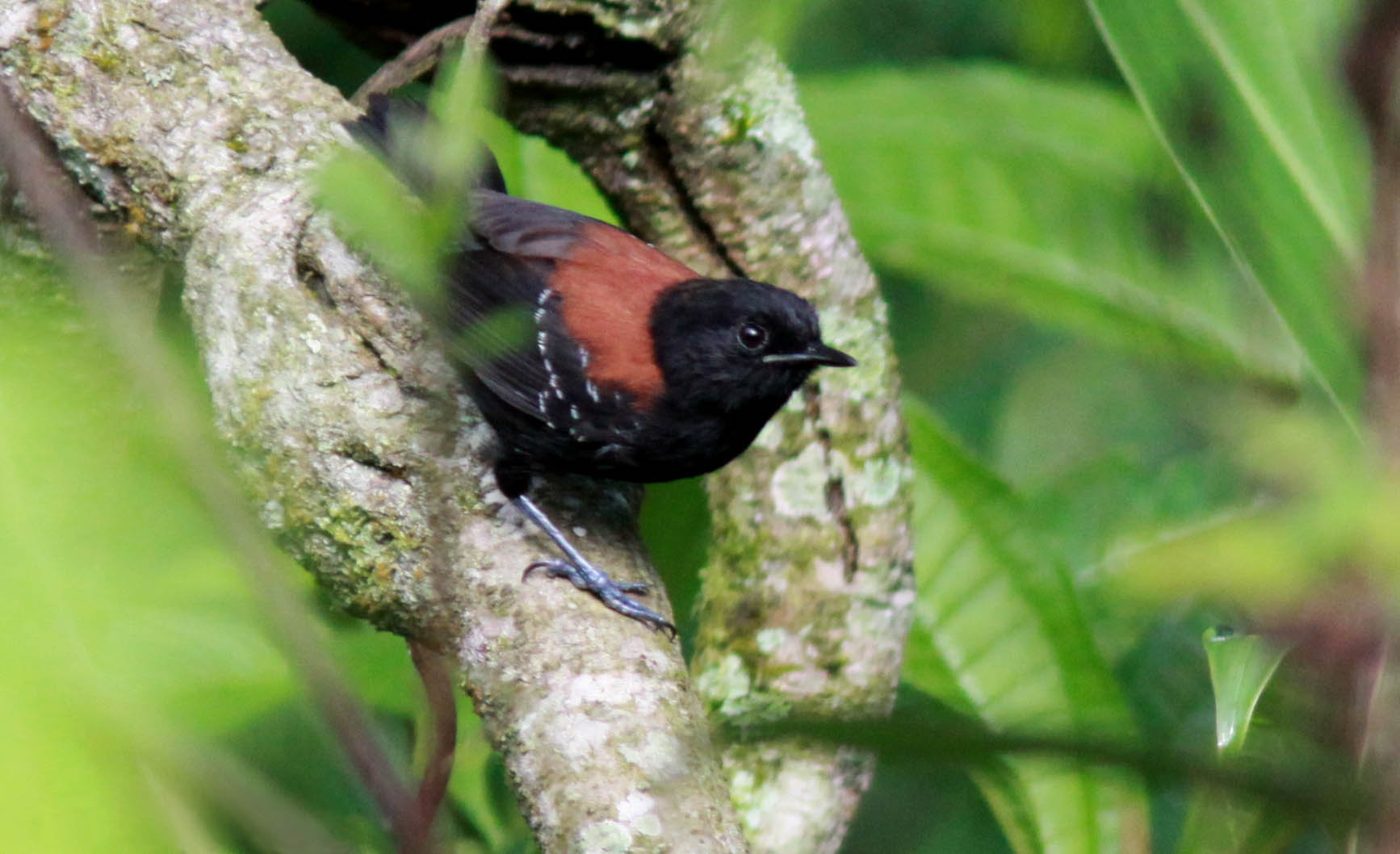
The black-hooded antwren (Formicivora erythronotos) is a critically endangered species from Rio de Janeiro.

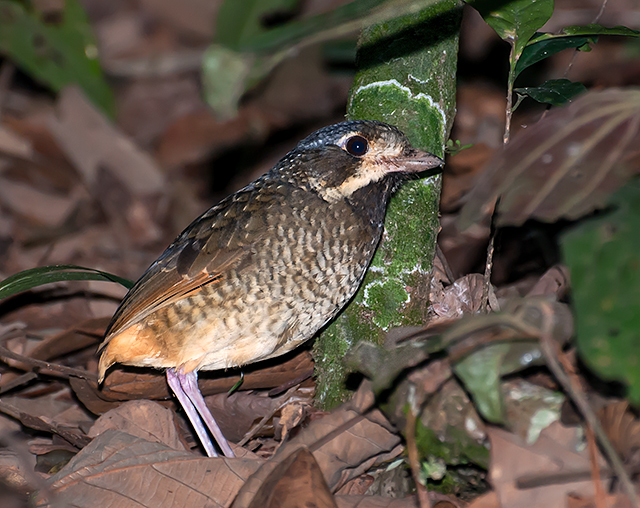
The variegated antpitta (Grallaria varia) is a vulnerable species.

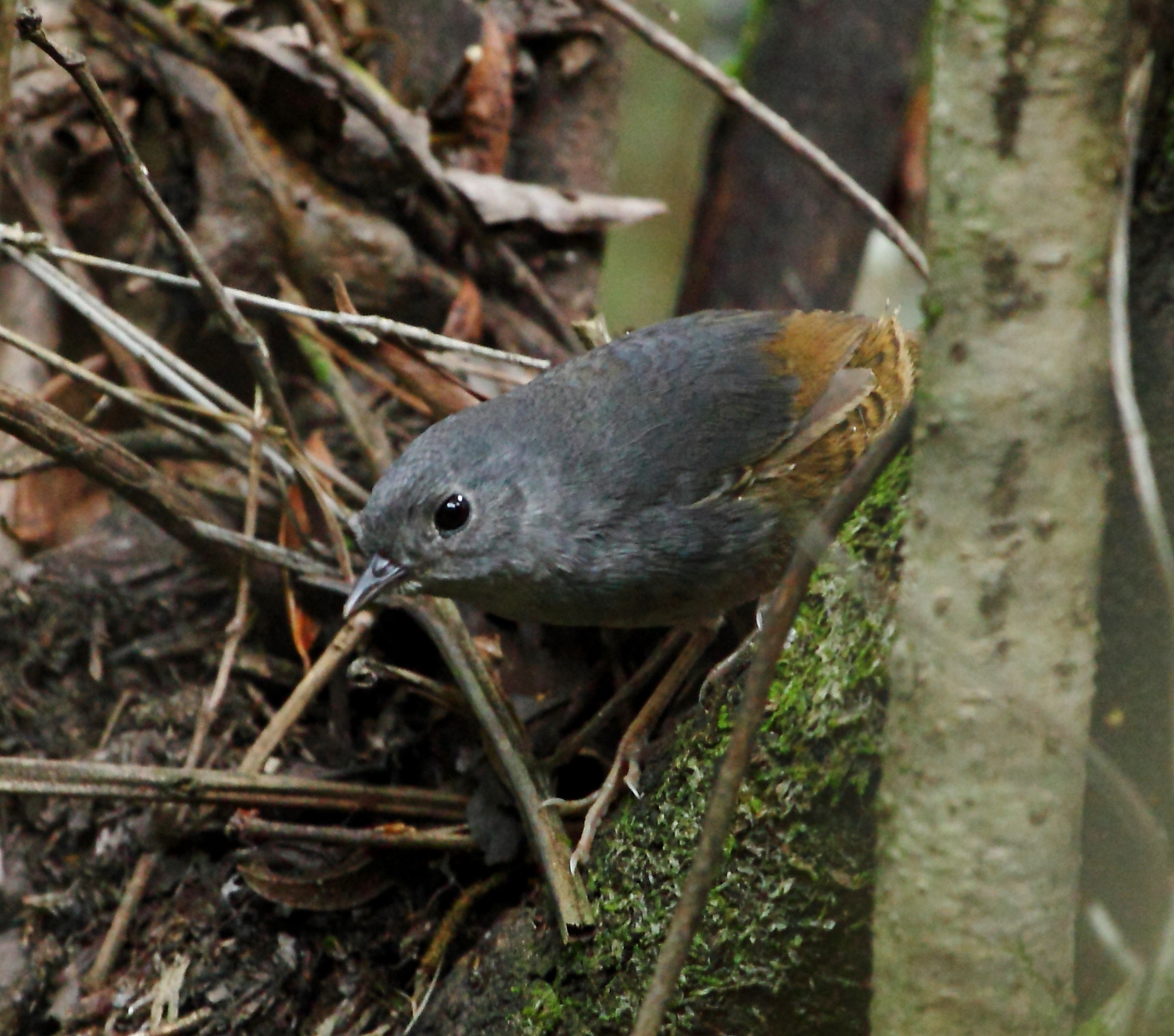
The Brasília tapaculo (Scytalopus novacapitalis) is an endangered species.

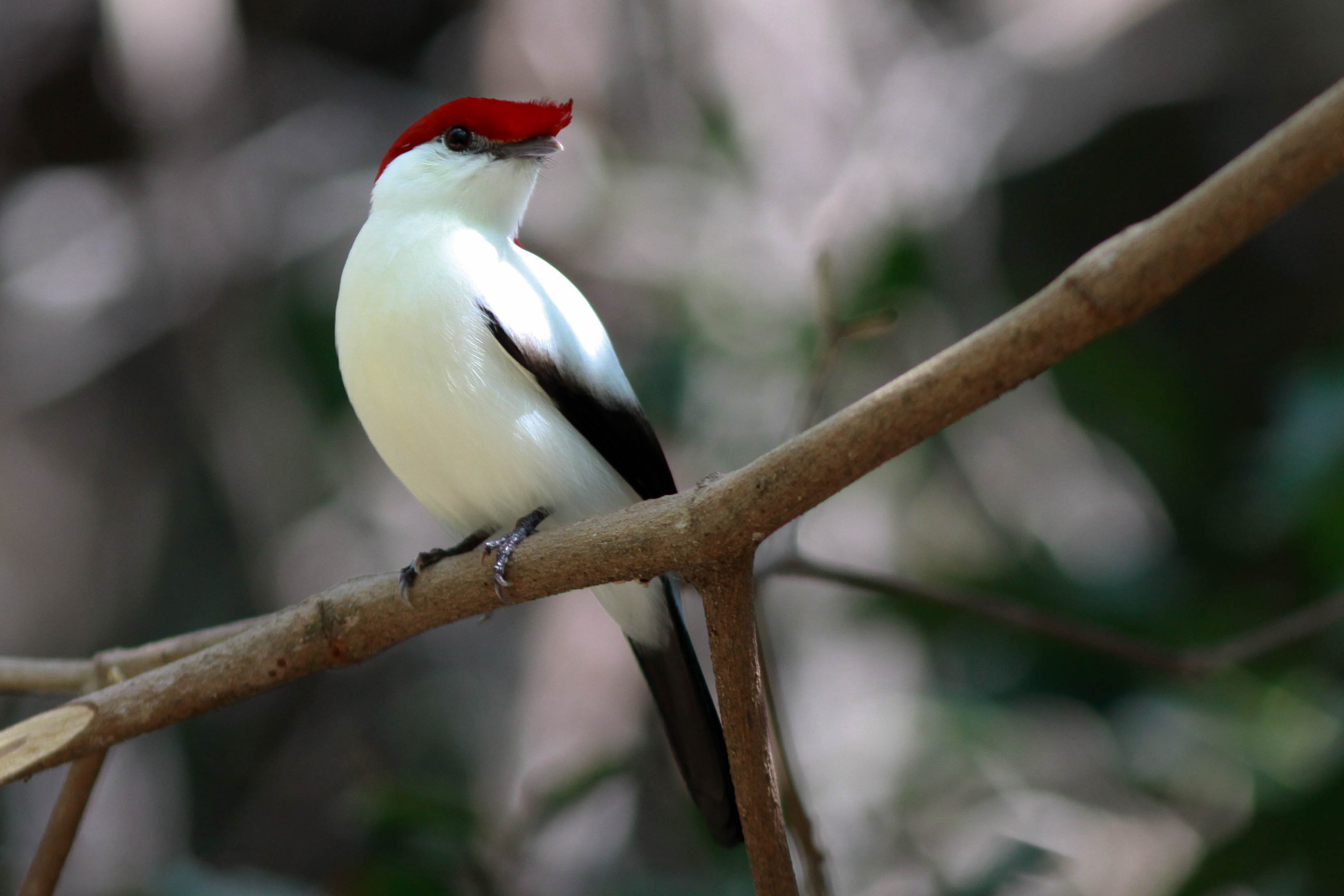
The Araripe manakin (Antilophia bokermanni) is a critically endangered endemic species from Chapada do Araripe.

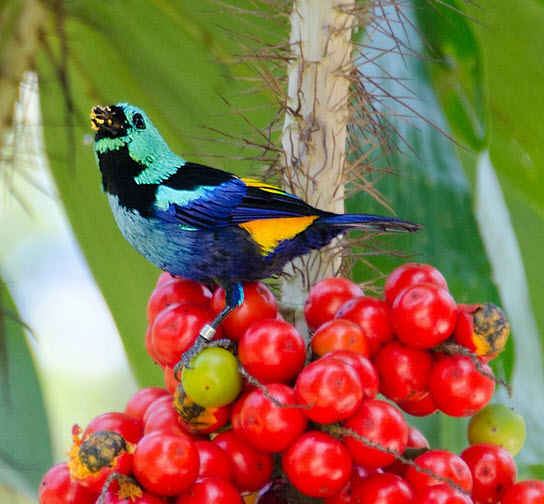
The seven-colored tanager (Tangara fastuosa) is an endemic vulnerable species from Pernambuco.

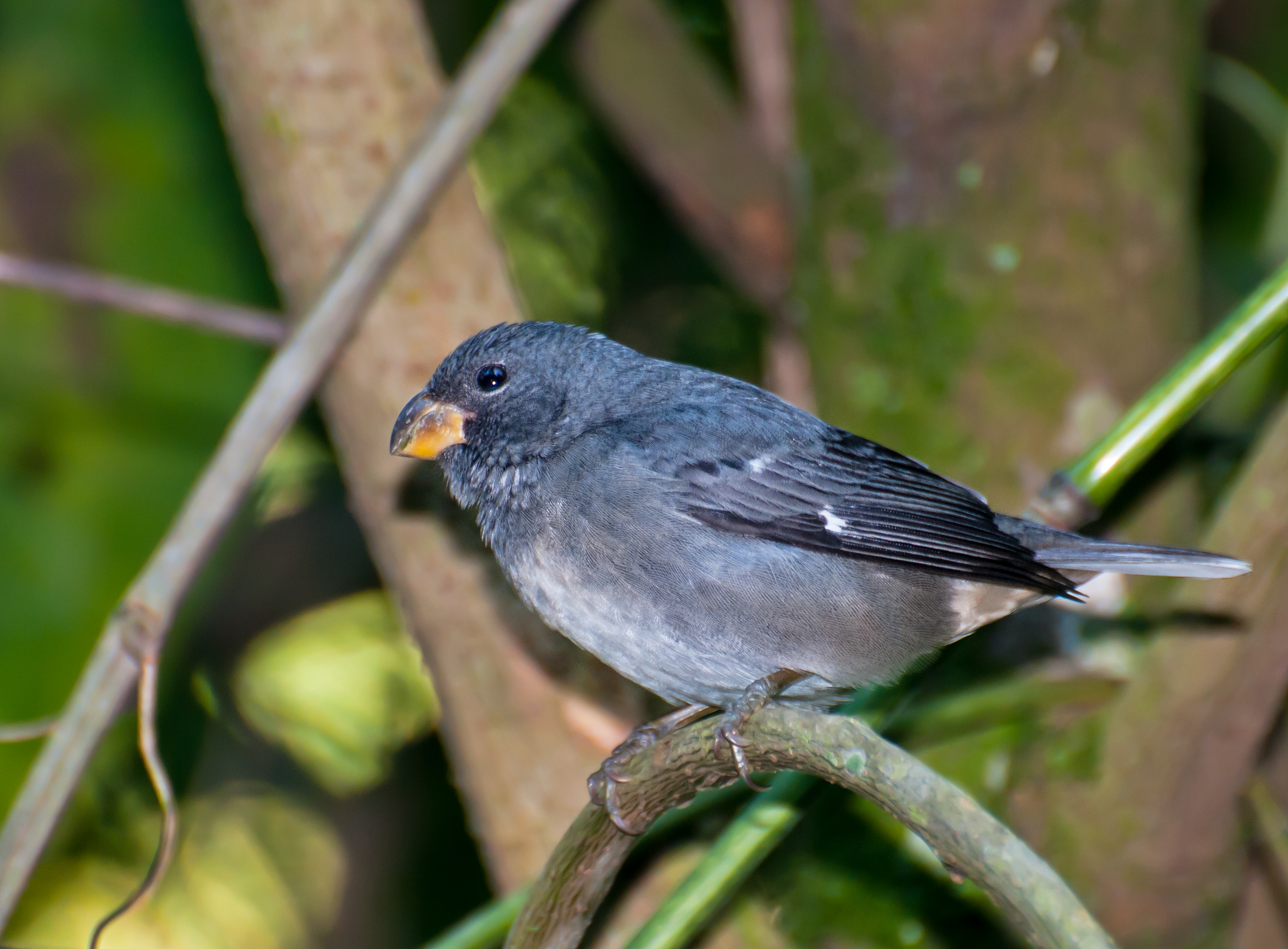
Temminck's seedeater (Sporophila falcirostris) is a vulnerable species.

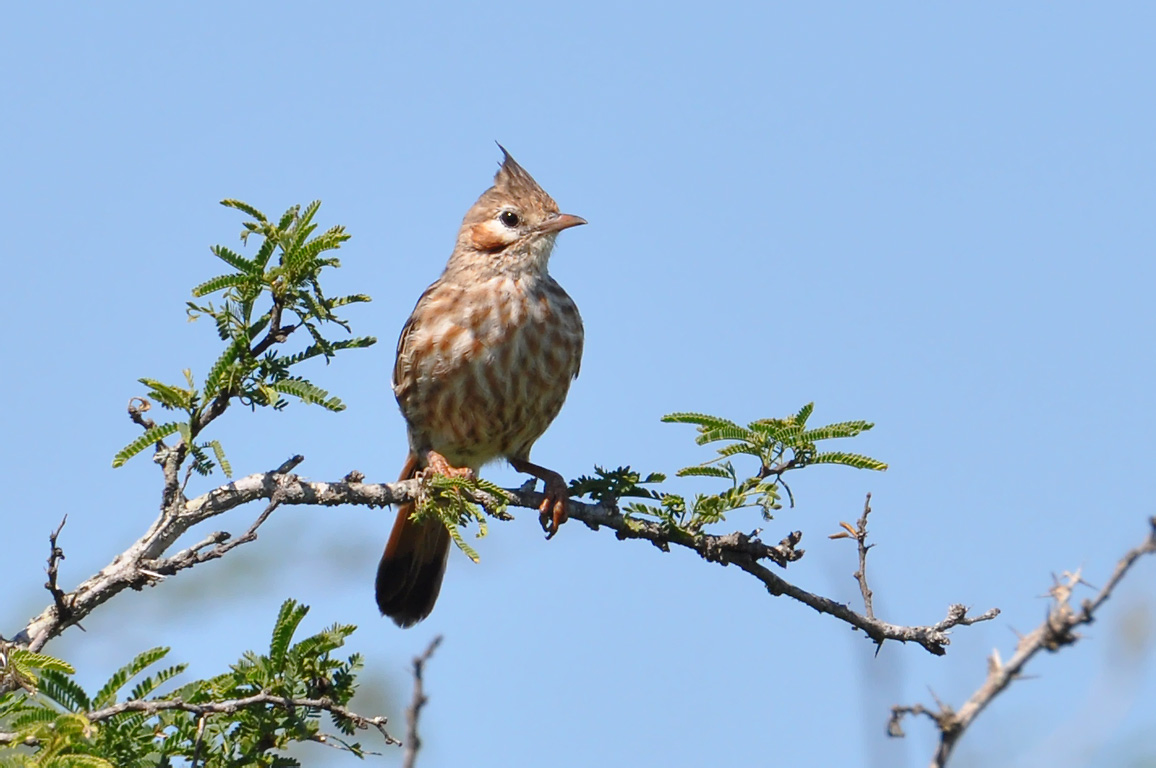
The lark-like brushrunner (Coryphistera alaudina) is a critically endangered species.

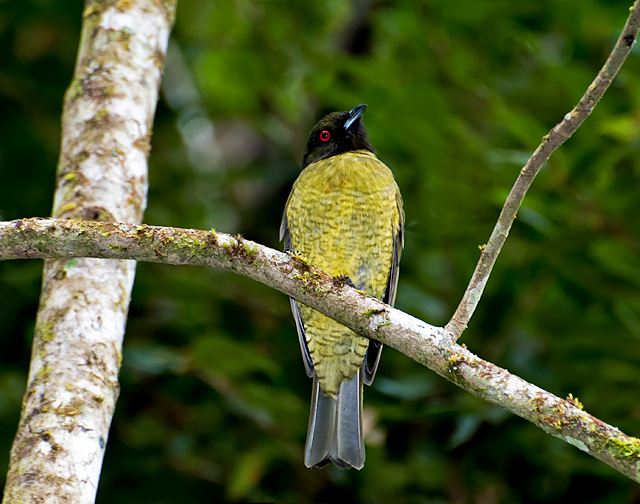
The black-headed berryeater (Carpornis melanocephala) is a vulnerable species.

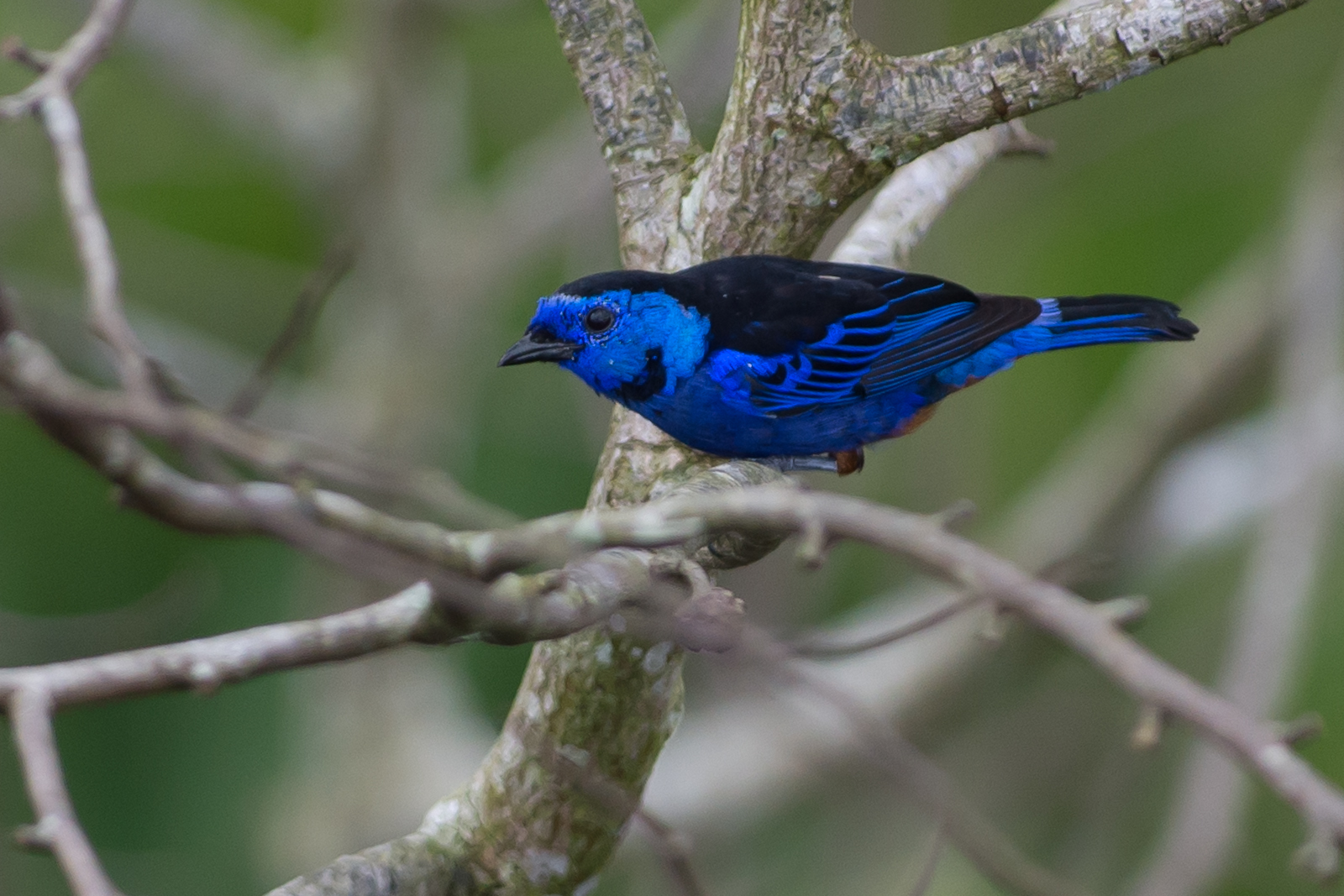
The opal-rumped tanager (Tangara velia signata) is a vulnerable species.

Family Thamnophilidae (antbirds)

- Cercomacra ferdinandi (bananal antbird) VU^{IUCN} - ICMBio status VU
- Dysithamnus plumbeus (plumbeous antvireo) VU^{IUCN} - ICMBio status EN
- Formicivora erythronotos (black-hooded antwren) EN^{IUCN} - ICMBio status CR
- Formicivora grantsaui (Sincorá antwren) NT^{IUCN} - ICMBio status EN
- Formicivora littoralis (Restinga antwren) EN^{IUCN} - ICMBio status EN
- Formicivora paludicola (São Paulo marsh antwren) NE - ICMBio status CR
- Herpsilochmus pileatus (Bahia antwren) VU^{IUCN} - ICMBio status VU
- Hypocnemis ochrogyna (Rondonia warbling antbird) LC^{IUCN} - ICMBio status VU
- Myrmoderus ruficaudus NE - ICMBio status EN
- Myrmotherula fluminensis (Rio de Janeiro antwren) CR^{IUCN} - ICMBio status CR(PEx)
- Myrmotherula klagesi (Klages's antwren) NT^{IUCN} - ICMBio status VU
- Myrmotherula minor (Salvadori's antwren) VU^{IUCN} - ICMBio status VU
- Myrmotherula snowi (Alagoas antwren) CR^{IUCN} - ICMBio status CR
- Myrmotherula urosticta (band-tailed antwren) VU^{IUCN} - ICMBio status VU
- Phlegopsis nigromaculata confinis (black-spotted bare-eye) NE - ICMBio status VU
- Phlegopsis nigromaculata paraensis (black-spotted bare-eye) NE - ICMBio status VU
- Pyriglena pernambucensis (Pernambuco fire-eye) NE - ICMBio status VU
- Pyriglena atra (fringe-backed fire-eye) EN - ICMBio status EN
- Rhegmatorhina gymnops (bare-eyed antbird) VU - ICMBio status VU
- Rhopornis ardesiacus (slender antbird) EN^{IUCN} - ICMBio status EN
- Stymphalornis acutirostris (marsh antwren) EN^{IUCN} - ICMBio status EN
- Terenura sicki (orange-bellied antwren) EN^{IUCN} - ICMBio status CR
- Thamnomanes caesius caesius (cinereous antshrike) NE - ICMBio status VU
- Thamnophilus aethiops (white-shouldered antshrike) LC^{IUCN} - ICMBio status EN
- Thamnophilus caerulescens cearensis (variable antshrike) NE - ICMBio status VU
- Thamnophilus caerulescens pernambucensis (variable antshrike) NE - ICMBio status VU
- Thamnophilus nigrocinereus (blackish-grey antshrike) NT^{IUCN} - ICMBio status EN

Family Conopophagidae (gnateaters)

- Conopophaga lineata cearae (rufous gnateater) NE - ICMBio status EN
- Conopophaga lineata lineata (rufous gnateater) LC^{IUCN} - ICMBio status VU
- Conopophaga melanops nigrifrons (black-cheeked gnateater) NE - ICMBio status VU

Family Grallariidae (antpittas)

- Grallaria varia distincta (variegated antpitta) NE - ICMBio status VU
- Grallaria varia intercedens (variegated antpitta) NE - ICMBio status VU
- Hylopezus paraensis (Snethlage's antpitta) NE - ICMBio status VU

Family Rhinocryptidae (tapaculos)

- Eleoscytalopus psychopompus (Bahia tapaculo) EN^{IUCN} - ICMBio status EN
- Merulaxis stresemanni (Stresemann's bristlefront) CR^{IUCN} - ICMBio status CR
- Scytalopus diamantinensis (Diamantina tapaculo) NT^{IUCN} - ICMBio status CR
- Scytalopus gonzagai (Bahian mouse-colored tapaculo) NE - ICMBio status EN
- Scytalopus iraiensis (marsh tapaculo) EN^{IUCN} - ICMBio status EN
- Scytalopus novacapitalis (Brasília tapaculo) NT^{IUCN} - ICMBio status EN

Family Formicariidae (ground antbirds)

- Chamaeza nobilis (striated antthrush) LC^{IUCN} - ICMBio status VU

Family Scleruridae (miners and leaftossers)

- Geositta poeciloptera (campo miner) VU^{IUCN} - ICMBio status EN
- Sclerurus macconnelli bahiae (tawny-throated leaftosser) NE - ICMBio status VU
- Sclerurus caudacutus caligineus (black-tailed leaftosser) NE - ICMBio status CR
- Sclerurus caudacutus umbretta (black-tailed leaftosser) NE - ICMBio status CR

Family Dendrocolaptidae (woodcreepers)

- Campylorhamphus cardosoi (Tapajós scythebill) NE - ICMBio status VU
- Campylorhamphus multostriatus (Xingu curve-billed scythebill) NE - ICMBio status VU
- Campylorhamphus trochilirostris trochilirostris (red-billed scythebill) NE - ICMBio status EN
- Dendrexetastes rufigula paraensis (cinnamon-throated woodcreeper) NE - ICMBio status EN
- Dendrocincla taunayi (plain-winged woodcreeper) NE - ICMBio statusEN
- Dendrocincla merula badia (white-chinned woodcreeper) NE - ICMBio status VU
- Dendrocolaptes retentus (Xingu woodcreeper) NE - ICMBio status VU
- Dendrocolaptes medius (Amazonian barred woodcreeper) NE - ICMBio status VU
- Dendrocolaptes picumnus transfasciatus (black-banded woodcreeper) NE - ICMBio status VU
- Hylexetastes brigidai (Brigida's woodcreeper) VU^{IUCN} - ICMBio status VU
- Lepidocolaptes wagleri (Wagler's woodcreeper) NE - ICMBio status EN
- Xiphocolaptes carajaensis (Carajás woodcreeper) NE - ICMBio status VU
- Xiphocolaptes falcirostris (moustached woodcreeper) VU^{IUCN} - ICMBio status VU
- Xiphorhynchus atlanticus (lesser woodcreeper) NE - Estado ICMBio VU

Família Xenopidae (ovenbirds)

- Xenops minutus alagoanus (plain xenops) NE - ICMBio status VU
- Xiphorhynchus guttatus gracilirostris (buff-throated woodcreeper) NE - ICMBio status EN

Family Furnariidae (Neotropical ovenbirds)

- Acrobatornis fonsecai (pink-legged graveteiro) VU^{IUCN} - ICMBio status VU
- Asthenes hudsoni (Hudson's canastero) NT^{IUCN} - ICMBio status VU
- Automolus lammi (Pernambuco foliage-gleaner) VU^{IUCN} - ICMBio status EN
- Cichlocolaptes mazarbarnetti (cryptic treehunter) NE - ICMBio status EX
- Coryphistera alaudina (lark-like brushrunner) LC^{IUCN} - ICMBio status CR
- Cranioleuca muelleri (scaled spinetail) EN^{IUCN} - ICMBio status VU
- Cinclodes espinhacensis (long-tailed cinclodes) NE - ICMBio status EN
- Leptasthenura platensis (tufted tit-spinetail) LC^{IUCN} - ICMBio status CR
- Philydor novaesi (Alagoas foliage-gleaner) CR^{IUCN} - ICMBio status EX
- Pseudoseisura lophotes (brown cacholote) LC^{IUCN} - ICMBio status VU
- Synallaxis infuscata (Pinto's spinetail) EN^{IUCN} - ICMBio status EN
- Synallaxis kollari (hoary-throated spinetail) CR^{IUCN} - ICMBio status EN
- Thripophaga macroura (striated softtail) VU^{IUCN} - ICMBio status VU

Family Pipridae (manakins)

- Antilophia bokermanni (Araripe manakin) CR^{IUCN} - ICMBio status CR
- Lepidothrix vilasboasi (golden-crowned manakin) VU^{IUCN} - ICMBio status VU
- Lepidothrix iris (opal-crowned manakin) VU^{IUCN} - ICMBio status EN
- Lepidothrix iris iris (cabeça-de-prata) VU^{IUCN} - ICMBio status EN
- Neopelma aurifrons (Wied's tyrant-manakin) VU^{IUCN} - ICMBio status EN

Family Tityridae (tityras, mourners and allies)

- Iodopleura pipra (buff-throated purpletuft) NT^{IUCN} - ICMBio status EN
- Iodopleura pipra leucopygia (buff-throated purpletuft) NE - ICMBio status CR
- Iodopleura pipra pipra (buff-throated purpletuft) NT^{IUCN} - ICMBio status EN
- Schiffornis turdina intermedia (brown-winged schiffornis) NE - ICMBio status VU

Family Cotingidae (cotingas and bellbirds)

- Carpornis melanocephala (black-headed berryeater) VU^{IUCN} - ICMBio status VU
- Cotinga maculata (banded cotinga) EN^{IUCN} - ICMBio status CR
- Procnias albus wallacei (white bellbird) NE - ICMBio status VU
- Tijuca condita (grey-winged cotinga) VU^{IUCN} - ICMBio status VU
- Xipholena atropurpurea (white-winged cotinga) EN^{IUCN} - ICMBio status VU

Family Pipritidae (piprites)

- piprites chloris grisescens (wing-barred piprites) NE - ICMBio status VU

Family Platyrinchidae (calyptura)

- Calyptura cristata (kinglet calyptura) CR^{IUCN} - ICMBio status CR(PEx)

Family Rhynchocyclidae (tody-tyrants or bamboo tyrants)

- Hemitriccus furcatus (fork-tailed tody-tyrant) VU^{IUCN} - ICMBio status VU
- Hemitriccus griseipectus naumburgae (white-bellied tody-tyrant) NE - ICMBio status VU
- Hemitriccus kaempferi (Kaempfer's tody-tyrant) EN^{IUCN} - ICMBio status VU
- Hemitriccus mirandae (buff-breasted tody-tyrant) VU^{IUCN} - ICMBio status VU
- Phylloscartes beckeri (Bahia tyrannulet) EN^{IUCN} - ICMBio status EN
- Phylloscartes ceciliae (Alagoas tyrannulet) EN^{IUCN} - ICMBio status CR

Family Tyrannidae (tyrant flycatchers)

- Alectrurus tricolor (cock-tailed tyrant) VU^{IUCN} - ICMBio status VU
- Attila spadiceus uropygiatus (Bright-rumped attila) NE - ICMBio status VU
- Elaenia ridleyana (Noronha elaenia) VU^{IUCN} - ICMBio status VU
- Platyrinchus mystaceus niveigularis (white-throated spadebill) NE - ICMBio status VU
- Serpophaga hypoleuca pallida (river tyrannulet) NE - ICMBio status VU
- Stigmatura napensis napensis (lesser wagtail-tyrant) NE - ICMBio status VU
- Xolmis dominicanus (black-and-white monjita) VU^{IUCN} - ICMBio status VU

Family Vireonidae (vireos)

- Hylophilus ochraceiceps rubrifrons (tawny-crowned greenlet) NE - ICMBio status VU
- Vireo gracilirostris (Noronha vireo) NT^{IUCN} - ICMBio status VU

Family Corvidae (crows and jays)

- Cyanocorax hafferi (Campina jay) NE - ICMBio status VU

Family Turidade (thrushes)

- Cichlopsis leucogenys (rufous-brown solitaire) LC^{IUCN} - ICMBio status EN

Family Motacillidae (pipits)

- Anthus nattereri (ochre-breasted pipit) VU^{IUCN} - ICMBio status VU

Family Passerellidae (New World sparrows)

- Arremonops conirostris (black-striped sparrow) LC^{IUCN} - ICMBio status VU

Family Icteridae (New World blackbirds)

- Curaeus forbesi (Forbes's blackbird) EN^{IUCN} - ICMBio status VU
- Sturnella defilippii (Pampas meadowlark) VU^{IUCN} - ICMBio status EX
- Xanthopsar flavus (saffron-cowled blackbird) VU^{IUCN} - ICMBio status VU

Family Thraupidae (tanagers)

- Conothraupis mesoleuca (cone-billed tanager) CR^{IUCN} - ICMBio status EN
- Coryphaspiza melanotis (black-masked finch) VU^{IUCN} - ICMBio status EN
- Gubernatrix cristata (yellow cardinal) EN^{IUCN} - ICMBio status CR
- Nemosia rourei (cherry-throated tanager) CR^{IUCN} - ICMBio status CR
- Sporophila beltoni (Tropeiro seedeater) NE - ICMBio status VU
- Sporophila falcirostris (Temminck's seedeater) VU^{IUCN} - ICMBio status VU
- Sporophila frontalis (buffy-fronted seedeater) VU^{IUCN} - ICMBio status VU
- Sporophila hypoxantha (tawny-bellied seedeater) LC^{IUCN} - ICMBio status VU
- Sporophila maximiliani (great-billed seed finch) VU^{IUCN} - ICMBio status CR
- Sporophila melanogaster (black-bellied seedeater) NT^{IUCN} - ICMBio status VU
- Sporophila nigrorufa (black-and-tawny seedeater) VU^{IUCN} - ICMBio status VU
- Sporophila palustris (marsh seedeater) EN^{IUCN} - ICMBio status VU
- Sporophila ruficollis (dark-throated seedeater) NT^{IUCN} - ICMBio status VU
- Tangara peruviana (black-backed tanager) VU^{IUCN} - ICMBio status VU
- Tangara cyanocephala cearensis (red-necked tanager) NE - ICMBio status VU
- Tangara fastuosa (seven-colored tanager) VU^{IUCN} - ICMBio status VU
- Tangara velia signata (opal-rumped tanager) NE - ICMBio status VU

Family Cardinalidae (cardinals)

- Caryothraustes canadensis frontalis (yellow-green grosbeak) NE - ICMBio status EN

Family Fringillidae (siskins)

- Sporagra yarrellii (yellow-faced siskin) VU^{IUCN} - ICMBio status VU

== See also ==
- List of birds of Brazil
