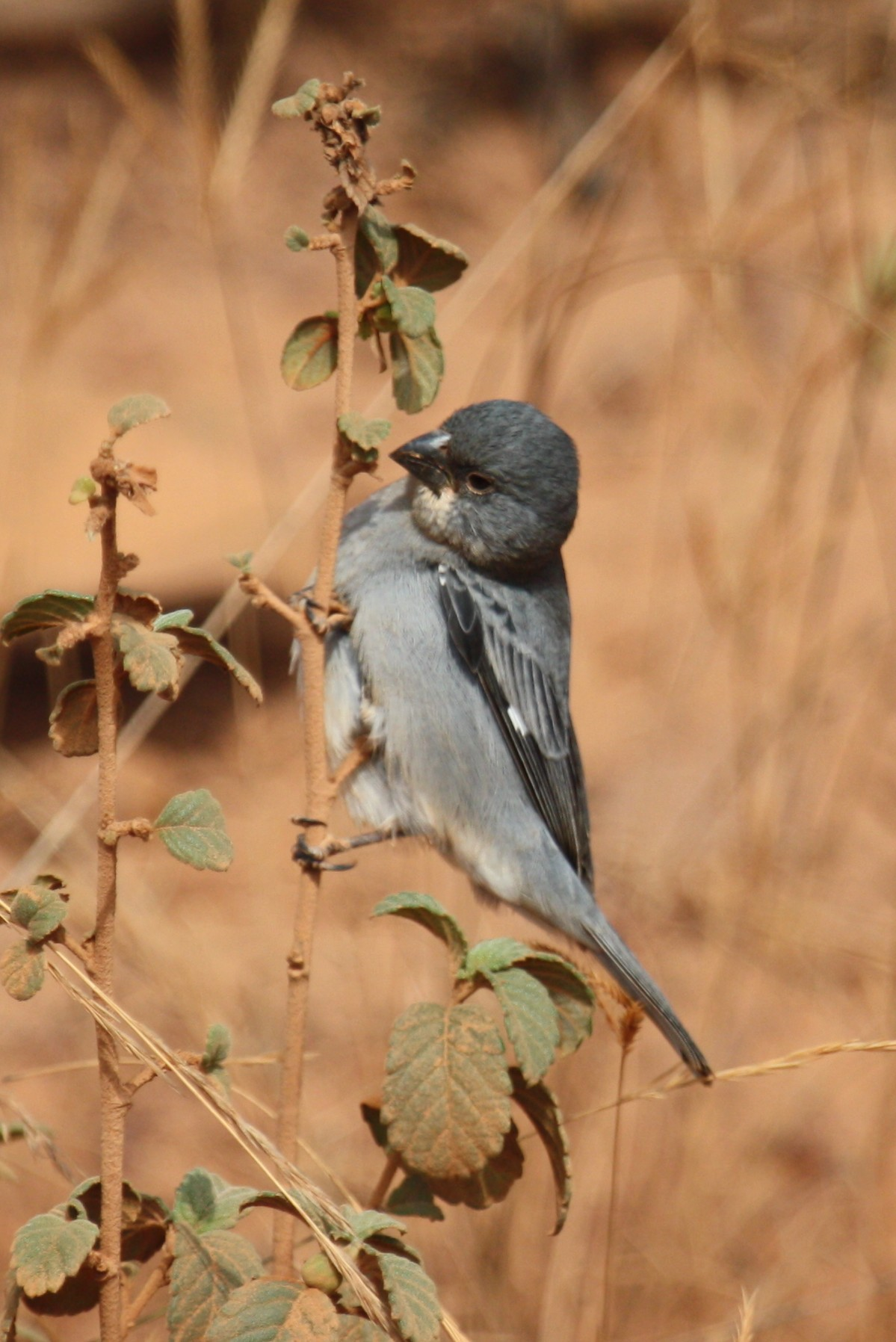
- In Cerrado habitat, Brazil

Conservation status
- Least Concern (IUCN 3.1)

Scientific classification
- Kingdom: Animalia
- Phylum: Chordata
- Class: Aves
- Order: Passeriformes
- Family: Thraupidae
- Genus: Sporophila
- Species: S. plumbea

Binomial name
- Sporophila plumbea (Wied-Neuwied, M, 1830)

= Plumbeous seedeater =

Species of bird

The plumbeous seedeater (Sporophila plumbea) is a species of bird in the family Thraupidae, the tanagers and allies. It is found in every mainland South American country except Chile, Ecuador, and Uruguay, though its presence in Argentina is unconfirmed.

== Taxonomy and systematics ==
The plumbeous seedeater has a complicated taxonomic history. It was formally described in 1830 with the binomial Fringilla plumbea and the common name "der bleifarbige Fink" [lead-colored finch]. By 1888 it had been reassigned to the genus Spermophila. By 1938 it had been reassigned to its present genus Sporophila, a genus in the family Emberizidae. Based on studies published between 1988 and 2011, beginning in 2012 Sporophila was moved to the tanager family Thraupidae.

The plumbeous seedeater has these three subspecies:

- S. p. colombiana (Sharpe, 1888)
- S. p. whiteleyana (Sharpe, 1888)
- S. p. plumbea (Wied-Neuwied, M, 1830)

What is now the Tropeiro seedeater (S. beltoni) was long thought to be a color morph of the plumbeous seedeater. It was recognized as a full species in 2013.

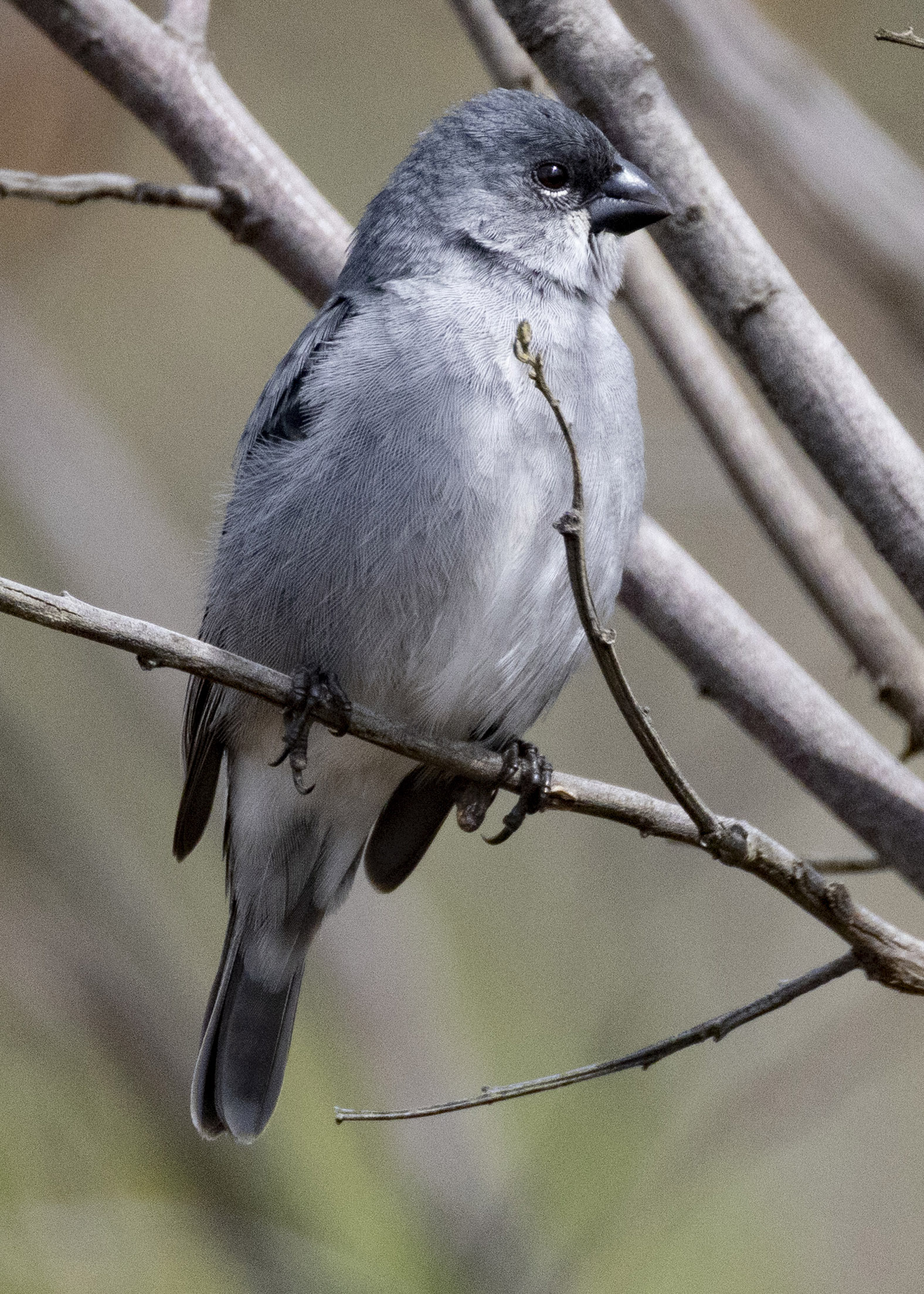
In northeastern Brazil

== Description ==
The plumbeous seedeater is 10.5 to 11 cm (4.1 to 4.3 in) long and weighs 8.8 to 12 g (0.31 to 0.42 oz). It has a thick bill with a rounded culmen. The species is sexually dimorphic. Adult males of the nominate subspecies S. p. plumbea have a lead-gray head with a pale arc under the eye and some faint darker streaks on the crown. Their upperparts are also lead-gray with faint darker streaks except on the rump. Their tail is blackish with very thin grayish olive edges and buffy tips on the feathers. Their wings' upper sides are blackish with olive-gray edges on the coverts, olive-brown edges on the tertials, and white bases on the primaries that show as a small square on the closed wing. Their chin and lower cheek are whitish, their throat and breast a paler gray than the upperparts, their belly and undertail coverts an even paler gray, and their vent almost whitish. Their wings' undersides are gray with white marginal coverts. Males of subspecies S. p. colombiana are overall a paler gray than the nominate with more white on the face and a white throat. Males of S. p. whiteleyana are like the nominate but for a more visible white arc under the eye and more white around the base of the bill. Adult females of all three subspecies have a brownish head, upperparts, tail, and wings without the male's white primaries. Their throat and underparts are mostly a paler buffy brown than the upperparts and with a whitish vent. Both sexes of all subspecies have a dark iris and black legs. Males have a black bill and females a dark maxilla and a horn-colored mandible. Juveniles resemble adult females with an entirely horn-colored bill.

== Distribution and habitat ==
The plumbeous seedeater has a disjunct distribution: No subspecies' range abuts another, and some subspecies have gaps within their ranges. The subspecies are found thus:

- S. p. colombiana: northern Colombia disjunctly in southern Chocó Department, the lower valley of the Magdalena River, and the Sierra Nevada de Santa Marta
- S. p. whiteleyana: Colombia in a triangle from approximately western Meta Department northeast into Venezuela; Venezuela primarily in Amazonas and Bolívar states with scattered records in the Serranía del Perijá on the Colombian border and in Carabobo and possibly Aragua states; and extending east through the Guianas and extreme northern Brazil's Roraima and northeastern Amapá states to the Atlantic
- S. p. plumbea: Junín Department and extreme southeastern Madre de Dios Department in southeastern Peru east through northern Bolivia into much of southern Brazil and eastern Paraguay. In Brazil it is within a line from Rondonia east almost to the Atlantic in Bahia, south to the Atlantic in Sao Paulo state and across northern Rio Grande do Sul. Several sources include northeastern Argentina's Misiones Province in the subspecies' range but the South American Classification Committee has only unconfirmed records from that country.

The plumbeous seedeater primarily inhabits wet savanna and grasslands, where it greatly favors tall grass and is usually near water. It also inhabits the edges of gallery forest, open cerrado, and groves of Mauritia palms. In elevation it is found in Colombia up to 1,500 m (4,900 ft), in Venezuela to 1,100 m (3,600 ft) north of the Orinoco River and to 1,400 m (4,600 ft) south of it, and in Brazil to 1,400 m (4,600 ft).

== Behavior ==
=== Movement ===
The plumbeous seedeater is mostly a year-round resident but appears to be migratory in the southernmost part of its range.

=== Feeding ===
The plumbeous seedeater feeds mostly on grass seeds; those of genus Andropogon are known in its diet. It plucks seeds while clinging to stems and also feeds on the ground. It is typically in small flocks that include other seedeaters.

=== Breeding ===
Nothing is known about the plumbeous seedeater's breeding biology.

=== Vocalization ===
One description of the plumbeous seedeater's song is "very high warbling in short series including 2-3 repeated notes such as tjeutjeu, kuwerber, sisisi, or witje-witje". Another is "two whistles that sweep up in frequency (“sweet sweet”), followed by more complex and extended set of varied notes and trills, or juii–juii, jewluh-jehluh, dejewlp-dejewlp". It sometimes incorporates other species' vocalizations. Its calls are "a loud jep, a soft, falling, clear to raspy pewr or a nasal, rising pew’eet?".

== Status ==
The IUCN has assessed the plumbeous seedeater as being of Least Concern. It has a very large range; its population size is not known but is believed to be stable. No immediate threats have been identified. It is considered "fairly common" in Colombia, "uncommon and local" in Peru, and "frequent to uncommon" in Brazil.
