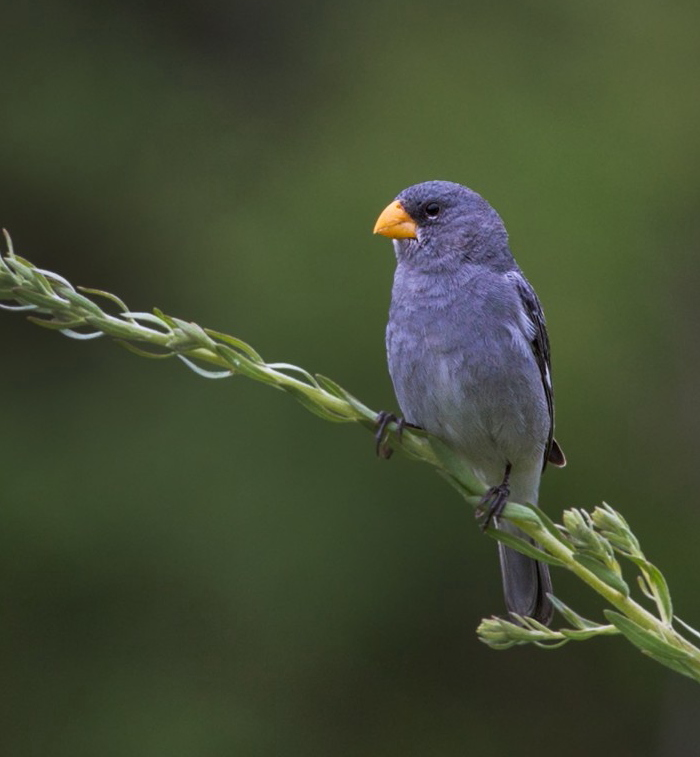
- A male Tropeiro seedeater at Lages, Santa Catarina state, Brazil
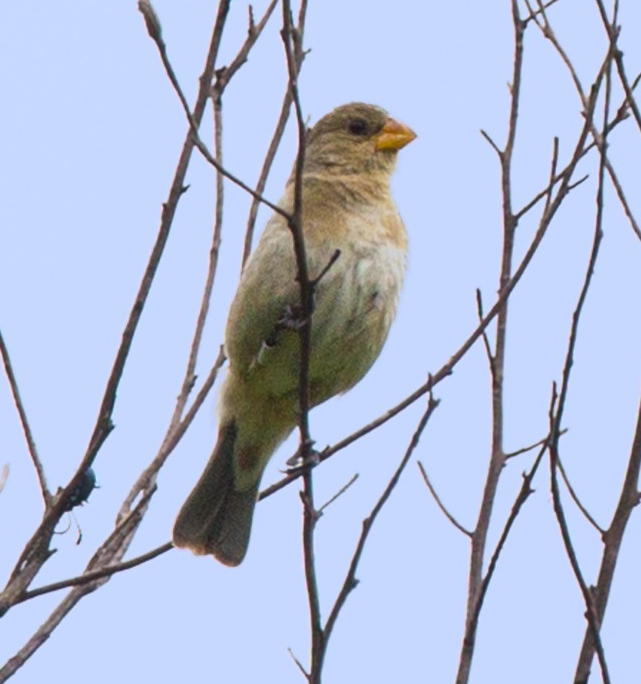
- Female

Conservation status
- Vulnerable (IUCN 3.1)

Scientific classification
- Kingdom: Animalia
- Phylum: Chordata
- Class: Aves
- Order: Passeriformes
- Family: Thraupidae
- Genus: Sporophila
- Species: S. beltoni

Binomial name
- Sporophila beltoni Repenning & Fontana, 2013

= Tropeiro seedeater =

Species of bird

The Tropeiro seedeater (Sporophila beltoni) is a Vulnerable species of bird in the family Thraupidae, the tanagers and allies. It is endemic to Brazil.

== Taxonomy and systematics ==
What is now the Tropeiro seedeater was long thought to be a color morph of the plumbeous seedeater (S. plumbea). It was recognized as different, but not as a subspecies, as early as 1938. The Tropeiro seedeater was recognized as a full species in 2013.

The species' English name alludes to the species' breeding range and migration pattern, which is similar to the historic Rota dos Tropeiros, the drovers' road used to drive livestock to markets in southeastern Brazil from the early 18th century to 1930. Its specific epithet beltoni honors American ornithologist William Belton, who made extensive studies of the vocalizations of the birds of Rio Grande do Sul, Brazil.

== Description ==
The Tropeiro seedeater averages 11.8 cm (4.6 in) ± 1.95 cm (0.77 in) long. It weighs an average of 11.8 g (0.42 oz) ± 1.01 g (0.036 oz). It has a thick bill with a rounded culmen. The species is sexually dimorphic. Adult males have a lead-gray head with a pale arc under the eye and some faint darker streaks on the crown. Their upperparts are lead-gray with a bluish cast on the mantle and scapulars, and with faint darker streaks except on the rump. Their tail is blackish with very thin grayish olive edges and buffy tips on the feathers. Their wings' upper sides are blackish with olive-gray edges on the coverts, olive-brown edges on the tertials, and white bases on the primaries that show as a small square on the closed wing. Their chin and lower cheek are at most very slightly whitish, their throat and breast a medium gray with a bluish cast, and their belly and undertail coverts whitish. Their wings' undersides are gray with white marginal coverts. Adult females have a brownish olive to olive-green head, upperparts, tail, and wings without the male's white primaries. Their chin, throat, belly, and vent are whitish and their breast and flanks drab gray with a buffy brown wash. Both sexes have a dark iris and lead-gray to black legs. Males have a bright yellow bill and females a brown maxilla and a paler yellowish mandible. Juveniles resemble adult females but usually have a black bill.

Male Tropeiro seedeaters are larger and heavier than plumbeous seedeaters. They also have a larger bill that is yellow instead of black, bluish gray rather than pure lead-gray upperparts, and darker gray underparts. Females are more olive above and grayer below than plumbeous females.

== Distribution and habitat ==
The Tropeiro seedeater is found in southeastern Brazil from far northeastern Rio Grande do Sul north to northeastern Goiás, northwestern Minas Gerais, and far southwestern Bahia. It breeds in a relatively narrow strip between Rio Grande do Sul and northeastern Paraná, overwinters in Goiás, Minas Gerais, and Bahia, and migrates between the two. The "borders" between breeding area and the migratory path and between the migratory path and the wintering area are not sharp lines.

The Tropeiro seedeater "is highly specific in habitat use, breeding in grasslands with dense tall shrubs associated with Araucaria angustifolia forests". It nests on steep hillsides in a narrow elevational range between 650 and 950 m (2,100 and 3,100 ft) above sea level. Its distribution in the breeding zone "is very fragmented, in accordance with the patchy nature of its habitat". The plumbeous seedeater breeds at higher elevations in flatter landscapes that have shorter and more widely spaced shrubs. The Tropeiro seedeater winters in cerrado savanna and similar landscapes with tall grass.

== Behavior ==
=== Movement ===
The Tropeiro seedeater is a complete migrant; its breeding, migration, and winter ranges are described above. It breeds between October and February and apparently begins migration over a fairly short period. Most have arrived on the wintering grounds by July and most leave southbound by the end of September.

=== Feeding ===
The Tropeiro seedeater's diet and feeding behavior have not been studied. It has been seen feeding on the seeds of purple speargrass (Piptochaetium stipoides) while clinging to the stems.

Tropeiro seedeater nest

=== Breeding ===
The Tropeiro seedeater breeds between early November and early March, though most breeding is between mid-November and late December. Second or third nesting attempts following a failed one continue into January and February. The clutch is one to three eggs though usually two. The female alone incubates, for 11 to 13 days (usually 12), and fledging occurs eight to 11 days after hatch. Both parents provision nestlings. The Tropeiro and plumbeous seedeaters have a small overlap in their breeding ranges but there is little gene flow between them due to their different habitat requirements.

=== Vocalization ===
The Tropeiro seedeater's song is similar to that of the plumbeous seedeater [which see here], "but with clear (whistled) introductory syllables and unique call notes". Its typical song is "a sweet, relatively weaker warble (lower range or volume)...and dominated by buzzing notes".

== Status ==
The IUCN has assessed the Tropeiro seedeater as Vulnerable. It has a limited range and its estimated population of 9000 mature individuals is believed to be decreasing. "The Tropeiro Seedeater (Sporophila beltoni) is the rarest of 35 species of Neotropical seedeaters. [It] has a restricted and highly fragmented distribution and has experienced declines in its population and historical distribution because of habitat loss and pressure from bird trappers."

== See also ==
- Tropeiro
