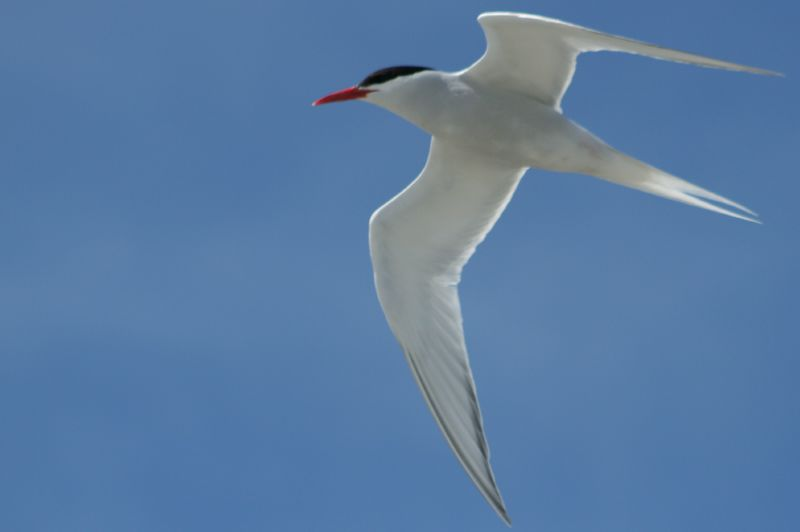

Conservation status
- Least Concern (IUCN 3.1)

Scientific classification
- Kingdom: Animalia
- Phylum: Chordata
- Class: Aves
- Order: Charadriiformes
- Family: Laridae
- Genus: Sterna
- Species: S. hirundinacea

Binomial name
- Sterna hirundinacea Lesson, 1831

= South American tern =

Species of bird

The South American tern (Sterna hirundinacea) is a species of tern found in coastal regions of southern South America, including the Falkland Islands, ranging north to Peru (Pacific coast) and Brazil (Atlantic coast). It is generally the most common tern in its range. The smaller, highly migratory common tern closely resembles it. The specific epithet refers to the "swallow-like" forked tail feathering.

== Description ==
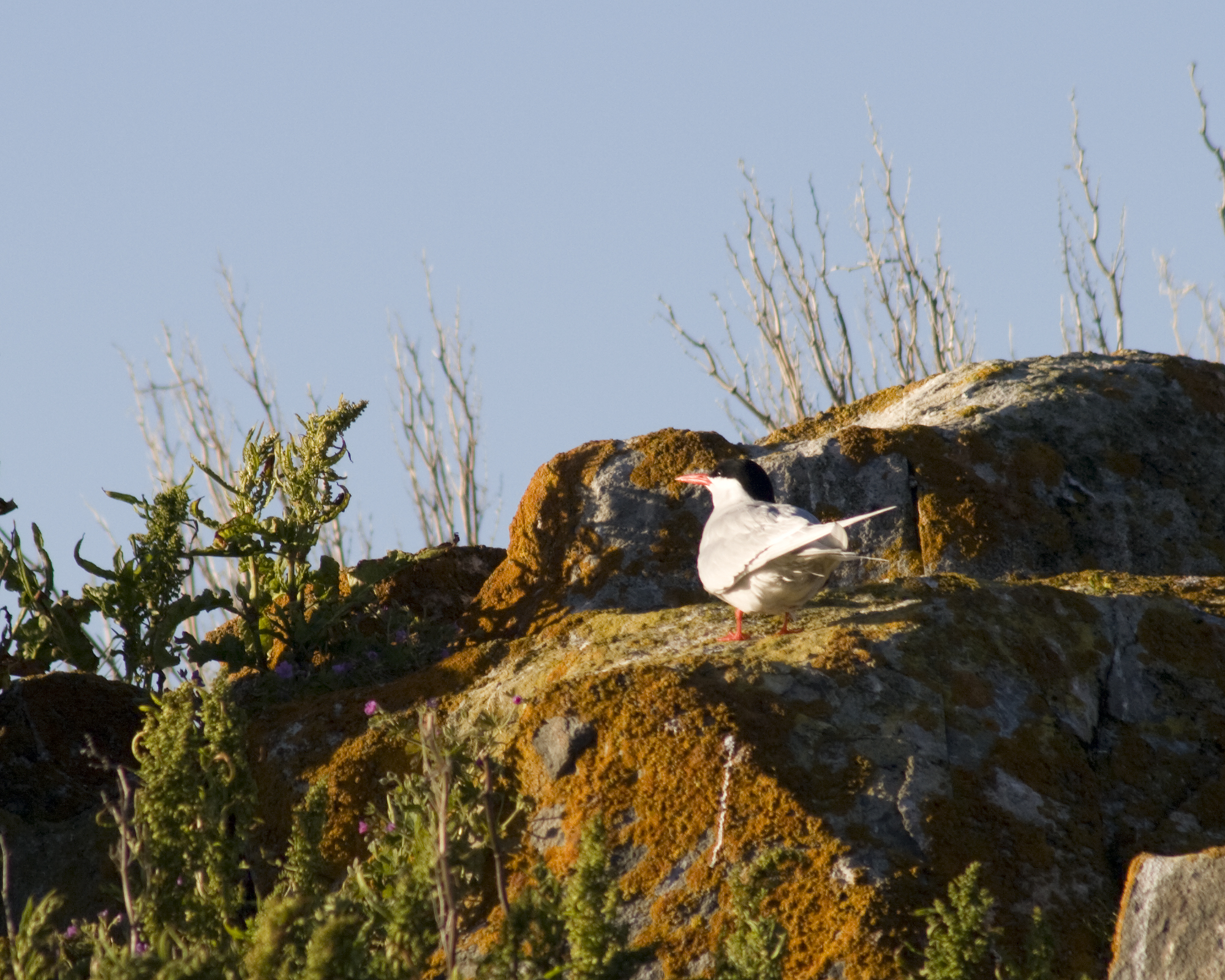

With adult South American terns reaching a length of 40 to 44 centimetres (16 to 17 in), they are larger than either common terns (Sterna hirundo) or Arctic terns (Sterna paradisaea). Otherwise they closely resemble these species in plumage at all times of year. The beak is larger and is red in adults, and they do not have a dark-coloured bar on the carpus of the wing. The black cap extends below the eye, usually separated from it by a white crescent, and the rear edge of the cap is neatly defined. Juveniles have boldly-barred, dusky, upper parts, and retain their barred tertials into their immature plumage, which differentiates them from common and Arctic tern immatures.

== Distribution ==
This tern is found around the coasts of the southern half of South America. Its breeding range extends on the Atlantic coast from east central Brazil southwards through Argentina and the Falkland Islands to Tierra del Fuego. On the Pacific coast it breeds in southern Peru and Chile. In the winter, birds from the southern end of the range migrate northwards to Ecuador, Uruguay and Southern Brazil.

== Behaviour ==
The South American tern feeds on fish, crustaceans and other small invertebrates. It nests on islands, beaches and cliff tops, and when not breeding may be seen offshore, in estuaries and harbours.

An 1877 account described a breeding colony found on a beach in Chubut Province in Argentina. A very large number of birds were nesting in an area about 130 square metres (150 sq yd). The nests were mere scrapes in the gravel and shingle, each containing one, two or three eggs. These were smaller than the eggs of the Sandwich tern but resembled them in general appearance, though every one was differently marked. It was difficult walking between the nests without crushing eggs, and it was estimated that there might be 135,000 nesting birds, with 67,500 nests containing 112,500 eggs.
