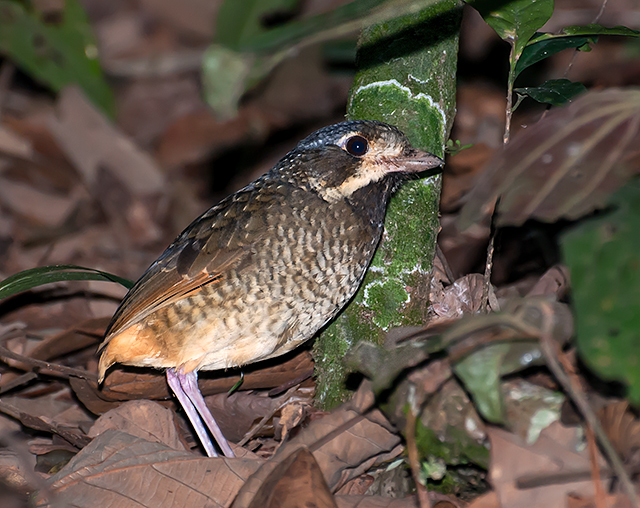

Conservation status
- Least Concern (IUCN 3.1)

Scientific classification
- Kingdom: Animalia
- Phylum: Chordata
- Class: Aves
- Order: Passeriformes
- Family: Grallariidae
- Genus: Grallaria
- Species: G. varia

Binomial name
- Grallaria varia (Boddaert, 1783)

= Variegated antpitta =

Species of bird

The variegated antpitta (Grallaria varia) is a species of bird in the family Grallariidae. It is found in Argentina, Brazil, Colombia, the Guianas, Paraguay, Peru, and Venezuela.

== Taxonomy and systematics ==
The variegated antpitta was described by the French polymath Georges-Louis Leclerc, Comte de Buffon in 1780 in his Histoire Naturelle des Oiseaux from a specimen collected in Cayenne, French Guiana. The bird was also illustrated in a hand-colored plate engraved by François-Nicolas Martinet in the Planches Enluminées D'Histoire Naturelle which was produced under the supervision of Edme-Louis Daubenton to accompany Buffon's text. Neither the plate caption nor Buffon's description included a scientific name but in 1783 the Dutch naturalist Pieter Boddaert coined the binomial name Formicarius varius in his catalogue of the Planches Enluminées. The variegated antpitta is now placed in the genus Grallaria that was introduced by the French ornithologist Louis Pierre Vieillot in 1816. The genus name is from Neo-Latin grallarius meaning "stilt-walker". The specific epithet varia is from Latin varius meaning "various", "diverse" or "variegated".

The variegated antpitta has these five subspecies:

- G. v. cinereiceps Hellmayr, 1903
- G. v. varia (Boddaert, 1783)
- G. v. distincta Todd, 1927
- G. v. intercedens von Berlepsch & Leverkühn, 1890
- G. v. imperator Lafresnaye, 1842

== Description ==
Grallaria antpittas are a "wonderful group of plump and round antbirds whose feathers are often fluffed up...they have stout bills [and] very short tails". The variegated antpitta is the largest member of its genus that occurs in the lowlands; it is 16 to 20.5 cm (6.3 to 8.1 in) long and weighs 90 to 135 g (3.2 to 4.8 oz). The sexes have the same plumage. Adults of the nominate subspecies G. v. varia have a dark olive forecrown; they have a slate gray crown and nape whose feathers have black tips and pale shafts. They have white or buffy lores that extend down into a "moustache", dark rufescent olive ear coverts with thin buff streaks, and dull blue gray skin around their eye. Their upperparts and tail are mostly olive brown with black scaling on much of their back. Their wings are mostly brown to rufescent brown with narrow buff or tawny streaks on the wing coverts. Their throat is dark rufescent olive, their breast brown with a small white or pale buff patch in the center, their belly pale buff or ochraceous, their flanks spotted and streaked black and dusky brown, and their crissum tawny-buff. All subspecies have a dark brown iris, a dark gray maxilla, a gray mandible with a pale base, and grayish legs and feet.

The other subspecies of the variegated antpitta differ from the nominate and each other thus:

- G. v. cinereiceps: buffier lores and heavier scaling on the back than the nominate; bright ochraceous or cinnamon base color on underparts
- G. v. distincta: more obvious pale streaks on the back, generally duller and less rufescent underparts, and brighter more ochraceous undertail coverts than the nominate
- G. v. imperator: largest subspecies; olive tinge to crown with obvious pale streaks, small triangular buff spots on back feathers, larger buffy spots on wing coverts and darker throat than nominate, lightly barred olive buff lower breast and upper belly, pale buff lower belly with little or no barring or scaling
- G. v. intercedens: similar to imperator but paler overall and with some bars on the lower belly and undertail coverts

== Distribution and habitat ==
The variegated antpitta has a significantly disjunct distribution. The subspecies are found thus:

- G. v. cinereiceps: zone where southern Venezuela's Amazonas state and northwestern Brazil's Amazonas state meet, and separately in northeastern Peru's Department of Loreto (and see below)
- G. v. varia: northern Brazil and the Guianas north of the Amazon and east of the lower Negro River
- G. v. distincta: Brazil south of the Amazon between the Madeira and Tapajós rivers and south into Rondônia and northern Mato Grosso
- G. v. intercedens: eastern Brazil from southern Bahia south at least to northeastern Minas Gerais and Espírito Santo; historical records in Pernambuco
- G. v. imperator: from southern Minas Gerais and Rio de Janeiro (state) south to central Rio Grande do Sul in Brazil and through eastern Paraguay into northeastern Argentina's Misiones Province

The South American Classification Committee of the American Ornithological Society has documented records in Colombia, apparently of subspecies G. v. cinereiceps.

The variegated antpitta generally inhabits the floor of humid primary forest and mature secondary forest. In the Amazon Basin it favors terra firme and floodplain forest. In elevation it reaches about 650 m (2,100 ft) in Amazonian Brazil and Venezuela, and 1,400 m (4,600 ft) in southeastern Brazil.

== Behavior ==
=== Movement ===
The variegated antpitta is believed to be a year-round resident throughout its range.

=== Feeding ===
The variegated antpitta's diet is not known in detail but appears to be primarily arthropods and to include other invertebrates such as earthworms. It is highly terrestrial while foraging; it hops, pauses, and dashes to capture prey, sometimes flicking aside leaf litter to expose it. They seldom fly beyond a short distance or higher than to a low branch. They mostly hunt at dawn and dusk. They occasionally attend army ant swarms to capture prey disturbed by the ants.

=== Breeding ===
The variegated antpitta's breeding season appears to span at least October to December in most areas though nestlings have been found in June in Amazonian Brazil. The nest is a large untidy cup made of various plant materials placed on a downed log, atop a stump, on in a crevice in a tree trunk. The usual clutch size appears to be two eggs. Both adults construct the nest, incubate the eggs, and brood and provision nestlings.

=== Vocalization ===
The song of the G. v. imperator variegated antpitta consists of a series of 11–14 notes, beginning with four to six long notes, increasing in volume, then rising slightly in pitch and pace to a series of six to eight loud, shorter notes, with the last note weaker. The nominate subspecies is similar but steady in pitch, containing only eight notes, with the first four drawn out and without the weaker final note. A Brazilian field guide alternatively describes the song as a three-part series of low-pitched, mournful notes, with the middle four to six pitched one note higher and slightly faster than first six and last two.

== Status ==
The IUCN has assessed the variegated antpitta as being of Least Concern. It has a very large range; its population size is not known and is believed to be decreasing. No immediate threats have been identified. It is considered uncommon to rare across its range.

IUCN expects that the species will lose 13-14 per cent of suitable habitat within its distribution over three generations (11 years) so that, given the sensitive nature of understory insectivores to fragmentation, the predicted anthropogenic disturbances are likely to reduce its population.
