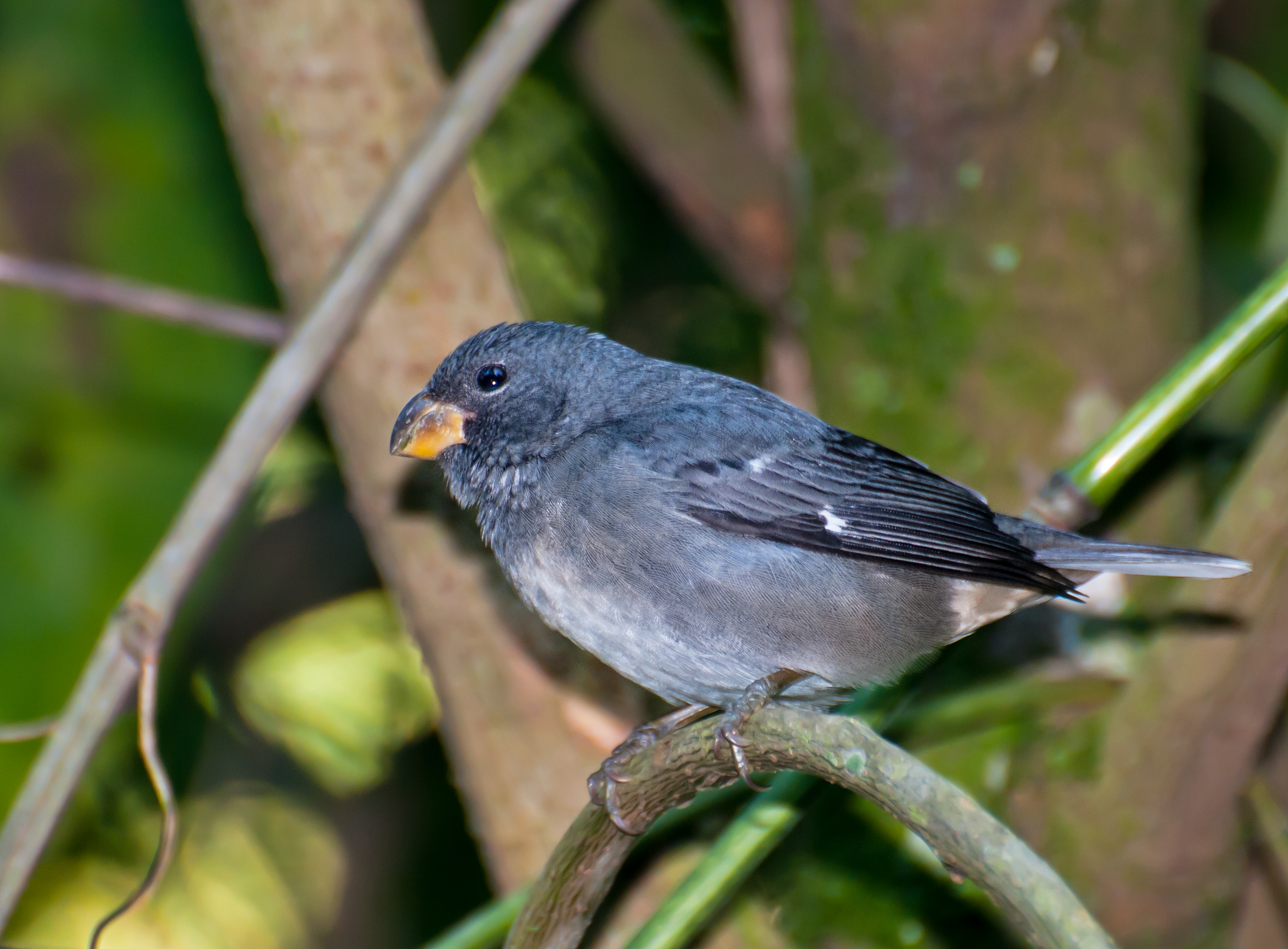
- A male Temminck's seedeater at Horto Florestal, São Paulo, Brazil
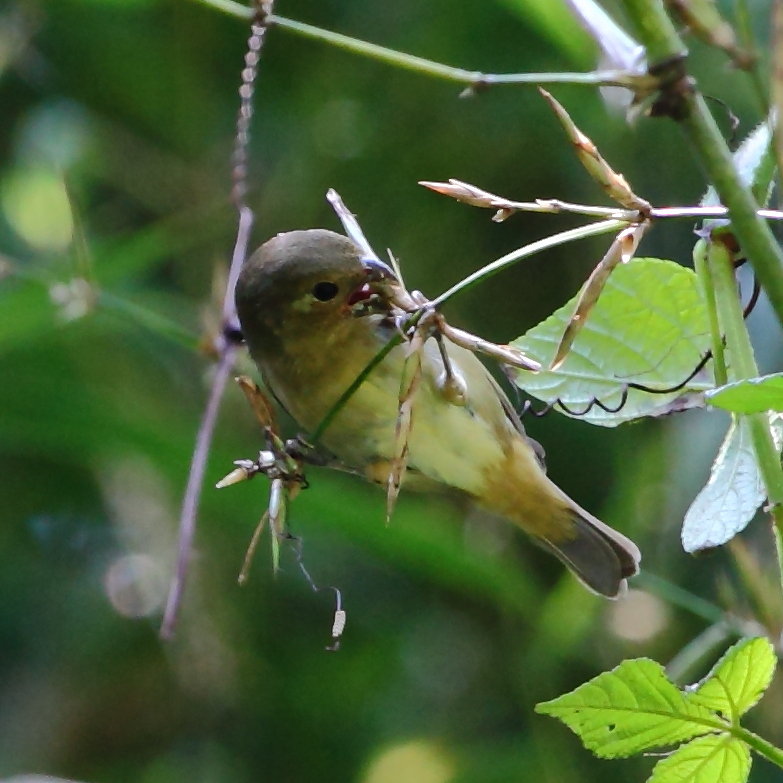
- A female Temminck's seedeater at Intervales State Park, São Paulo State, Brazil

Conservation status
- Vulnerable (IUCN 3.1)

Scientific classification
- Kingdom: Animalia
- Phylum: Chordata
- Class: Aves
- Order: Passeriformes
- Family: Thraupidae
- Genus: Sporophila
- Species: S. falcirostris

Binomial name
- Sporophila falcirostris (Temminck, 1820)

Synonyms
- Pyrrhula falcirostris (protonym)

= Temminck's seedeater =

Species of bird

Temminck's seedeater (Sporophila falcirostris) is a Vulnerable species of bird in the family Thraupidae, the tanagers and allies. It is found Argentina, Brazil, and Paraguay.

== Taxonomy and systematics ==
Temminck's seedeater has a somewhat complicated taxonomic history. It was formally described in 1820 with the binomial Pyrrhula falcirostris. The genus Pyrrhula is in the family Fringillidae. By 1938 Temminck's seedeater had been reassigned to its present genus Sporophila, a genus in the family Emberizidae. Based on studies published between 1988 and 2011, beginning in 2012 Sporophila was moved to the tanager family Thraupidae.

The species' English name commemorates the Dutch naturalist Coenraad Jacob Temminck, who wrote the formal description.

Temminck's seedeater is monotypic.

== Description ==
Temminck's seedeater is about 11 cm (4.3 in) long. Its bill has a thin maxilla that hooks over the end of the mandible, (Note: The specific epithet falcirostris means "sickle-beaked".) which is twice its width, and has a bend in the culmen. The species is sexually dimorphic. Adult males have a gray head, upperparts, and tail. Their wings are mostly gray with white bases on the primaries that show as a patch on the closed wing. Their throat and breast are a similar gray to the upperparts, their belly a paler gray, and their undertail coverts almost whitish. Adult females have an olive-brown head, upperparts, tail, and wings, without white on the primaries. Their throat and underparts are mostly a paler olive-brown than the upperparts with a whitish throat and center of the belly. Both sexes have a dark iris and brownish to dark gray legs. Males have a yellow bill; females have a horn-colored maxilla and a yellower mandible. Juveniles resemble adult females.

== Distribution and habitat ==
Temminck's seedeater has a disjunct distribution. Its largest population is found on Brazil's southeastern coastal area from Espirito Santo and eastern Minas Gerais south approximately to the border between São Paulo state and Paraná. A smaller population is north of there in eastern Bahia. Another small population is in extreme western Paraná, far eastern Paraguay, and northeastern Argentina's Misiones Province.

Temminck's seedeater is a bird of the Atlantic Forest. It inhabits secondary woodlands and the edges of denser forest. It is mostly in areas with Guadua and Chusquea bamboo but is also found in patches of Hypolytrum sedge. In elevation it ranges from sea level to 1,200 m (3,900 ft).

== Behavior ==
=== Movement ===
Though Temminck's seedeater is not migratory, it is highly nomadic, wandering to find areas with seeding bamboo and disappearing when the seeding event is over.

=== Feeding ===
Temminck's seedeater feeds primarily on the seeds of Guadua bamboo, in lesser amounts those of Chusquea bamboo and sedges, and occasionally on insects. It feeds on seeds while perched in the vegetation. It takes some insects in mid-air. It usually forages in wandering flocks.

=== Breeding ===
The breeding season of Temminck's seedeater includes July and August in Argentina and Paraguay but is otherwise unknown. One nest was a cup made from moss in a Sorocea ilicifolia tree; the female alone constructed it. Nothing else is known about the species' breeding biology.

=== Vocalization ===
The songs of Temminck's seedeater are somewhat variable. They "can be melodious, but ends with dominating high buzzy trill with electrical tone of a cicada (Cicadidae) stridulation, ztztztztzt-zt-tzi or tsi, si, si, si...tsirrrrrr". Another variant is written "tstststststststst ti ti" and others are "slower and more sibilant". Its calls include a "high-pitched descending tziiip, softer tslit and eet, and disyllabic ee-eet".

== Status ==
The IUCN originally in 1988 assessed Temminck's seedeater as Threatened, then in 1994 as Endangered, and since 2000 as Vulnerable. It has a limited range and its estimated population of between 2500 and 10,000 mature individuals is believed to be decreasing. "Rapid and continuing forest clearance has extended the intervals between major bamboo flowerings and nestings, and its nomadic habits suggest that existing reserves may afford inadequate protection. It is relatively scarce in trade, but this is almost certainly a reflection of its rarity rather than a lack of demand." It is considered "uncommon to rare" in Brazil.
