= 2001 in birding and ornithology =

- Years in birding and ornithology: 1998 1999 2000 2001 2002 2003 2004
- Centuries: 20th century · 21st century · 22nd century
- Decades: 1970s 1980s 1990s 2000s 2010s 2020s 2030s
- Years: 1998 1999 2000 2001 2002 2003 2004

See also 2000 in birding and ornithology, main events of 2001, other specialist lists of events in 2001 and 2002 in birding and ornithology.

== Worldwide ==
=== New species ===
See also Bird species new to science described in the 2000s

- The Bukidnon woodcock from the Philippines is described as new to science in the journal Forktail

To be completed

=== Taxonomic developments ===
To be completed

== Europe ==
=== Britain ===
==== Breeding birds ====
To be completed

==== Migrant and wintering birds ====
- Record-breaking numbers of rose-coloured starling reach Britain.

==== Rare birds ====
- Britain's first red-billed tropicbird is photographed at sea off the Isles of Scilly in June.
- A grey catbird on Anglesey in October is the first for Britain.
- Britain's first snowy egret is found in Argyll in November, and remains in southwestern Scotland, touring a variety of locations, throughout much of 2002
- A green heron (Britain's fourth) is found in Lincolnshire in September

==== Other Events ====
- The British Birdwatching Fair has eastern Cuba as its theme for the year.

=== Scandinavia ===
To be completed

== North America ==
To be completed

== Asia ==
=== Japan ===
- In late August, a juvenile Calidris sandpiper is found in Japan which appears to be of the hybrid form known as Cox's sandpiper, only the second time this plumage has been recorded
