= 2000 in birding and ornithology =

- Years in birding and ornithology: 1997 1998 1999 2000 2001 2002 2003
- Centuries: 20th century · 21st century · 22nd century
- Decades: 1970s 1980s 1990s 2000s 2010s 2020s 2030s
- Years: 1997 1998 1999 2000 2001 2002 2003

== Worldwide ==
=== New species ===
See also Bird species new to science described in the 2000s

- Foothill elaenia Myiopagis olallai from Ecuador and Peru is described as new to science in The Wilson Bulletin
- Caatinga antwren Herpsilochmus sellowi from Brazil is described as new to science in the American journal The Auk
- Taiwan bush-warbler Bradypterus alishanensis is described as new to science in the American journal The Auk
- Scarlet-banded barbet Capito wallacei is described as new to science.

=== Rediscoveries ===
- Four pairs of Chinese crested terns are found breeding on the Matsu Islands, the first sighting anywhere in the world since 1991.

=== Taxonomic developments ===
To be completed

=== Ornithologists ===
==== Deaths ====
- 12 April - Ronald Lockley (born 1903)

== Europe ==
=== Britain ===
==== Breeding birds ====
To be completed

==== Migrant and wintering birds ====
- Several hundred European honey buzzards pass through during the autumn.

==== Rare birds ====
- Two zitting cisticolas in Dorset are the third and fourth for Britain.
- A Swinhoe's storm petrel near Aberdeen in July is the first for Scotland and eighth for Britain.
- Britain's first Siberian blue robin is seen in Suffolk during October.
- Britain's first long-tailed shrike is found in the Outer Hebrides in November.

==== Other events ====
- The British Birdwatching Fair has albatrosses as its theme for the year.

=== Ireland ===
- A blue-winged warbler at Cape Clear in October is the first record for Europe.

=== Scandinavia ===
To be completed

== North America ==
To be completed

== Asia ==
To be completed
