= 1997 in birding and ornithology =

- Years in birding and ornithology: 1994 1995 1996 1997 1998 1999 2000
- Centuries: 19th century · 20th century · 21st century
- Decades: 1960s 1970s 1980s 1990s 2000s 2010s 2020s
- Years: 1994 1995 1996 1997 1998 1999 2000

See also 1996 in birding and ornithology, main events of 1997 and 1998 in birding and ornithology

== Worldwide ==
=== New species ===
See also Bird species new to science described in the 1990s

- The jocotoco antpitta (Grallaria ridgelyi) from Ecuador was discovered in the Cerro Tapichalaca cloud forest.

=== Taxonomic developments ===
To be completed

== Europe ==
=== Britain ===
==== Breeding birds ====
- Only eleven booming bitterns are heard, half as many as the previous year.
- Thousands of young black-legged kittiwakes and other seabirds die in north-east England during storms.
- A pair of red-backed shrikes breed in Northern Scotland.

==== Migrant and wintering birds ====
To be completed

==== Rare birds ====
- A spectacled warbler at Landguard Point, Suffolk is the second British record
- A semipalmated plover at Dawlish Warren National Nature Reserve in June is the second British record
- A male Siberian rubythroat in Dorset in October is the second British record
- A blue-cheeked bee-eater in Shetland in June and July is Britain's eighth, but only the second to be seen by large numbers of observers.
- A western sandpiper in Lothian in July is also Britain's eighth, but only the first to be seen by large numbers of observers.
- A record influx of sixteen desert wheatears occurs between October and December

==== Other events ====
- The British Birdwatching Fair has Ecuador as its theme for the year.

=== Scandinavia ===
To be completed

== North America ==
To be completed

== Asia ==
To be completed
