= 1996 in birding and ornithology =

- Years in birding and ornithology: 1993 1994 1995 1996 1997 1998 1999
- Centuries: 19th century · 20th century · 21st century
- Decades: 1960s 1970s 1980s 1990s 2000s 2010s 2020s
- Years: 1993 1994 1995 1996 1997 1998 1999

See also 1995 in birding and ornithology, main events of 1996 and 1997 in birding and ornithology

== Worldwide ==
- 41 Northern bald ibises, a fifth of the known world population, die in Morocco of unknown causes.

=== New species ===
See also Bird species new to science described in the 1990s

- The cryptic warbler (Cryptosylvicola randrianasoloi) from Madagascar is first described.

=== Taxonomic developments ===
To be completed

=== Ornithologists ===
==== Deaths ====
- 21 May - Bobby Tulloch (born 1929)

== Europe ==
=== Britain ===
==== Breeding birds ====
- The only breeding pair of golden eagles in England hatch a chick for the first time in three years at Haweswater.
- 580 singing male corncrakes are counted, up from 537 in 1995.
- The first inland breeding of avocets in modern times takes place at a site in London. However breeding success at coastal colonies in East Anglia is poor.
- A pair of hoopoes successfully breed in Mid Wales.

==== Migrant and wintering birds ====
- Thousands of waxwings are seen across Britain in the first few months of the year.
- Large numbers of little stints and curlew sandpipers pass through during the autumn.

==== Rare birds ====
- A second-calendar year south polar skua (Stercorarius maccormicki) was at West Bexington, Dorset from 27 January to 4 February 1996. The species nests on the Antarctic continent, and during the non-breeding season covers large distances, including as far as the northern oceans. It was added to the British list in August 2021.
- A redhead in Nottinghamshire in March is Britain's first
- An American coot at Stodmarsh, Kent in April is Britain's first
- An indigo bunting on Ramsey Island, Pembrokeshire in October is Britain's first
- A cedar waxwing in Nottingham in February is Britain's second, but the first to be seen by large numbers of observers
- A great knot on Teesside in October is Britain's second, but the first to be seen by large numbers of observers
- A Caspian plover in Shetland in June is Britain's fourth
- A calandra lark on the Isles of Scilly in April is Britain's fifth
- During October, the Isles of Scilly also hosted two black-and-white warblers and Britain's sixth buff-bellied pipit
- A Spanish sparrow arrives in Cumbria in July to begin a year-long stay; few observers had seen this species in Britain previously
- The influx of Arctic redpolls of the race exilipes which began in late 1995 continued, and became the largest recorded invasion of this species into the country

==== Other events ====
- Thousands of seabirds are killed by an oil spill when the Sea Empress oil tanker runs aground in Pembrokeshire in February.
- A trial cull of ruddy ducks takes place in the Midlands.
- At Rutland Water a project to reintroduce ospreys begins.
- The British Birdwatching Fair the Vietnamese pheasant as its theme.

=== France ===
- Europe's first great blue heron on Ile d'Ouessant, Finistère in April.

=== Ireland ===
- A long-toed stint at Ballycotton, County Cork in June is the first for Ireland.

=== Scandinavia ===
To be completed

== North America ==
To be completed

== Asia ==
- Four Siberian white cranes arrive at Bharatpur in India, the first records of this highly endangered species there since the 1992/1993 winter.
