= 2003 in birding and ornithology =

The year 2003 in birding and ornithology.

See also 2002 in birding and ornithology, main events of 2003, other specialist lists of events in 2003 and 2004 in birding and ornithology.

== Worldwide ==
=== New species ===
See also Bird species new to science described in the 2000s

- The Munchique wood-wren from the Colombian Andes is described as new to science in the online journal Ornitologica Colombiana
- The Okarito brown kiwi from South Island, New Zealand is described as new to science in the Records of the Auckland Museum

To be completed

=== Taxonomic developments ===
To be completed

=== Ornithologists ===
==== Deaths ====
- 12 January - Dean Amadon
- 16 January - Chris Mead
- 13 February - Stuart Keith
- 24 April - Guy Mountfort
- 26 April - Edward Max Nicholson
- 27 April - Mick Rogers
- 7 August - Roxie Collie Laybourne
- 15 September - Richard Liversidge
- 10 October - Frank Pitelka
- 17 November - Colin Harrison
- ? - Sakae Tamura
- ? - Stephen Marchant

== Europe ==
=== Britain ===
==== Breeding birds ====
To be completed

==== Migrant and wintering birds ====
- 130 chiffchaff overwintered at St Austell, 50 at Helston and 25 at Countess Weir. All the sites were "old fashioned" sewage works where the micro climate and lush vegetation ensure plenty of insects through the winter

==== Rare birds ====
- Taiga flycatcher was added to the British list, with a male at Flamborough Head, east Yorkshire in April, followed by a first-winter in Shetland in September.
- Britain's first Audouin's gull was found in May at Dungeness, Kent
- A male black lark at South Stack, Anglesey in June was initially thought to be Britain's first, and was seen by thousands of birders; it subsequently transpired that an earlier record, also a male, from Spurn, east Yorkshire in 1984 had just recently been accepted by the British Birds Rarities Committee, so making the South Stack bird Britain's second
- A female redhead on Barra, Outer Hebrides from September through until April 2004 was Britain's third (but the first female).
- Britain's third American coot occurred in Shetland in November and stayed into 2004.
- Britain's third lesser sand plover, a breeding-plumaged male of the race mongolus occurred at Keyhaven Marshes, Hampshire in July.
- Britain's fourth (and first spring) thick-billed warbler occurred on Fair Isle in May; the same island hosted Britain's fourth Siberian rubythroat and third Savannah sparrow simultaneously during October.
- A record influx of Hume's leaf warblers occurred in late autumn, consisting of over 20 birds.
- The first ever influx of Arctic redpolls of the Greenland race hornemanni occurred during the autumn.

==== Other events ====
- The British Birdwatching Fair has Madagascar's wetlands as its theme for the year.

=== Scandinavia ===
To be completed

== North America ==
- An unprecedented movement of American robins in eastern North America on 8–9 November. Over 500,000 were recorded passing over Cape May after a deep low pressure system swept migrants into the north east of the United States
