= 2004 in birding and ornithology =

The year 2004 in birding and ornithology.

== Worldwide ==
=== New species ===
See also Bird species new to science described in the 2000s

- The Togian hawk-owl from Indonesia is described as new to science in the Bulletin of the British Ornithologists' Club.
- The Rubeho akalat from Tanzania is described as new to science in the American journal The Auk.
- The Acre antshrike from Brazil is described as new to science in the American journal The Auk.
- The Calayan rail from the Philippines is discovered and described as new to science in the journal Forktail
- The Serendib scops-owl from the Sri Lankan rainforests is described as new to science in the Bulletin of the British Ornithologists' Club
- Mees's nightjar from Flores and Sumba, Indonesia is described as new to science in Zoologische Verhandelingen PDF.

To be completed

=== Rediscoveries ===
- The rusty-throated wren-babbler was rediscovered on 18 November in the Mishmi Hills of eastern Arunachal Pradesh; the species had only previously been known from the type specimen, collected c.50 km away in 1947
- The ivory-billed woodpecker is reported as having been discovered in Arkansas in April, although the reports attract considerable controversy.

To be completed

=== Taxonomic developments ===
To be completed

=== Ornithologists ===
==== Deaths ====
- 7 August - Colin Bibby (born 1948)

== Europe ==
=== Britain ===
==== Breeding birds ====
- Osprey bred for the first time in Wales.

==== Migrant and wintering birds ====
To be completed

==== Rare birds ====
- A small influx of long-tailed tits of the white-headed northern race caudatus in the early part of the year gave many British birders their first opportunity to observe this subspecies in Britain.
- Britain's first chestnut-eared bunting and rufous-tailed robin were both found on Fair Isle in October.
- Britain's first purple martin was found on the Butt of Lewis, Outer Hebrides in September.
- Britain's first masked shrike, a juvenile, was found in October at Kilrenny Common in Fife, and seen by large numbers of birders.
- Britains's first Scopoli's shearwater off Isles of Scilly waters on 2 August.
- The third great knot for Britain was seen on the Wyre Estuary, Lancashire in August.
- A cream-coloured courser on the Isles of Scilly during September and October is the first in Britain for 20 years.

==== Other events ====
- The British Birdwatching Fair has northern Peru's dry forests as its theme for the year.
- The West Midland Bird Club celebrates its 75th anniversary.

=== Scandinavia ===
To be completed

== North America ==
To be completed
