= 1995 in birding and ornithology =

See also 1996 in birding and ornithology

== Worldwide ==
- In Brazil a female Spix's macaw is released into the wild in the hope that it will mate with the last remaining wild bird but disappears after seven weeks.

=== New species ===
See also Bird species new to science described in the 1990s

To be completed

=== Taxonomic developments ===
To be completed

== Europe ==
=== Britain ===
==== Breeding birds ====
- Yellow-legged gull breeds for the first time in Britain at a site in Southern England.

==== Migrant and wintering birds ====
- A large wreck of little auks occurs on North Sea coasts in November.

==== Rare birds ====
- A Rüppell's warbler near Aberdaron in Gwynedd is the first for Wales and fifth for Britain.
- A Ross's gull in Cleveland in June and an ivory gull at Inverness in July attract large numbers of birders.
- Westerly winds during October lead to an influx of North American landbirds
- A bay-breasted warbler at Land's End, Cornwall in October is the first British record
- A chestnut-sided warbler at Prawle Point, Devon in October is the second British record
- A record-breaking invasion of Arctic redpolls begins in November and continues into 1996.

==== Other events ====
- The British Birdwatching Fair has the wetlands of Morocco as its theme for the year.

=== Ireland ===
==== Rare birds ====
- Two yellow warblers in October, in County Clare and County Waterford are the first and second for Ireland

== Asia ==
- Three sightings of sooty shearwater in the United Arab Emirates are the first records there.
