= 2002 in birding and ornithology =

See also 2001 in birding and ornithology, main events of 2002, other specialist lists of events in 2002 and 2003 in birding and ornithology.

== Worldwide ==
=== New species ===
See also Bird species new to science described in the 2000s

To be completed

=== Taxonomic developments ===
To be completed

=== Other events ===
- eBird, a database for bird lists, photos, and sounds was created by Cornell University and the National Audubon Society. eBird has grown into a large, diverse citizen science project as eBird “provides a permanent repository for... observations and a method for keeping track of each user’s personal observations, birding effort, and various lists''
- The 2000 publication of the popular field guide The Sibley Guide to Birds reached 500,000 in sales copies.

== Europe ==
=== Britain ===
==== Breeding birds ====
- A pair of European bee-eaters nests at Bishop Middleham Quarry in County Durham, raising two young - see Bee-eaters in Britain

==== Migrant and wintering birds ====
To be completed

==== Rare birds ====
- The small influx of orange-billed Thalasseus terns occurred in England and Wales during the summer, involving at least two birds believed to be elegant terns.
- A male pallid harrier at Elmley, Kent in August is the first long-staying bird on the British mainland, and attracts thousands of visitors
- A lesser kestrel on the Isles of Scilly in May was the first to be seen by large numbers of observers
- A juvenile Allen's gallinule on the Isle of Portland, Dorset is the second British record; it died soon after being found
- A female lesser sand plover in Lincolnshire in May is Britain's second
- A rufous turtle dove on Orkney in November is the first to be seen by large numbers of observers
- A tree swallow on Unst, Shetland in May was Britain's second
- Two Sykes' warblers were seen, taking the British total to five
- A record influx of rose-coloured starlings occurred in June, involving some 128 individuals

==== Other events ====
- The British Birdwatching Fair has Sumatra's rainforests as its theme for the year.

=== Scandinavia ===
To be completed

== North America ==
=== New Species ===
- “ ‘Dark Rumped’ Petrel (Peterodrama Phaeopygia) is now recognized to consist of two species, Galapagos Petrel (P. Phaeopygia)”. It has been added to the checklist as a code 5 species.

=== United States ===
==== Rare Birds ====
- One Ross’s Goose (Chen Rosii) found in Irondequoit Bay State Marine Park in Irondequoit, New York on September 8, 2002
- The Black Brant (Branta Bernicla) was found in New Baltimore Greene county in New York on October 25, 2002

==== Other Events ====
- The Avian Management study for the state of Colorado by the U.S. Department of Agriculture was accomplished, which provided “trend information and baseline data for future comparison, monitoring, and evaluation”
- The first ever Mono Basin Bird Festival(Bird Chautauqua) was held in the Inyo National Forest. The festival was organized by the Audubon Society, the Mono Lakes Committee, the PBRO (Point Reyes Bird Observatory), and California State Parks
- The Oregon Breeding Bird Atlas Project was completed, which “inventories birds in several areas on the forest and which will be published in a book, Birds of Oregon: A General Reference”
- Nevada Breeding Bird Atlas was completed after being started in 1997 to systemically survey, document, and publish data.
- In the 102nd bird count, there were 38,287 field observers and 5.565 yard-bird observers for a total of 43,852 participants.
- The only known Spix's Macaw named Presley in the U.S., first discovered in Colorado, was returned to Brazil after being missing for 25 years.
- The American Birding Association created the Robert Ridgway Award for Publications in Field Ornithology.
- ABA (American Birding Association) Award Recipients from 2002.
  - ABA Roger Tory Peterson Award
    - David Sibley
  - ABA Chandler Robbins Award
    - Charles Duncan
  - ABA Ludlow Griscom Award
    - Rich Stallcup
  - ABA Claudia Wilds Award
    - Dan Williams
  - ABA Robert Ridgway Award
    - Harold Mayfield

=== Canada ===
==== Other Events ====
- In the 102nd bird count, there were 7,190 field observers and 4,026 feeder watcher for a total of 11,236 participants.

== Africa ==
=== Other Events ===
- BirdLife South Africa appointed a full-time person to manage the development of Zululand Birding Route. The Zululand Birding Route promotes avitourism and environmental conservation.

== Australasia ==
=== New Zealand ===
- A total of 24 kakapo chicks are fledged on Codfish Island / Whenua Hou, increasing the world population of this critically endangered species from 62 birds to 86, the biggest increase since the start of the Kakapo Recovery programme.
