= Sakae Tamura =

Sakae Tamura may refer to:

- Sakae Tamura (nature photographer), photographer of wildlife (insects, plants, birds, etc.) and magazine editor
- Sakae Tamura (photographer), photographer of portraits and writer about photographic techniques
