= Forktail (disambiguation) =

A forktail is a type of small bird found in Asia.

Forktail may also refer to:

- Green junglefowl, a species of bird in the pheasant family
- Forktail (journal), journal of the Oriental Bird Club
- Ischnura, a genus of damselfly
