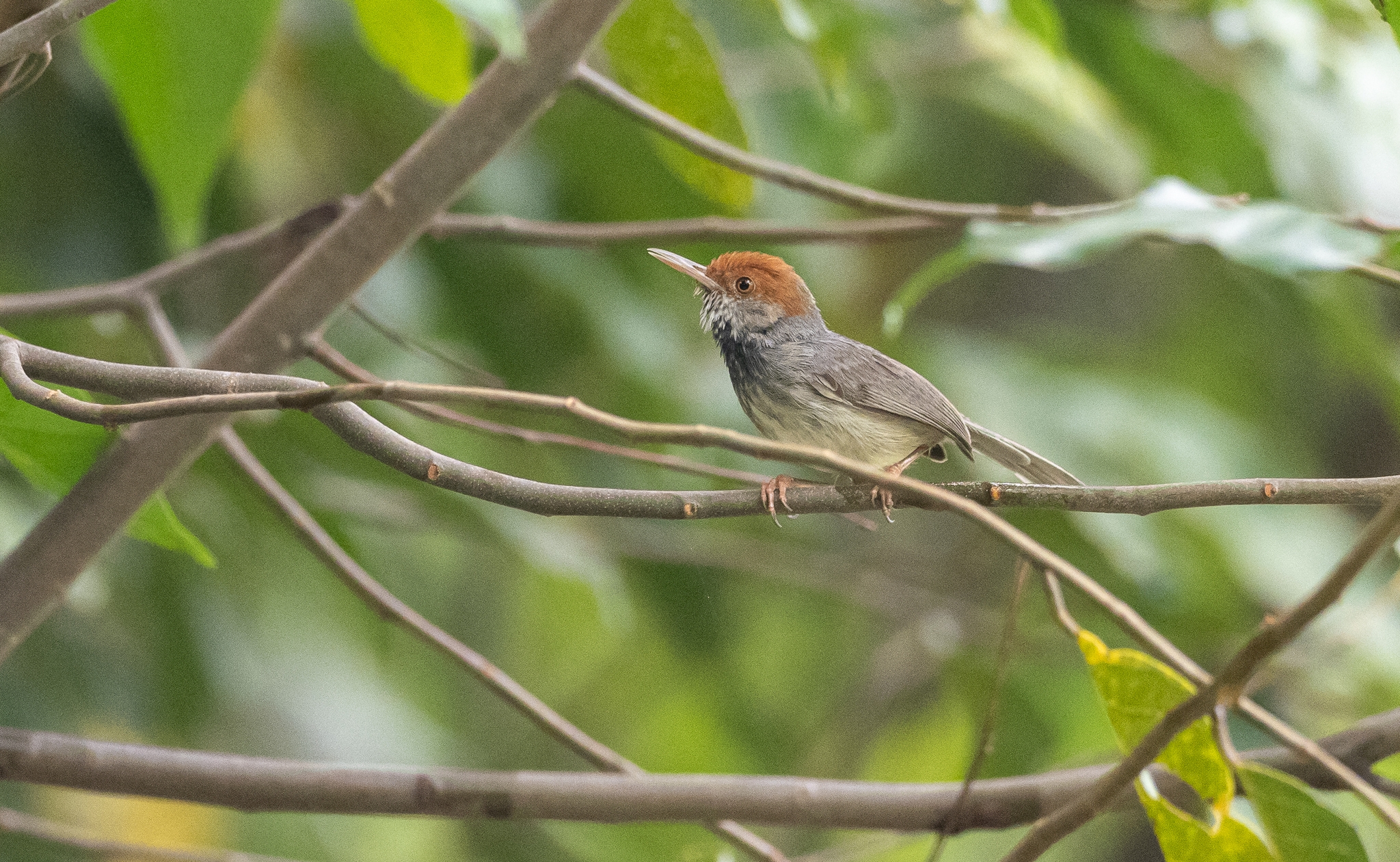

Conservation status
- Near Threatened (IUCN 3.1)

Scientific classification
- Kingdom: Animalia
- Phylum: Chordata
- Class: Aves
- Order: Passeriformes
- Family: Cisticolidae
- Genus: Orthotomus
- Species: O. chaktomuk

Binomial name
- Orthotomus chaktomuk Mahood et al., 2013

= Cambodian tailorbird =

Species of bird

The Cambodian tailorbird (Orthotomus chaktomuk) is a species of bird endemic to Cambodia, likely confined to a single dense shrub habitat in the floodplain of the Mekong river. It was first discovered and recorded by scientists in 2009 in Phnom Penh, the capital of Cambodia, during avian influenza checks. In 2013, it was determined to be a unique species and formally described. It is a very small bird, about 10 cm long, with an orange-red tuft on its head.

== Discovery ==
The Cambodian tailorbird was discovered in Phnom Penh, the capital of Cambodia, in 2009, during avian influenza checks. Since then, it has been spotted in various parts of Phnom Penh, including on a construction site where bird researcher Ashish John photographed it. His picture was later used to help describe the bird.

In June 2012, John began collaborating with the Wildlife Conservation Society, BirdLife International, the University of Kansas, Louisiana State University, and the Sam Veasna Centre to test the bird's plumage, genetics, and song. The tests determined that it was a unique species. The paper formally describing the Cambodian tailorbird was published in a special online early-view issue of the Oriental Bird Club's journal Forktail. Its specific name comes from a Khmer word which means four-faces, which describes where the bird is found: in the floodplain where the Bassac River, Mekong, and Tonlé Sap meet.

== Description ==
The Cambodian tailorbird has an orange-red crown, and a black throat. The rest of its body is light and dark gray. It is 11–12 cm (4.3–4.7 in) long and weighs between 6–8 g (0.21–0.28 oz). The Cambodian tailorbird is known for its "loud call", which is similar to that of the dark-necked tailorbird.

== Habitat ==
The Cambodian tailorbird lives in a small area of dense scrubland within the floodplain of the Mekong river. The dense shrub habitat allowed it to remain undetected for so long despite living on the outskirts of a major city. It is one of two bird species endemic to Cambodia, the other being the Cambodian laughingthrush.

The discoverers of the Cambodian tailorbird recommended that it be listed as "near threatened" on the International Union for Conservation of Nature's Red List. They said it was at risk because its habitat is declining as a result of increased urbanisation. Most newly discovered species are categorised as such.

== See also ==
- Bird species discoveries
