= List of North American vagrant birds in Britain =

Many species of North American birds have been recorded in Great Britain as vagrants. Most occur in autumn; southwest England attracts the greatest proportion, but northern and western Scotland comes a close second. Occasionally birds overwinter, and some species (e.g. Baltimore oriole) are more prone to this than others. Vagrancy also occurs in spring, and some species (e.g. white-throated sparrow and dark-eyed junco) do in fact have more records at this time than in autumn. Weather systems are thought to be the primary reason for the occurrence of birds in autumn; some birds seen in spring may simply be overshoots, although ship-assistance may also play a part.

== Species list ==
The following species have been recorded, and accepted as wild by the British Ornithologists' Union Records Committee:

Species	Binomial name	Date of first record	Location of first record	Number of records (2022)	Reference(s)	Photo of Vagrant in Britain
Cackling goose	Branta hutchinsii	November 1976	Plex Moss/Formby Moss, Lancashire	52		
Ross's goose	Anser rossii	December 1970	Plex Moss, Lancashire	1		
Blue-winged teal	Spatula discors	1858	Nithsdale, Dumfries & Galloway	Regular vagrant		
American wigeon	Mareca americana	3 January 1907	Benbecula, Outer Hebrides	Extremely regular vagrant		
American black duck	Anas rubripes	March 1967	Stoke, Kent	41		
Canvasback	Aythya valisineria	December 1996	Cliffe, Kent	7		
Redhead	Aythya americana	March 1996	Bleasby, Nottinghamshire	1		
Lesser scaup	Aythya affinis	March 1987	Chasewater, Staffordshire	Regular vagrant		
King eider	Somateria spectabilis	1832	Orkney	Regular vagrant		
Steller's eider	Polysticta stelleri	February 1830	Caister, Norfolk	15		
Harlequin duck	Histrionicus histrionicus	1862	Filey, North Yorkshire	20		
White-winged scoter	Melanitta deglandi	June 2011	Blackdog, Aberdeenshire	4		
Black scoter	Melanitta americana	December 1987	Gosford Bay, Lothian	14		
Bufflehead	Bucephala albeola	January 1920	Tresco, Isles of Scilly	17		
Barrow's goldeneye	Bucephala islandica	November 1979	Irvine, Ayrshire	3		
Hooded merganser	Lophodytes cucullatus	October 2000	North Uist, Outer Hebrides	12		
Common nighthawk	Chordeiles minor	1927	Tresco, Isles of Scilly	22		
Chimney swift	Chaetura pelagica	21 October 1982	Porthgwarra, Cornwall	20		
Yellow-billed cuckoo	Coccyzus americanus	ca. 1835	Cornwall	66		
Black-billed cuckoo	Coccyzus erythropthalmus	1932	Isles of Scilly	16		
Mourning dove	Zenaida macroura	November 1999	North Uist, Outer Hebrides	5		
Sora	Porzana carolina	October 1864	Newbury, Berkshire	20		
American coot	Fulica americana	April 1996	Stodmarsh, Kent	9		
Purple gallinule	Porphyrio martinica	November 1958	St Mary's, Isles of Scilly	3		
Sandhill crane	Antigone canadensis	April 1981	Fair Isle, Shetland	4		
Pied-billed grebe	Podilymbus podiceps	December 1963	Blagdon Lake, Avon	45		
Red-necked grebe (New World subspecies holbollii)	Podiceps grisegena holbollii	September 1925	Gruinard Bay, Wester Ross, Highland	1 (+ 1 in 2024)		
American golden plover	Pluvialis dominica	3 August 1883	Mouth of River Almond, Perth	Extremely regular vagrant		
Semipalmated plover	Charadrius semipalmatus	October 1978	St Agnes, Isles of Scilly	4		
Killdeer	Charadrius vociferus	April 1859	Christchurch, Dorset	59		
Upland sandpiper	Bartramia longicauda	October 1851	Compton Verney, Warwickshire	47		
Hudsonian whimbrel	Numenius hudsonicus	May 1955	Fair Isle, Shetland	10		
Eskimo curlew	Numenius borealis	September 1855	Cairn Mon Earn, Aberdeenshire	4 (last in 1887, species likely extinct)		
Hudsonian godwit	Limosa haemastica	September 1981	Blacktoft Sands, East Yorkshire	3		
Stilt sandpiper	Calidris himantopus	August 1954	Kilnsea, East Yorkshire	38		
Baird's sandpiper	Calidris bairdii	September 1911	St Kilda, Outer Hebrides	Regular vagrant		
Least sandpiper	Calidris minutilla	October 1853	Marazion, Cornwall	41		
Semipalmated sandpiper	Calidris pusilla	July 1953	Cley next the Sea, Norfolk	Regular vagrant		
Western sandpiper	Calidris mauri	August 1969	Tresco, Isles of Scilly	10		
Long-billed dowitcher	Limnodromus scolopaceus	October 1801	Devon	Regular vagrant		
Short-billed dowitcher	Limnodromus griseus	September 1999	Rosehearty, Aberdeenshire	4		
Wilson's snipe	Gallinago delicata	October 1998	St Mary's, Isles of Scilly	10		
Wilson's phalarope	Phalaropus tricolor	October 1954	Rosyth, Fife	Regular vagrant		
Spotted sandpiper	Actitis macularius	June 1924	Loe Bar, Cornwall	Regular vagrant		
Solitary sandpiper	Tringa solitaria	pre-1870	River Clyde, South Lanarkshire	37		
Greater yellowlegs	Tringa melanoleuca	September 1906	Tresco, Isles of Scilly	34		
Ivory gull	Pagophila eburnea	December 1822	Unst, Shetland	Regular vagrant		
Bonaparte's gull	Chroicocephalus philadelphia	April 1850	Loch Lomond, Clyde	Regular vagrant		
Ross's gull	Rhodostethia rosea	April 1936	between Whalsay and Out Skerries, Shetland	Regular vagrant		
Laughing gull	Leucophaeus atricilla	July 1923	Eastbourne, Sussex	Regular vagrant		
Franklin's gull	Leucophaeus pipixcan	February 1970	Farlington Marshes, Hampshire	80		
Glaucous-winged gull	Larus glaucescens	December 2006	Hempsted, Gloucestershire	3		
American herring gull	Larus smithsonianus	February 1994	Ashton's Flashes, Cheshire	33		
Royal tern	Thalasseus maximus	November 1979	Kenfig, Mid Glamorgan	1		
Cabot's tern	Thalasseus acuflavidus	November 1984	Aston Ingham, Herefordshire	1		
Elegant tern	Thalasseus elegans	May 2002	Dawlish Warren National Nature Reserve, Devon	4		
Least tern	Sternula antillarum	June 1983	Rye Harbour, Sussex	1 (Male which returned annually, through 1992)		
Aleutian tern	Onychoprion aleuticus	May 1979	Farne Islands, Northumberland	1		
Bridled tern	Onychoprion anaethetus	November 1931	Dungeness, Kent	25		
Sooty tern	Onychoprion fuscatus	October 1852	Burton-on-Trent, Staffordshire	23		
Forster's tern	Sterna forsteri	February 1980	Falmouth Bay, Cornwall	21		
Black tern (subspecies surinamensis)	Chlidonias niger surinamensis	October 1999	Axe Estuary, Avon/Somerset	6		
Ancient murrelet	Synthliboramphus antiquus	May 1990	Lundy, Devon	1 (Returned 1991, 1992)		
Tufted puffin	Fratercula cirrhata	September 2009	Oare Marshes, Kent	1		
Red-billed tropicbird	Phaethon aethereus	June 2001	off Isles of Scilly	5		
Pacific diver (Pacific loon)	Gavia pacifica	January 2007	Farnham, North Yorkshire	9		
Black-capped petrel	Pterodroma hasitata	March/April 1850	Swaffham, Norfolk	2		
Magnificent frigatebird	Fregata magnificens	November 2005	Whitchurch, Shropshire	2		
Red-footed booby	Sula sula	September 2016	St Leonards-on-Sea, Sussex	1		
Brown booby	Sula leucogaster	August 2019	Swalecliffe, Kent	1		
Double-crested cormorant	Nannopterum auritum	January 1989	Billingham, County Durham	1		
American bittern	Botaurus lentiginosus	1804	Puddletown, Dorset	39		
Least bittern	Botaurus exilis	October 2022	Loch of Spiggie, Shetland	1		
Green heron	Butorides virescens	October 1889	St Austell, Cornwall	8		
Great blue heron	Ardea herodias	December 2007	St Mary's, Isles of Scilly	2		
Snowy egret	Egretta thula	November 2001	Seil Island, Argyll	1		
Northern harrier	Circus hudsonius	October 1982	St Mary's, Isles of Scilly	10		
Northern hawk-owl (New World subspecies caparoch)	Surnia ulula caparoch	March 1830	off coast of Cornwall	1		
Snowy owl	Bubo scandiacus	1812	Unst, Shetland	Regular vagrant		
Belted kingfisher	Megaceryle alcyon	1908	Sladesbridge, Cornwall	4		
Yellow-bellied sapsucker	Sphyrapicus varius	26 September 1975	Isles of Scilly	1		
American kestrel	Falco sparverius	May 1976	Fair Isle	2		
Eastern phoebe	Sayornis phoebe	April 1987	Lundy, Devon	1		
Yellow-bellied flycatcher	Empidonax flaviventris	September 2020	Tiree, Argyll	1		
Acadian flycatcher	Empidonax virescens	September 2015	Dungeness, Kent	1		
Alder flycatcher	Empidonax alnorum	October 2008	Nanjizal, Cornwall	2		
Eastern kingbird	Tyrannus tyrannus	September 2016	Outer Hebrides	1		
Red-eyed vireo	Vireo olivaceus	October 1962	St Agnes, Isles of Scilly	Regular vagrant		
Philadelphia vireo	Vireo philadelphicus	October 1987	Tresco, Isles of Scilly	1		
Yellow-throated vireo	Vireo flavifrons	October 1987	Kenidjack Valley, Cornwall	1		
Cedar waxwing	Bombycilla cedrorum	25 June 1985	Isle of Noss, Shetland	7		
Purple martin	Progne subis	5 September 2004	Butt of Lewis, Outer Hebrides	1		
Cliff swallow	Petrochelidon pyrrhonota	10 October 1983	St Agnes, Isles of Scilly	12		
Tree swallow	Tachycineta bicolor	6 June 1990	Porth Hellick, St Mary's, Isles of Scilly	2		
Ruby-crowned kinglet	Corthylio calendula	November 2020	Barra, Outer Hebrides	1		
Red-breasted nuthatch	Sitta canadensis	October 1989	Holkham, Norfolk	1		
Grey catbird	Dumetella carolinensis	2001	Holy Island, Anglesey	1		
Northern mockingbird	Mimus polyglottos	1982	Saltash, Cornwall	2		
Brown thrasher	Toxostoma rufum	November 1966	Durlston Head, Dorset	1		
American robin	Turdus migratorius	27 October 1952	Lundy, Devon	28		
Varied thrush	Ixoreus naevius	14 November 1982	Nanquidno, Cornwall	1		
Veery	Catharus fuscescens	6 October 1970	Porthgwarra, Cornwall	11		
Grey-cheeked thrush	Catharus minimus	5 October 1953	Fair Isle, Shetland	66		
Swainson's thrush	Catharus ustulatus	14 October 1967	Skokholm Island, Wales	41		
Hermit thrush	Catharus guttatus	2 June 1975	Fair Isle, Shetland	12		
Wood thrush	Hylocichla mustelina	7 October 1987	St Agnes, Isles of Scilly	1		
American pipit (Buff-bellied pipit)	Anthus rubescens	1910	St Kilda, Outer Hebrides	45		
Evening grosbeak	Hesperiphona vespertina	26 March 1969	St Kilda, Outer Hebrides	2		
Pine grosbeak	Pinicola enucleator	before 1831	Pelaw, Durham	12		
Lark sparrow	Chondestes grammacus	June 1981	Landguard Common, Suffolk	2		
Dark-eyed junco	Junco hyemalis	May 1960	Dungeness, Kent	45		
White-crowned sparrow	Zonotrichia leucophrys	May 1977	Fair Isle, Shetland	9		
White-throated sparrow	Zonotrichia albicollis	January 1893	Hull, East Yorkshire	50		
Savannah sparrow	Passerculus sandwichensis	April 1982	Isle of Portland, Dorset	3		
Song sparrow	Melospiza melodia	April 1959	Fair Isle, Shetland	8		
Eastern towhee	Pipilo erythrophthalmus	June 1966	Lundy, Devon	1		
Bobolink	Dolichonyx oryzivorus	September 1962	St Agnes, Isles of Scilly	32		
Baltimore oriole	Icterus galbula	September 1980	Unst, Shetland	26		
Red-winged blackbird	Agelaius phoeniceus	April 2017	North Ronaldsay, Orkney	1		
Brown-headed cowbird	Molothrus ater	April 1988	Islay, Inner Hebrides	5		
Ovenbird	Seiurus aurocapilla	October 1973	Out Skerries, Shetland	6		
Northern waterthrush	Parkesia noveboracensis	October 1958	St Agnes, Isles of Scilly	7		
Golden-winged warbler	Vermivora chrysoptera	January 1989	Maidstone, Kent	1		
Black-and-white warbler	Mniotilta varia	October 1936	Scalloway, Shetland	14		
Tennessee warbler	Leiothlypis peregrina	September 1975	Fair Isle, Shetland	4		
Common yellowthroat	Geothlypis trichas	November 1954	Lundy, Devon	10		
Hooded warbler	Setophaga citrina	September 1970	St Agnes, Isles of Scilly	2		
American redstart	Setophaga ruticilla	October 1967	Porthgwarra, Cornwall	6		
Cape May warbler	Setophaga tigrina	June 1977	Paisley, Renfrewshire	2		
Northern parula	Setophaga americana	October 1966	Tresco, Isles of Scilly	15		
Magnolia warbler	Setophaga magnolia	September 1981	St Agnes, Isles of Scilly	2		
Bay-breasted warbler	Setophaga castanea	October 1995	Land's End, Cornwall	1		
Blackburnian warbler	Setophaga fusca	October 1961	Skomer Island, Pembrokeshire	3		
American yellow warbler	Setophaga aestiva	August 1964	Bardsey Island, Gwynedd	6		
Chestnut-sided warbler	Setophaga pensylvanica	September 1985	Fetlar, Shetland	2		
Blackpoll warbler	Setophaga striata	October 1968	St Agnes, Isles of Scilly	48		
Yellow-rumped warbler	Setophaga coronata	January 1955	Newton St Cyres, Devon	22		
Wilson's warbler	Cardellina pusilla	October 1985	Rame Head, Cornwall	2		
Scarlet tanager	Piranga olivacea	4 October 1970	St Mary's, Isles of Scilly	7		
Summer Tanager	Piranga rubra	11 September 1957	Bardsey Island, Wales	1		
Rose-breasted grosbeak	Pheucticus ludovicianus	October 1966	St. Agnes, Isles of Scilly	29		
Indigo bunting	Passerina cyanea	October 1966	Ramsey Island, Pembrokeshire	2		

== Controversial species ==
The following North American species have been recorded, but not accepted as wild by the BOU (i.e., Category D species):

- Wood duck (Aix sponsa)
- Bald eagle (Haliaeetus leucocephalus)
- Yellow-headed blackbird (Xanthocephalus xanthocephalus)

== Confirmed vagrants likely not from North America ==
The following species have ranges in North America or surrounding waters, but the vagrant individuals recorded in Britain likely did not originate in North America.

Species	Binomial name	Vagrant British Subspecies	Resident North American Subspecies	Notes	Reference(s)	Photo of Vagrant in Britain
Pacific golden plover	Pluvialis fulva	monotypic	monotypic	It is expected, given the closer proximity and larger population, that vagrants in Britain come from the Asiatic subpopulation.		
Gull-billed tern	Gelochelidon nilotica	ssp. nilotica	ssp. aranea, ssp. vanrossemi			
Caspian tern	Hydroprogne caspia	monotypic	monotypic	It is assumed that most, if not all Caspian terns seen in Britain come from the Baltic Sea population, given proximity and sightings of ringed individuals.		
South Polar skua	Stercorarius maccormicki	monotypic	monotypic	There is a single record of this species in the British Isles, and while its winter range does include extreme northern parts of North America (e.g., Greenland, Newfoundland & Labrador), it is typically considered an Antarctic species.		
Tengmalm's owl (Boreal owl)	Aegolius funereus	ssp. funereus	ssp. richardsoni			
