= Pernambuco pygmy owl =

Conservation status
- Critically endangered, possibly extinct (IUCN 3.1)
- CITES Appendix II

Scientific classification
- Kingdom: Animalia
- Phylum: Chordata
- Class: Aves
- Order: Strigiformes
- Family: Strigidae
- Genus: Glaucidium
- Species: G. mooreorum

Binomial name
- Glaucidium mooreorum Silva, Coelho & Gonzaga, 2003
- Distribution of Pernambuco pygmy owl Resident

Species of owl

The Pernambuco pygmy owl (Glaucidium mooreorum) is a species of owl in the family Strigidae. This species, first described in 2002, is endemic to Pernambuco state in Brazil.

== Taxonomy and systematics ==
The Pernambuco pygmy owl was first described in December 2002 when two study skins were examined. The skins were originally collected in 1980 and thought to be subspecies of the East Brazilian pygmy owl (Glaucidium minutissimum) or Amazonian pygmy owl (G. hardyi). Upon closer examination of the skins, and vocalizations of the species recorded in 1990, it was concluded that it was a new species.

It was suggested that the type specimen of the East Brazilian pygmy owl is actually of this species, which if true would require that Pernambuco pygmy owl have the binomial G. minutissimum and that the East Brazilian pygmy owl be assigned a new binomial, G. sicki. The suggestion was rejected by the major avian taxonomic systems.

== Description ==
The Pernambuco pygmy owl is about 13 cm (5.1 in) long and weighs about 51 g (1.8 oz). The adult's face is a mix of whitish and brownish streaks and the rest of the head is raw umber with small white dots. The upperparts are chestnut and the tail is blackish brown with lines of white spots making broken bars across it. The underparts are white, the sides of the chest brown, and the flanks streaked with brown. The juvenile plumage is unknown.

A typical Neotropical pygmy-owl of the Glaucidium minutissimum species complex. It has a light grey-chestnut coloured crown and head speckled with conspicuous white spots on the face and head to the lower nape (Fjeldså and Sharpe 2015). Has a white collar and white underparts streaked with rufous. Back is chestnut. Tail dark with white spots. Similar spp. it differs from its geographically closest relatives in its overall lighter colouration, size and voice. Voice a short phrase of 5-7 notes.

== Distribution and habitat ==
The Pernambuco pygmy owl is found only in a small area of Pernambuco state in northeastern Brazil. It has been observed in the canopy of humid forest near its edge at a maximum elevation of 150 m (490 ft) above sea level.

== Behavior ==
=== Feeding ===
One Pernambuco pygmy owl was observed eating a large cicada. Nothing else is known about its diet, which is assumed to include other invertebrates, small mammals, and small reptiles.

=== Breeding ===
The Pernambuco pygmy owl was found to be vocally active during the rainy season, April and May, but no other information about its breeding phenology is known.

=== Vocalization ===
The Pernambuco pygmy owl's song is "a short phrase of 5–7 notes" with each note rising in pitch.

== Status ==
The IUCN has assessed the Pernambuco pygmy owl as being Critically Endangered and Possibly Extinct. It was originally assessed without the Possibly Extinct qualifier, but a 2018 study citing bird extinction patterns and the almost complete destruction of its habitat recommended uplisting the owl to Critically Endangered - Possibly Extinct status. It was uplisted the following year.

The species has not been seen since 2001 despite extensive targeted searches. If still extant, it is assumed to have a tiny and declining population within an extremely small range. Any remaining population is estimated at fewer than fifty adult birds.
