= 1999 in birding and ornithology =

See also 1998 in birding and ornithology, main events of 1999 and 2000 in birding and ornithology

== Worldwide ==
=== New species ===
See also Bird species new to science described in the 1990s

- The jocotoco antpitta from Ecuador is described.

=== Taxonomic developments ===
To be completed

== Europe ==
=== Britain ===
==== Breeding birds ====
- More than 400 red kites fledged across Britain.

==== Migrant and wintering birds ====
- Large numbers of pomarine skuas are seen off the east coast during October and November.

==== Rare birds ====
- The third and fourth Iberian chiffchaffs are seen during the spring.
- Britain's third spectacled warbler is seen in Devon in June.
- The first royal tern for Scotland and fifth for Britain is seen in Lothian in August.
- There is an influx of American waders during September.
- A short-billed dowitcher seen first in Aberdeenshire and then in Cleveland is the first record for Britain.
- Britain's first short-toed eagle (Circaetus gallicus) is found on the Isles of Scilly on 7 October until 11 October
- A black-faced bunting in Northumberland in October is the second for Britain.
- Britain's second mourning dove appears in the Outer Hebrides in November.
- Britain's fifth Balearic woodchat shrike (Lanius senator badius) at Troy Town, St Agnes from 21 to 27 April. (Accepted by the BBRC)

==== Other events ====
- The British Birdwatching Fair has Brazil's Atlantic forests as its theme for the year.

=== Scandinavia ===
To be completed

== North America ==
- In April, Louisiana State University student David Kulivan sees a pair of ivory-billed woodpeckers in the Pearl River Wildlife Management Area on the Louisiana/Mississippi border.

To be completed

== Asia ==
To be completed
