= Frank Rozendaal =

Dutch ornithologist

Frank Gerard Rozendaal
- Born: 9 May 1957; Bloemendaal, Netherlands
- Died: 3 December 2013 (aged 56)
- Education: Utrecht University; Leiden University
- Scientific career
- Fields: Ornithology

Frank Gerard Rozendaal (9 May 1957 – 3 December 2013) was a Dutch ornithologist who in particular did research on the Southeast Asian avifauna. He also contributed to the taxonomy of bats. After field trips in Europe and the Near East he conducted expeditions to South, Southeast and East Asia from 1979 to 1991 where he discovered several new bird, bat and insect taxa.

== Career ==
Rozendaal was born in Bloemendaal, Netherlands in 1957. In 1979, he was among the co-founders of the Dutch Birding Association which is publishing the journal Dutch Birding. He also created the logo of Dutch Birding, which shows a juvenile Ross's gull (Rhodostethia rosea). Rozendaal led the authoritative section on Asian-Pacific birds in this journal until 1994.

In 1981, he published a report about the ornithological work of Dutch naturalist Max Bartels (1871-1936) and his sons in present-day Indonesia. In the same year, he wrote a paper about the ornithological work of Andries Hoogerwerf (1906-1977). In 1984, he described the Halmahera blossom bat (Syconycteris carolinae) which he named for his wife Caroline Rozendaal-Kortekaas who is a biologist and supported her husband on his field work. In the same year he graduated in biology at the Utrecht and the Leiden University. In 1985, he discovered the cinnabar boobook (Ninox ios) which was described by Pamela C. Rasmussen in 1999. During a field trip to Bacan in the Maluku Islands in 1985 the Rozendaals discovered the cicada species Diceropyga bacanensis which was described by J. P. Duffels in 1988. In the same year they discovered the dragonfly Celebophlebia carolinae on Sangir Island. Along with Frank R. Lambert Rozendaal made surveys for the long lost Sangihe whistler (Coracornis sanghirensis) and the cerulean flycatcher (Eutrichomyias rowleyi) on the Sangihe Islands between May and June 1985 but failed to find them. Both species were officially rediscovered in 1995 and 1998 respectively. In 1987, he described the Tanimbar bush warbler (Cettia carolinae) which is also named for his wife. In 1990, he wrote an article on the vocalisations and the taxonomy of the Sulawesi nightjar (Caprimulgus celebensis) In 1993, he described the blue-rumped pitta subspecies Pitta soror flynnstonei which was named for Time photographer Sean Flynn and cameraman Dana Stone who were both presumed killed during the Khmer Rouge terror in Cambodia in the early 1970s and whose graves were discovered in 1991. In 2000, he described the Taiwan bush warbler (Locustella alishanensis) (in collaboration with Rasmussen). Along with George Sangster he described Mees's nightjar (Caprimulgus meesi) in 2004 which was named for Gerlof Fokko Mees (1926-2013).

Besides his ornithological interests, Rozendaal worked as artist and photographer in particular on aircraft and on field hockey. He died after a short illness on 3 December 2013. He is survived by his wife Caroline and his son Max.

In 1984, Rozendaal was honoured in the species' epithet of the gilded tube-nosed bat (Murina rozendaali) by Charles M. Francis and John Edwards Hill.
