= 1998 in birding and ornithology =

See also 1997 in birding and ornithology, main events of 1998 and 1999 in birding and ornithology

== Worldwide ==
=== New species ===
See also Bird species new to science described in the 1990s

- The Sangihe scops owl (Otus collari) is discovered in Indonesia.
- The Nicobar scops owl (Otus alius) is described from a specimen found in a museum drawer.
- The wetland tapaculo (Scytalopus iraiensis) is discovered in Brazil.

=== Taxonomic developments ===
- Caspian gull and yellow-legged gull should be considered separate species according to a paper by Lars Jonsson in the journal Alula.

== Europe ==
- Black woodpecker are expanding their breeding territory to the north and west and now breed in Denmark, the Netherlands, Belgium and France.

=== Britain ===
==== Breeding birds ====
- A record 160 pairs of red kites breed in Wales. 25 pairs breed in Scotland and 75 in England as reintroductions continue.
- Stone curlews increase with at least 206 pairs breeding.
- 536 singing male Cetti's warblers are heard at 168 sites in England, Wales and the Channel Islands.
- House sparrow is placed on the "high alert" list of the British Trust for Ornithology after declining by about two-thirds in 25 years.
- A pair of common rosefinches breed in Cumbria.

==== Migrant and wintering birds ====
- Large numbers of ring ouzels are recorded in South-east England during October.
- Significant influxes of great grey shrikes and shore larks take place in October.

==== Rare birds ====
- Britain's first slender-billed curlew is found in Northumberland in May.
- A Cretzschmar's bunting in the Orkney Islands in May is the third for Britain.
- An eastern Bonelli's warbler in Shetland in August is the third to be accepted as definitely this species.
- Seven surf scoters are found on the western seaboard of Europe between 13 and 29 October. One each in Quessant, Brittany and St Agnes, two in Ireland and three in Cornwall.

==== Other Events ====
- The British Birdwatching Fair has Globally Threatened species as its theme for the year.

=== Ireland ===
- A hermit thrush in County Cork in October is a first for Ireland.

=== Scandinavia ===
- Redhead and western sandpiper are recorded for the first time in Iceland.

=== Spain ===
==== Canary Islands ====
- A great blue heron on Tenerife on 5 December.

== North America ==
- Burrowing owls are released in British Columbia as part of a reintroduction scheme.

== Asia ==
- A black-legged kittiwake in the United Arab Emirates in April is the first record for the country.
