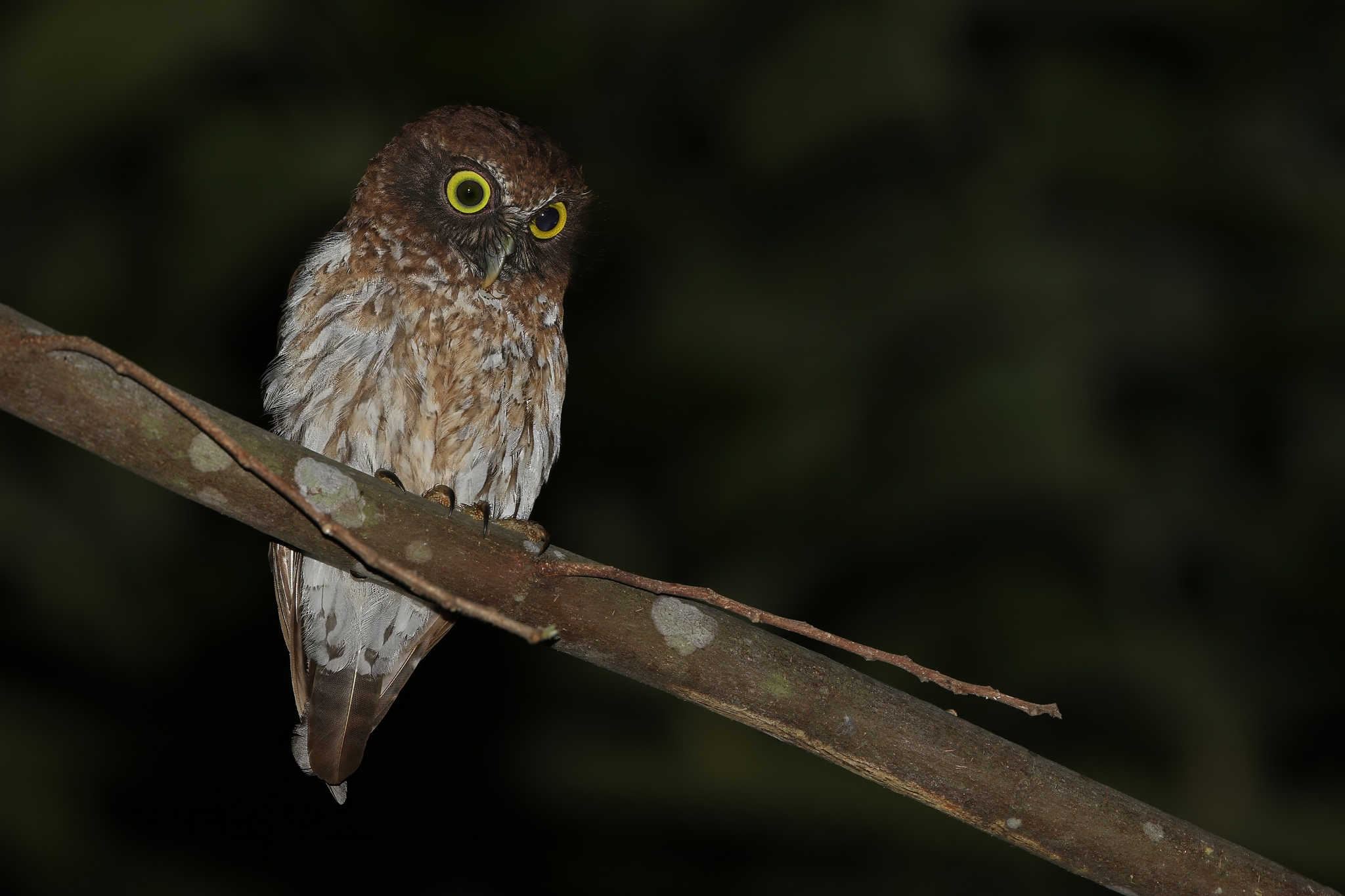

Conservation status
- Near Threatened (IUCN 3.1)
- CITES Appendix II

Scientific classification
- Kingdom: Animalia
- Phylum: Chordata
- Class: Aves
- Order: Strigiformes
- Family: Strigidae
- Genus: Ninox
- Species: N. burhani

Binomial name
- Ninox burhani Indrawan & Somadikarta, 2004

= Togian boobook =

Species of owl

The Togian boobook or Togian hawk-owl (Ninox burhani) is an owl (Strigidae) described as new to science in 2004. The bird is currently known only from three islands in the Togian group, an archipelago in the Gulf of Tomini off the coast of Sulawesi, Indonesia. The new species was discovered on 25 December 1999.

The scientific name honours a local Indonesian conservationist called Burhan.
