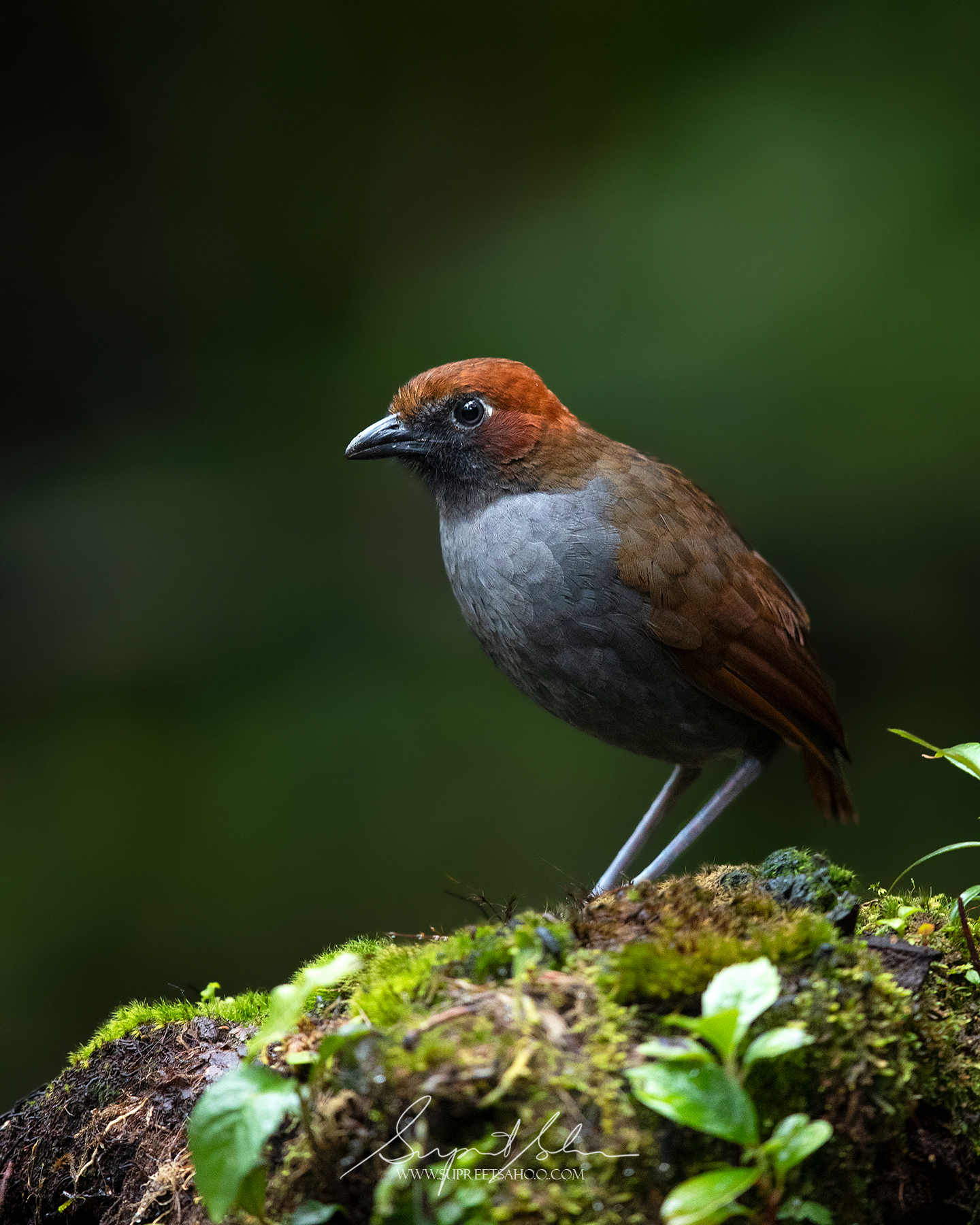

Conservation status
- Least Concern (IUCN 3.1)

Scientific classification
- Kingdom: Animalia
- Phylum: Chordata
- Class: Aves
- Order: Passeriformes
- Family: Grallariidae
- Genus: Grallaria
- Species: G. nuchalis

Binomial name
- Grallaria nuchalis Sclater, PL, 1860

= Chestnut-naped antpitta =

Species of bird

The chestnut-naped antpitta (Grallaria nuchalis) is a species of bird in the family Grallariidae. It is found in Colombia, Ecuador, and Peru.

== Taxonomy and systematics ==
The chestnut-naped antpitta has three subspecies, the nominate G. n. nuchalis (Sclater, PL, 1860), G. n. ruficeps (Sclater, PL, 1874), and G. n. obsoleta (Chubb, 1916). However, some authors have suggested that G. n. obsoleta does not deserve subspecies status and others have suggested that G. n. ruficeps deserves to be treated as a full species. The chestnut-naped antpitta and the pale-billed antpitta (G. carrikeri) form a superspecies.

== Description ==
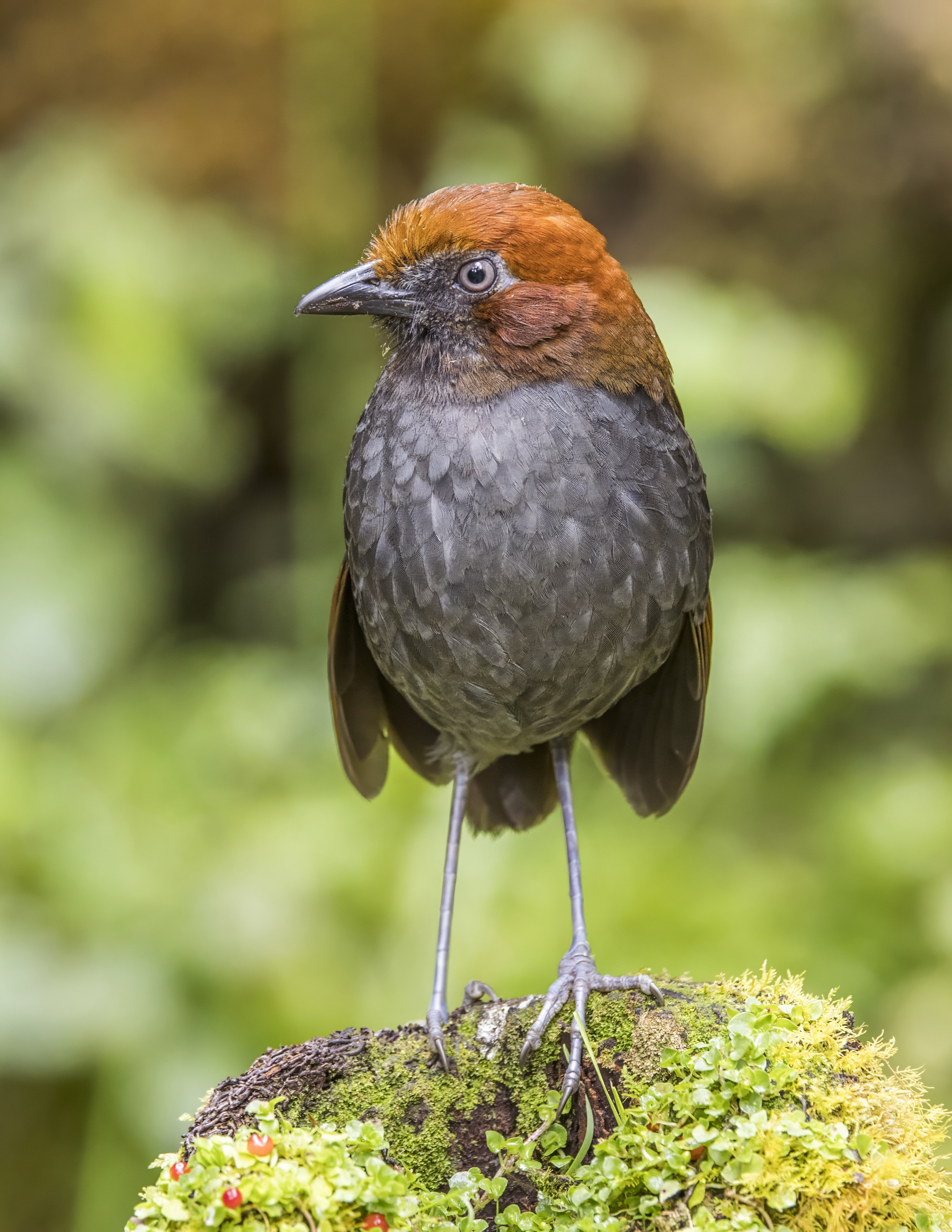
G. n. ruficeps, Colombia

Grallaria antpittas are a "wonderful group of plump and round antbirds whose feathers are often fluffed up...they have stout bills [and] very short tails". The chestnut-naped antpitta is 19.5 to 21 cm (7.7 to 8.3 in) long and weighs 104 to 122 g (3.7 to 4.3 oz). There is no plumage difference of the male and female. Adults of the nominate subspecies have a dark chestnut crown and a rufous-chestnut hindcrown, nape, and face. They have gray lores and a patch of bare white skin behind the eye. Their upperparts and tail are brown. Their wings are mostly brown with tawny-brown primaries. Their underparts are ashy gray that is darkest on the throat. Subspecies G. n. ruficeps has a brighter rufous-chestnut crown, nape, and face and lighter gray underparts than the nominate. G. n. obsoleta has a brown crown, blackish lores, a more chestnut face, olivaceous brown upperparts, and blackish gray underparts. All subspecies have a gray iris, a black bill, and pale blue-gray legs and feet.

== Distribution and habitat ==
The chestnut-naped antpitta has a disjunct distribution. The nominate subspecies is found on the east slope of the Andes at least from Ecuador's Pichincha Province south into northern Peru's Department of Piura; it may be found further north as far as Nariño Department in southwestern Colombia. Subspecies G. n. ruficeps is found on the western slope of Colombia's Eastern Andes in Cundinamarca Department, in the country's Central Andes between Antioquia and Cauca departments, and perhaps in the Western Andes of Antioquia Department. G. n. obsoleta is found on the west slope of the Andes in northern Ecuador's Imbabura and Pichincha provinces.

The chestnut-naped antpitta inhabits temperate to humid montane forest, where it almost entirely occurs in and near dense bamboo stands. It also inhabits the undergrowth of adjacent forest that lacks bamboo. In elevation it occurs between 2,000 and 3,000 m (6,600 and 9,800 ft) in Colombia and Ecuador and between 2,200 and 3,000 m (7,200 and 9,800 ft) in Peru.

== Behavior ==
=== Movement ===
The chestnut-naped antpitta is resident throughout its range.

=== Feeding ===
The diet and foraging behavior of the chestnut-naped antpitta have not been detailed but it is known to feed on insects and other invertebrates. It is primarily terrestrial, hopping on the ground, usually deep in the bamboo. Most sightings, however, are along forest trails in the early dawn.

=== Breeding ===
The chestnut-naped antpitta's breeding season has not been fully defined but appears to include November to January. The only known nest was a large cup made mostly of bamboo leaves with a few small sticks and some moss. It was about 3 m (10 ft) above the ground in a bamboo thicket and held two nestlings. Nothing else is known about the species' breeding biology.

=== Vocalization ===
The chestnut-naped antpitta sings mostly at dawn and dusk, and usually from a hidden low perch. Its "distinctive and often-heard song [is] a series of 4-7 well-enunciated and emphatic whistled notes, the first set all similar but the last long and sharply upslurred, e.g. 'keeu, kew-kew-kew k-wheeeei?'". It also "gives various shorter calls consisting of fewer initial notes plus the last slurred one, or just the slurred one alone".

== Status ==
The IUCN has assessed the chestnut-naped antpitta as being of Least Concern. It has a large range; its population size is not known and is believed to be stable. No immediate threats have been identified. It is considered locally fairly common in Colombia, uncommon in eastern Ecuador and scarcer in the west, and fairly common in Peru. "[C]urrent assessment methods, including [the authors'], do not include subspecies, and the conservation of eastern and western Andean subspecies is a critical component which should be factored into future models. It is particularly important for isolated races ... which likely represent significant evolutionary units."
