= Siem Pang Wildlife Sanctuary =

Protected area in Cambodia

- ដែនជម្រកសត្វព្រៃសៀមប៉ាង
- IUCN category IV (habitat/species management area)
- Location within Cambodia
- Location: Siem Pang, Stung Treng, Cambodia
- Coordinates: 14°07′00″N 106°14′00″E
- Area: 133,707.73 ha (516.2484 sq mi)
- Established: November 6, 2019
- Governing body: Ministry of Environment

Siem Pang Wildlife Sanctuary (Khmer: ដែនជម្រកសត្វព្រៃសៀមប៉ាង) is a 133,707.73 ha (516.2484 sq mi) wildlife sanctuary located in Santepheap, Thma Keo, and Prek Meas communes, Siem Pang District, Stung Treng Province, created on November 6, 2019, according to Sub-decree no.161 ANKr.BK. This combined the two wildlife sanctuaries: Siem Pang and Western Siem Pang, which were established in 2016.

== History ==
- May 9, 2016: Siem Pang Wildlife Sanctuary (Khmer: ដែនជម្រកសត្វព្រៃសៀមប៉ាង), 66,932 ha (258.43 sq mi), created according to Sub-decree no.86 ANKr.BK.
- May 9, 2016: Western Siem Pang Wildlife Sanctuary (Khmer: ដែនជម្រកសត្វព្រៃសៀមប៉ាងខាងលិច), 65,389 ha (252.47 sq mi), created according to Sub-decree no.76 ANKr.BK.
- February 25, 2014: Siem Pang Protected Forest (Khmer: តំបន់ព្រៃការពារសម្រាប់អភិរក្សធនធានសេនេទិច រុក្ខជាតិ និងសត្វព្រៃសៀមប៉ាង ខេត្តស្ទឹងត្រែង, known as ព្រៃការពារសៀមប៉ាង), 66,932 ha (258.43 sq mi), created according to Sub-decree no.77 ANKr.BK, administered by Ministry of Agriculture, Forestry and Fisheries. It was part of a large protected area complex that includes the Xe Pian protected area in Laos and the Virachey National Park in Cambodia, and Chư Mom Ray National Park in Vietnam. The area is important for several critically endangered bird species including the giant ibis and white-shouldered ibis.

== External ==
- Cambodian jewel protected by BirdLife International
- New protection for giant ibis by Phnom Penh Post
- Cambodia protects forest for giant ibis by Mongabay
