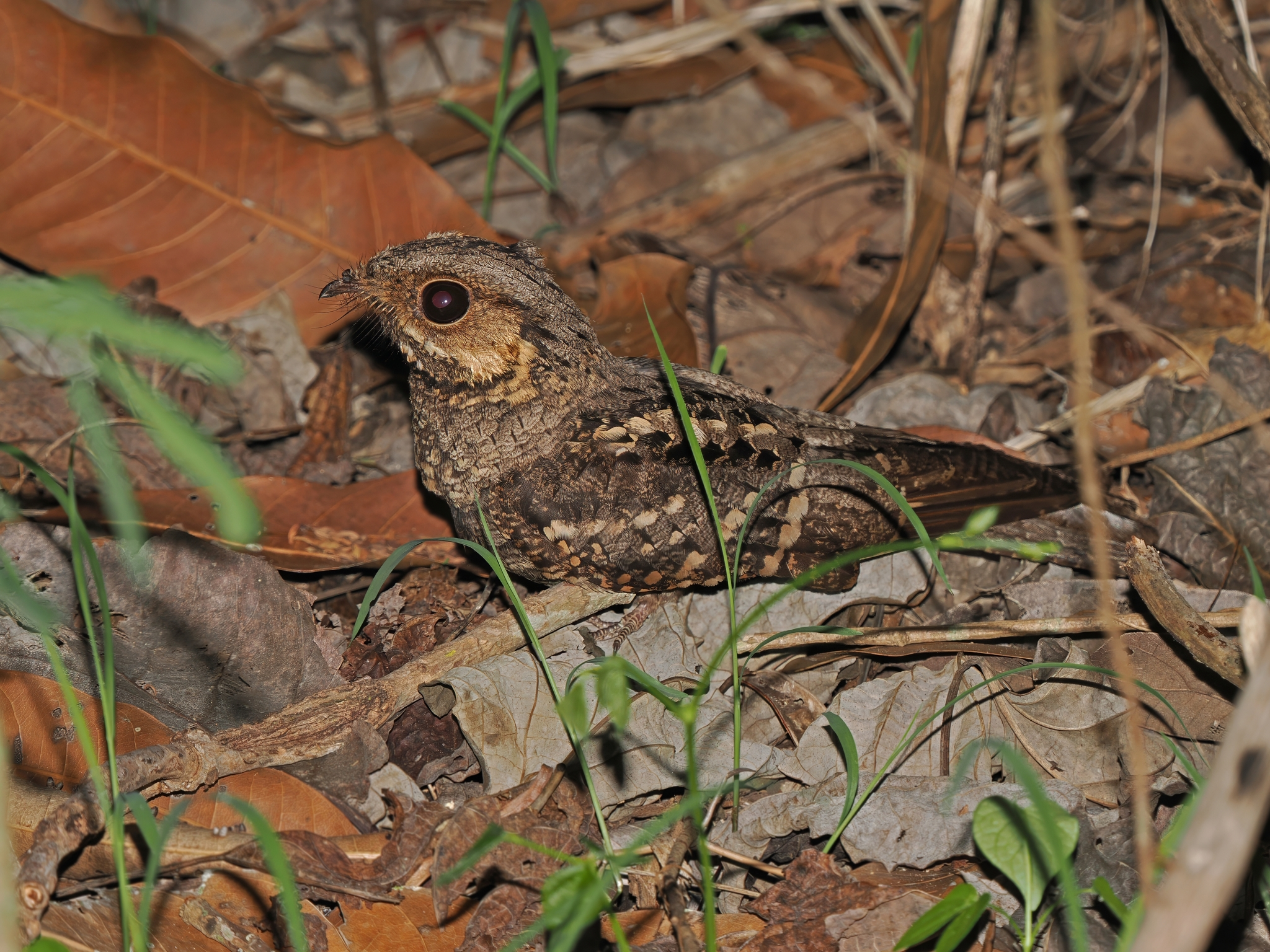

Conservation status
- Least Concern (IUCN 3.1)

Scientific classification
- Kingdom: Animalia
- Phylum: Chordata
- Class: Aves
- Order: Caprimulgiformes
- Family: Caprimulgidae
- Genus: Caprimulgus
- Species: C. meesi

Binomial name
- Caprimulgus meesi Sangster & Rozendaal, 2004

= Mees's nightjar =

Species of bird

Mees's nightjar (Caprimulgus meesi) is a member of the nightjar family (Caprimulgidae) described as new to science in 2004.

It is a representative of the large-tailed nightjar complex found on Flores and Sumba, Indonesia. Previously unrecognised as a separate taxon due to its lack of morphological distinctness, Sangster and Rozendaal (2004) described this new species on the basis of its vocalisations, which differ significantly from those of the large-tailed nightjar races resident on other islands in the Lesser Sundas.

The species is named after Gerlof Mees, former curator of the Natural History Museum, Leiden.
