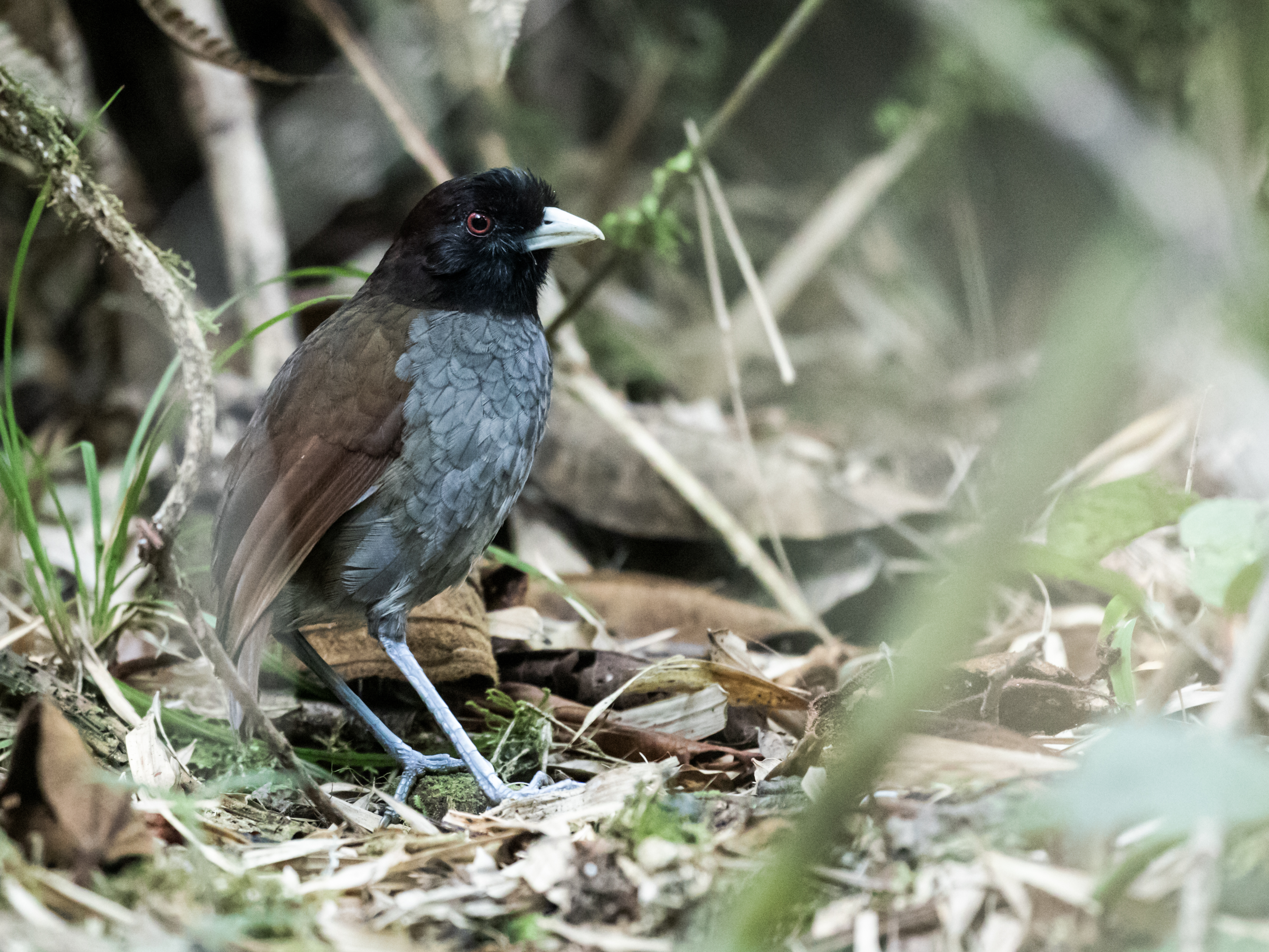

Conservation status
- Least Concern (IUCN 3.1)

Scientific classification
- Kingdom: Animalia
- Phylum: Chordata
- Class: Aves
- Order: Passeriformes
- Family: Grallariidae
- Genus: Grallaria
- Species: G. carrikeri

Binomial name
- Grallaria carrikeri Schulenberg & Williams, MD, 1982

= Pale-billed antpitta =

Species of bird

The pale-billed antpitta (Grallaria carrikeri) is a species of bird in the family Grallariidae. It is endemic to Peru.

== Taxonomy and systematics ==
The pale-billed antpitta is monotypic. It and the chestnut-naped antpitta (G. nuchalis) form a superspecies.

== Description ==
Grallaria antpittas are a "wonderful group of plump and round antbirds whose feathers are often fluffed up...they have stout bills [and] very short tails". The pale-billed antpitta is 20 to 21 cm (7.9 to 8.3 in) long and weighs 96 to 124 g (3.4 to 4.4 oz). The sexes have the same plumage. Adults have a black forecrown, lores, and cheeks. Their ear coverts have black bases and blackish brown ends. Their crown is blackish brown that becomes dark olivaceous brown on their nape. Their back and rump are dark olivaceous brown with thin black tips on the feathers. Their tail is dusky brown. Their flight feathers are dusky brown with dark chestnut outer webs, and their upperwing coverts are dark chestnut. Their chin is black and their throat blackish gray. Their underparts are mostly light gray that is darker on the sides of the breast and becomes almost white on the center of the belly; the breast and upper belly feathers have narrow black tips. Their flanks and undertail coverts are buffy olive. Both sexes have a pale reddish brown iris, an ivory bill, and blue-gray legs and feet. Juveniles have a blackish gray head with black lores. Their nape's feathers have a brown tinge and cinnamon tips. Much of the rest of their plumage is cinnamon brown with black bars except on the lower belly, which is buffy with a creamy white center. Their primary coverts have cinnamon-buff tips and a black band near the end.

== Distribution and habitat ==
The pale-billed antpitta is found on the east slope of the Peruvian Andes. Its range extends from central Amazonas Department south at least to southeastern La Libertad Department. It inhabits the understory of humid montane forest with a broken canopy, lush growth of epiphytes, and thickets of Chusquea bamboo. In elevation it ranges between 2,350 and 2,900 m (7,700 and 9,500 ft).

== Behavior ==
=== Movement ===
The pale-billed antpitta is resident throughout its range.

=== Feeding ===
The pale-billed antpitta's diet has not been detailed but is known to include arthropods and is suspected to also include small vertebrates like frogs. It forages on the ground or within about 1 m (3 ft) of it, and usually in dense vegetation.

=== Breeding ===
The pale-billed antpitta's breeding season is not known but includes October, when its only nest was discovered with two nestlings. It was a shallow cup made of sticks and decaying leaves with a lining of rootlets. It was 3 m (10 ft) above the ground on a downed tree trunk on a very steep slope. Both adults brooded and provisioned the nestlings. The species' incubation period, time to fledging, and other details of parental care are not known.

=== Vocalization ===
The pale-billed antpitta's song is "a series of low hoots, first a higher note, then a stuttered series of lower notes: WHEE wur'KUK-KUK-KUK-KUK KUK". Its call is "a series of high, metallic teet notes".

== Status ==
The IUCN originally in 2004 assessed the pale-billed antpitta as being of Least Concern, then in 2013 as Near Threatened, and in 2020 again as of Least Concern. It has a restricted range and its estimated population of 90,000 mature individuals is believed to be decreasing. The primary threat is habitat degradation and loss. "The elevations inhabited by the species on the east slope of the Cordillera Central are currently impacted primarily by clearance for cattle ranching and the associated disturbance. Habitat loss outside protected areas is increasing rapidly." "Much of the region occupied by the Pale-billed Antpitta is remote and still has a relatively low human population density, however." It is considered uncommon throughout its range.
