= Forktail (journal) =

Peer-reviewed scientific journal

- Discipline: Ornithology
- Language: English
- Edited by: Frank E. Rheindt

Publication details
- History: 1984–present
- Publisher: Oriental Bird Club (United Kingdom)
- Frequency: Annually

Standard abbreviations
- ISO 4: Forktail

Indexing
- ISSN: 0950-1746

Links
- Journal homepage

Forktail is the annual peer-reviewed journal of the Oriental Bird Club. It is the principal ornithological journal dedicated to the Oriental region and publishes manuscripts in English, treating any aspect of its ornithology (e.g., distribution, biology, conservation, ecology, taxonomy and evolution). Forktail's geographic scope is bounded by the Indus River to the west; the Russian Far East, Korean Peninsula, Japan, and Lydekker's Line (i.e. the eastern boundary of Wallacea) to the east, and the Chagos Archipelago, Lesser Sundas, Christmas Island and Cocos (Keeling) Islands to the south. As of 2020, Frank E. Rheindt is its Managing Editor, assisted by Yong Ding Li.

Each issue is A4 in size, with an emerald green cover. Important papers published in Forktail include descriptions of three new bird species: the Bukidnon woodcock in 2001, the Calayan rail in 2004, and the Cambodian tailorbird in 2013.

The Oriental Bird Club also publishes another periodical, a twice-yearly bulletin called BirdingASIA.

== See also ==
- List of ornithology journals
