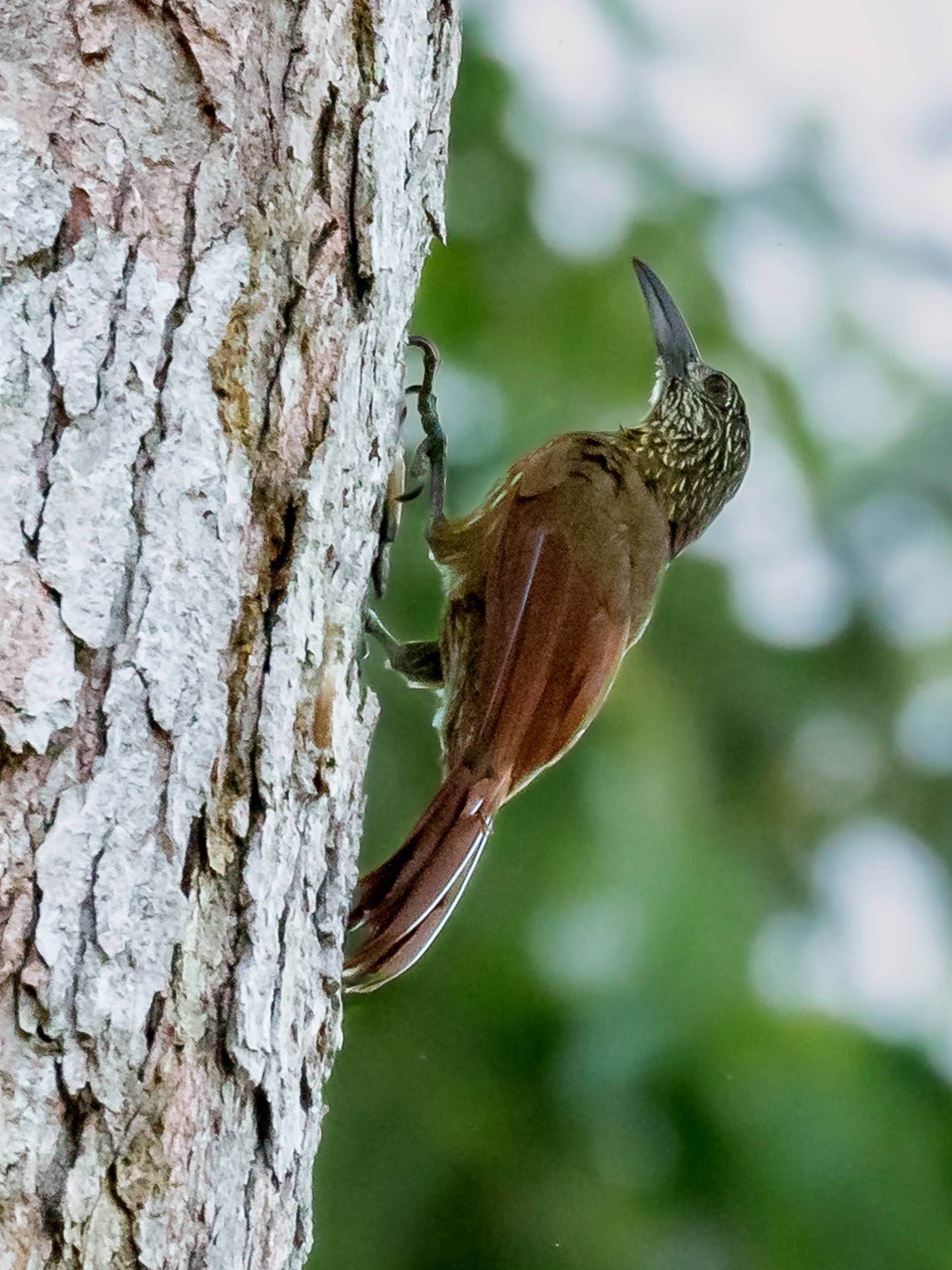

Scientific classification
- Domain: Eukaryota
- Kingdom: Animalia
- Phylum: Chordata
- Class: Aves
- Order: Passeriformes
- Family: Furnariidae
- Genus: Xiphocolaptes
- Species: X. carajaensis

Binomial name
- Xiphocolaptes carajaensis (Silva, Novaes & Oren, 2002)

= Carajás woodcreeper =

Species of bird

The Carajás woodcreeper (Xiphocolaptes carajaensis) is a species of bird in the Dendrocolaptinae subfamily, the woodcreepers. Also considered by some as a subspecies of Xiphocolaptes promeropirhynchus. It is found in the state of Pará, Brazil.
