= Mick Rogers (wildlife warden) =

Mick Rogers was warden of Portland Bird Observatory and Field Centre at Portland Bill, Dorset, England from 1979 to 1995 (not to be confused with Mike Rogers, secretary of the British Birds Rarities Committee).

He was born in 1943, and died at Addenbrookes Hospital, Cambridge on 27 April 2003 as a result of a brain haemorrhage. From 1975 to 1978 he was barman on Lundy Island "so that he could act as the Lundy Field Society's unofficial representative and warden in his free time."

Rogers' reputation among the British birding community was of someone who took the scientific study of birds extremely seriously, and believed that "serious" ornithology should take precedence over "popular" approaches at all times. As an illustration, following the publication in British Birds magazine of an account by Robin Chittenden of the finding of a northern parula on the Isles of Scilly in October 1983 (Chittenden 1986), in which Chittenden wrote effusively about his excitement at this find, which was then only the fourth record for Britain, Rogers wrote to the British Birds letters page criticising both Chittenden for an article consisting of "60 lines full of irrelevances", and the journal's editors for "letting editorial standards slip ... perhaps in an attempt to widen [the journal's] circulation" (Rogers 1987). Providing information and encouragement to casual birding visitors to Portland Bill was low on Rogers' list of priorities compared with the day-to-day running of the observatory; as a result, many birders visiting Portland for the first time felt that they were not welcome there.

His predecessor as warden was Iain Robertson, and his successor was Martin Cade, who had previously been the observatory's assistant warden.
