= Nanquidno =

Hamlet in Cornwall, England

Coordinates: 50.102°N 5.689°W

Nanquidno: Cornish: Nansgwydnyow
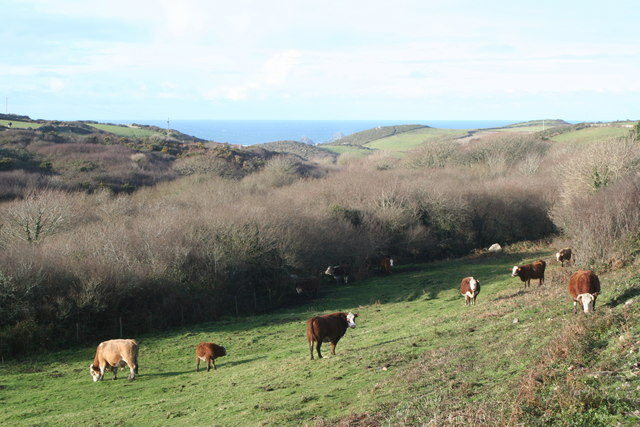
- Pasture in the valley at Nanquidno

- Location within Cornwall
- OS grid reference: SW363290
- Civil parish: St Just
- Unitary authority: Cornwall
- Ceremonial county: Cornwall
- Region: South West
- Country: England
- Sovereign state: United Kingdom

Nanquidno (Cornish: Nansgwydnyow) is a hamlet near St Just in Penwith in west Cornwall, England. It is about half a mile southwest of Kelynack.
