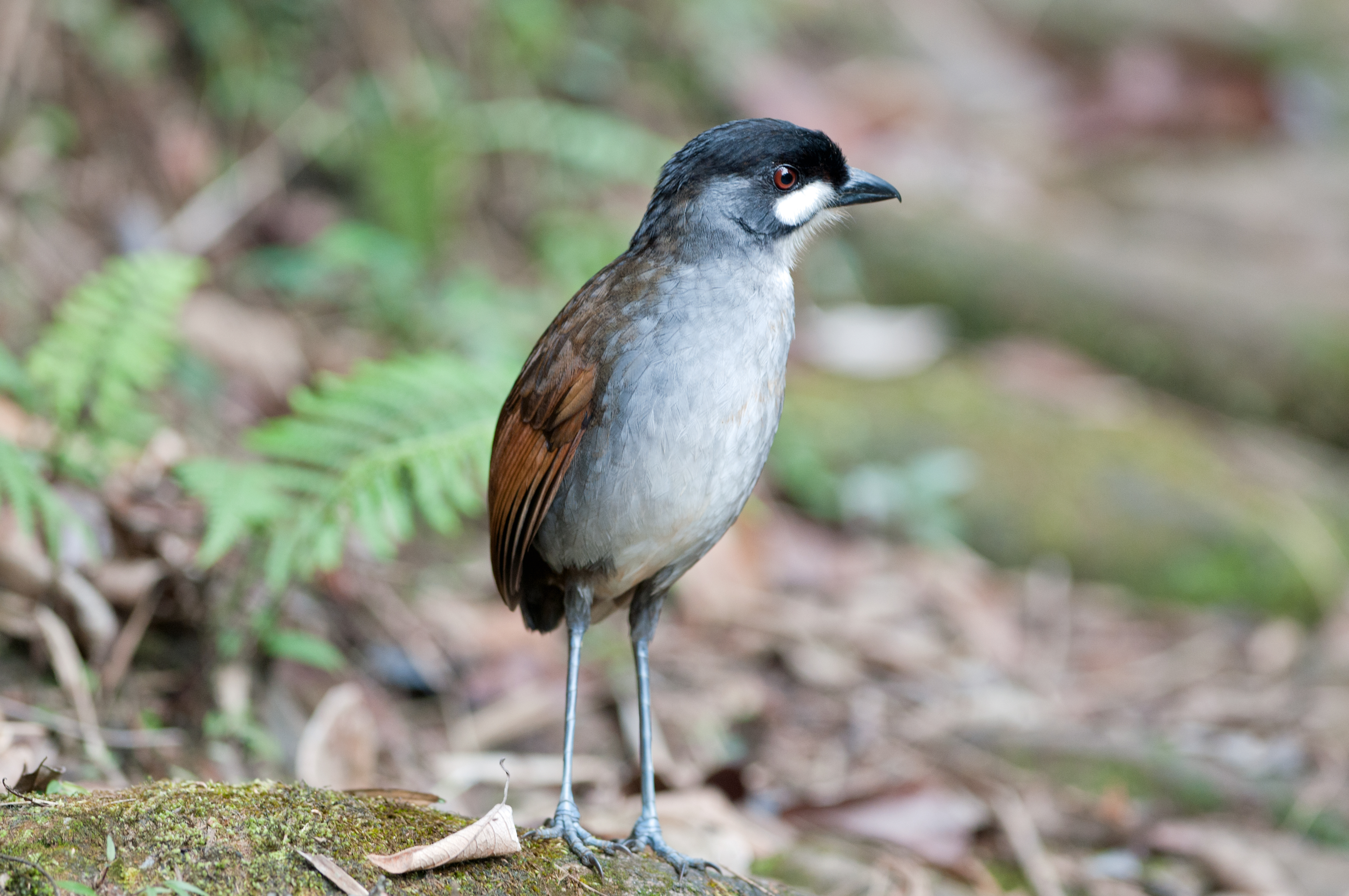
- In Tapichalaca Reserve, Ecuador

Conservation status
- Endangered (IUCN 3.1)

Scientific classification
- Kingdom: Animalia
- Phylum: Chordata
- Class: Aves
- Order: Passeriformes
- Family: Grallariidae
- Genus: Grallaria
- Species: G. ridgelyi

Binomial name
- Grallaria ridgelyi Krabbe, Agro, Rice, Jacome, Navarrete & Sornoza, 1999
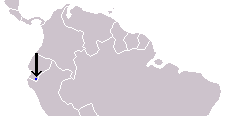
- Known Ecuadorian range in blue. Now also confirmed from adjacent Peru.

= Jocotoco antpitta =

Species of bird

The jocotoco antpitta (Grallaria ridgelyi) is an endangered species of bird in the family Grallariidae. It is found in Ecuador and Peru.

== Taxonomy and systematics ==
The jocotoco antpitta is monotypic. Its closest relatives appear to be the chestnut-naped antpitta (G. muchalis) and the pale-billed antpitta (G. carrikeri).

The jocotoco antpitta's specific epithet honors the ornithologist Robert S. Ridgely, who took part in the initial documentation of this species in 1997. The common name refers to the local name of the bird, jocotoco, which is onomatopoetic after its hooting call.

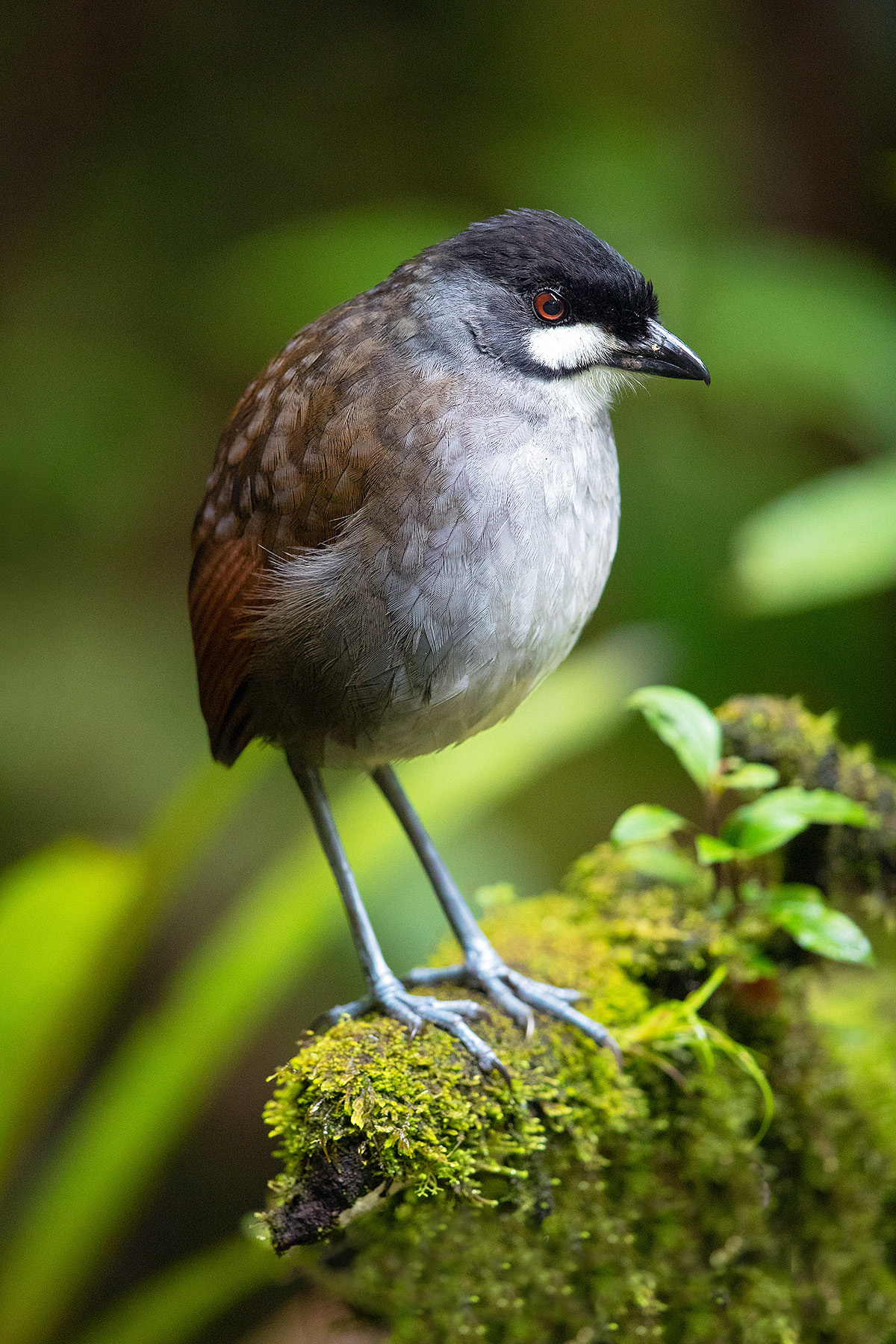

== Description ==
Grallaria antpittas are a "wonderful group of plump and round antbirds whose feathers are often fluffed up...they have stout bills [and] very short tails". The jocotoco antpitta is the largest member of its family. It is 20 to 24 cm (7.9 to 9.4 in) long and weighs about 150 to 200 g (5.3 to 7.1 oz). The sexes have the same plumage. Adults have a black crown and brownish olive nape. They have a large, somewhat shaggy, fan-shaped white patch from the bill to below the eye. Their ear coverts are gray. Their upperparts are brownish olive with a black wash that lessens from the mantle to the rump. Their tail is reddish brown. Their flight feathers have blackish inner webs and cinnamon outer webs, and their upperwing coverts are brownish olive with a black band. Their throat is snowy white. Their underparts are mostly light gray that is darker on the flanks which also have a brownish olive wash. Their undertail coverts are brownish olive with fine black bars. Both sexes have a dark red to crimson reddish brown iris, a black bill, and blue-gray legs and feet. Juveniles are similar to adults but more muted and with a chestnut crown.

== Distribution and habitat ==
The jocotoco antpitta is known only from a very small number of locations in southeastern Ecuador and adjacent Peru. It was originally believed to be limited to the upper Chinchipe River drainage in Zamora-Chinchipe, Ecuador, but in 2006 a population was discovered in Cordillera del Cóndor in Cajamarca, Peru. It inhabits steep slopes within wet, dense, mossy forest with Chusquea bamboo stands and silvery-leaved Cecropia trees. In Ecuador it occurs between 2,300 and 2,650 m (7,500 and 8,700 ft). The observations in Peru were made at about 2,250 m (7,400 ft).

== Behavior ==
=== Movement ===
The jocotoco antpitta is resident throughout its range.

=== Feeding ===
The jocotoco antpitta is one of several antpittas that regularly come to feeding stations set up to view them. There they are fed earthworms, which are thought to also be a large part of their natural diet. In the wild they also feed on arthropods and other invertebrates. They are almost entirely terrestrial, seeking prey by probing leaf litter with their bill and flipping it with their bill and feet. They occasionally follow army ant swarms to capture prey disturbed by the ants.

=== Breeding ===
The jocotoco antpitta's breeding season is not known but includes November. The first nest discovered was a deep cup made mostly from decaying leaves lined with fine rootlets and fern stems. It was supported by a dense bromeliad tuft against the trunk of a tree 3.6 m (12 ft) above the ground. It contained one nestling, which both parents provisioned. The incubation period, time to fledging, and other details of parental care are not known.

=== Vocalization ===
The jocotoco antpitta's song is "a slow series of 6–10 (or more) identical notes produced at 0.5–0.6 kHz, and delivered at 1–2 second intervals". The note has been described as "a low-pitched hooting 'hoo' " and the song can last for a minute or more. It has been likened to a dog bark and a cow's moo. One call is "a staccato hoó-có-kurr" which is the inspiration for the species' common name. The species typically sings around dawn and dusk but is very responsive to recordings of its song and will answer them at any time of day.

== Status ==
The IUCN has assessed the jocotoco antpitta as Endangered (B1ab(iii)+2ab(iii)). It has an estimated area of occupancy of 252 km^{2} (97 sq mi) within an overall range of about 1,300 km^{2} (500 sq mi). Its estimated population of 480 to 600 mature individuals is believed to be decreasing. The Tapichalaca Biological Reserve was established in 1998 by the Fundación de Conservación Jocotoco to protect the species' core range, and it also occurs at the far southern end of Podocarpus National Park. However, "[m]uch of the range is threatened by logging and gold mining, including areas within Podocarpus National Park". Its actual area of occurrence may be as small as 25 km^{2} (9.7 sq mi).
