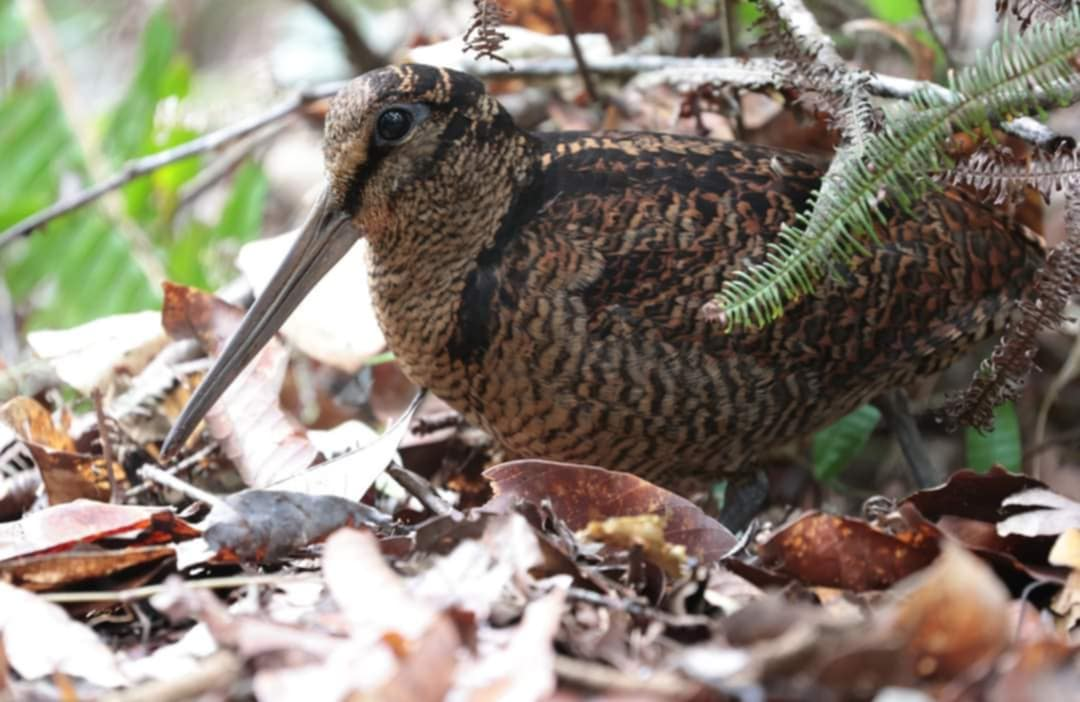

Conservation status
- Least Concern (IUCN 3.1)

Scientific classification
- Kingdom: Animalia
- Phylum: Chordata
- Class: Aves
- Order: Charadriiformes
- Family: Scolopacidae
- Genus: Scolopax
- Species: S. bukidnonensis

Binomial name
- Scolopax bukidnonensis Kennedy, Fisher, TH, Harrap, Diesmos & Manamtam, 2001

= Bukidnon woodcock =

Species of bird

The Bukidnon woodcock (Scolopax bukidnonensis), or Philippine woodcock is a medium-sized wader. It was only described as new to science as recently as 2001, although the initial specimens had been collected on Luzon in the 1960s, these were originally misidentified as Eurasian woodcock specimens. It was not until the bird was heard calling in 1993, and new specimens obtained on Mindanao in 1995, that it was realised that the species was new. It is listed as Least Concern by the IUCN.

== Description and taxonomy ==
The Bukidnon woodcock is rich reddish-brown above, finely barred and vermiculated with black and broadly barred with blackish markings across the crown, the underparts are paler and buffer. The eye is placed high and far back on the head, and the beak is long with a flexible tip to extract worms and other invertebrates from the soil.

== Behaviour and ecology ==
Believed to feed at night or at dusk in areas with thick moss and foliage where it possibly feeds on worms and other invertebrates

These birds fly in a wide circuit over the forest, giving a loud, metallic, rattling `pip-pip-pip-pip-pip` interspersed by very quiet grunts.

Little is known about the bird in the wild. It is described as having a "roding" display flight in January to March just before dawn, like other birds of the genus. Nest has been recorded in February and September with 2 eggs.

== Habitat and conservation ==
This species is restricted to mountain forests (over 1000 meters above sea level) on the islands of Mindanao (four mountaintops) and Luzon (center and north) in the Philippines. Its habitat is extremely remote and rugged, and is unsuitable for either logging or agriculture.

The Bukidnon woodcock has a large range and it is relatively common within that range. Its population size has not been quantified but the IUCN has listed it as being of "Least Concern", believing that any decline in population is too slow as to justify placing the bird in a more threatened category. As it occurs in rugged and inaccessible mountains, this has allowed a large portion of its habitat to remain intact. However, there it is still affected by habitat loss through deforestation, mining, land conversion and slash-and-burn - just not to the same extent as lowland forest.
