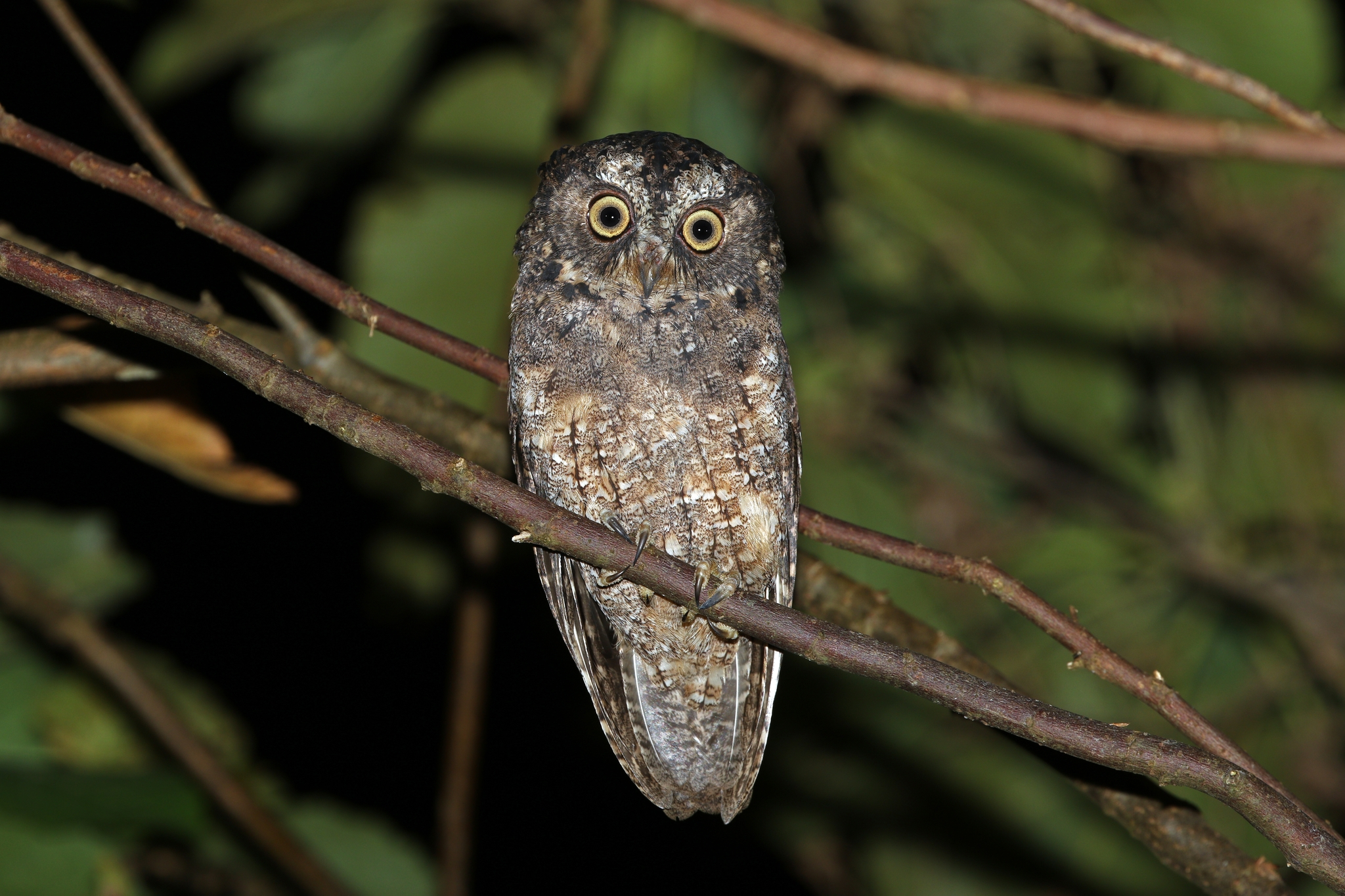

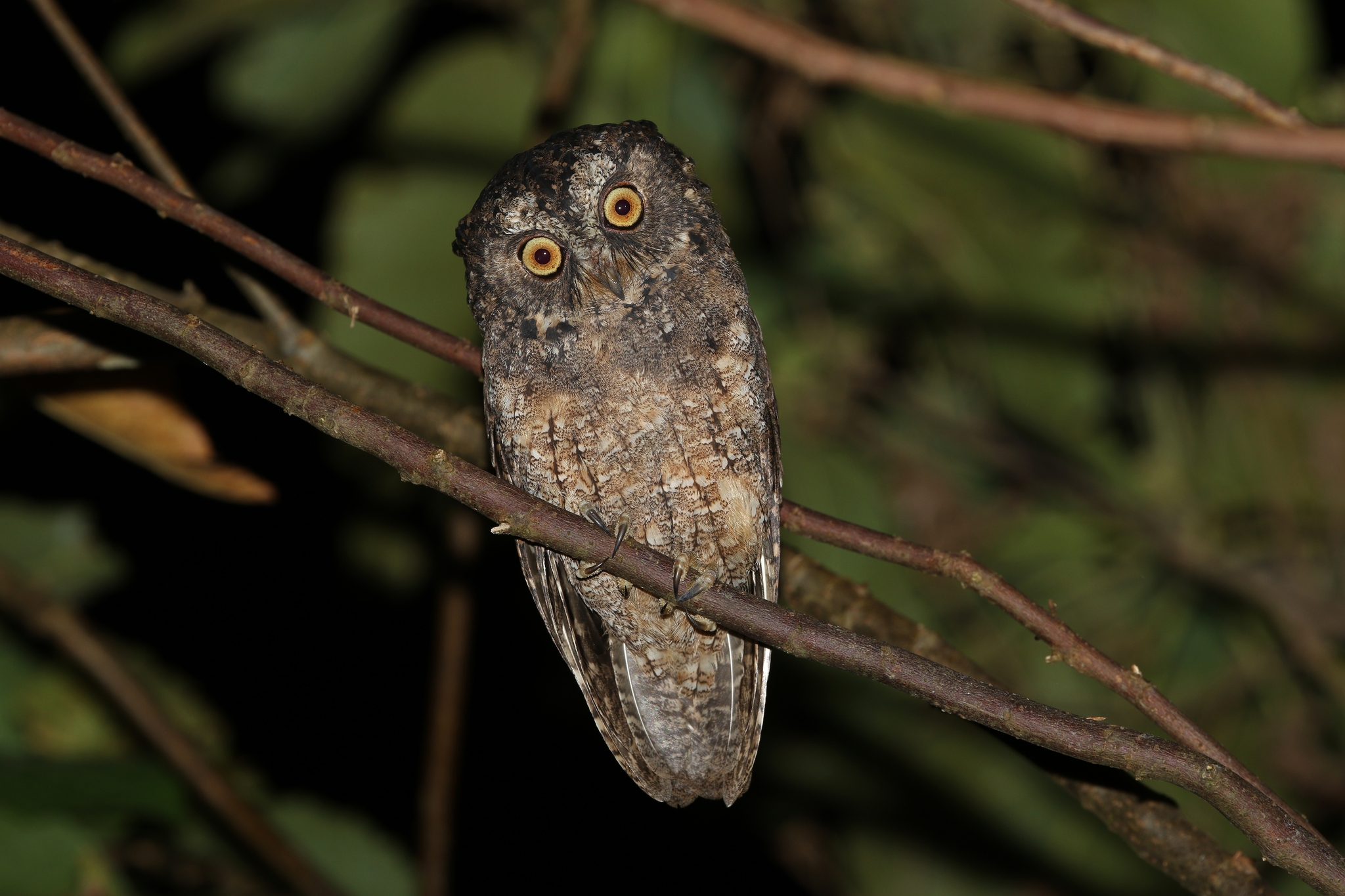

Conservation status
- Least Concern (IUCN 3.1)
- CITES Appendix II

Scientific classification
- Kingdom: Animalia
- Phylum: Chordata
- Class: Aves
- Order: Strigiformes
- Family: Strigidae
- Genus: Otus
- Species: O. collari

Binomial name
- Otus collari Lambert & Rasmussen, 1998

= Sangihe scops owl =

Species of owl

The Sangihe scops owl (Otus collari) is an owl species endemic to the Sangihe Island of Indonesia.

== Size ==
The Sangihe scops owl is relatively small. This bird has long narrow wings, a small beak and tail. The owl has weak toes and claws. The length of the owl's ear tufts is a moderate length. Their wing length is around 158–166 mm, and their average weight is 76 grams. The overall average length measurement of this bird is 7.5–7.8 inches tall.

== Description ==
The Sangihe scops owl has a brown complexion to it. However, its facial disk has a pinch of white above the eyes. It has sporadic black streaks and patches, as each bird is unique and excellent for camouflage in its forest habitat. The upper parts are brown with dark shaft streaks. The bird's eyes are yellow with red pupils. It has tan feathers in its midsection. Along with that, the Sangihe scops owl's call sounds similar to a frail whistle. Its call is high pitched and can last from 7–8 seconds long.

== History ==
The Sangihe scops owl is most likely part of a species group centered on Otus manadensis. Their original specimens were collected in 1866 and 1867. These owls were thought to be part of Otus magicus for a little bit. However, in 1996, examination of photographs and vocalization revealed that their species had differences from both O. mandensis and O. magicus. These birds are very closely related to O. mandensis because of their strong similarities, but are considered to be a separate species. The Sangihe scops owl is one of the 17 species of scops owls that can be found in Indonesia and is a member of the family Strigidae. The nocturnal Sangihe scops owl is distinguished by its unique sounds, which resemble high-pitched whistles. It is monotypic, no subspecies are recognized.

== Diet ==
Their diet consists of eating large insects, earthworms, small reptiles, mammals and birds.

== Threats and population ==
These birds do not have any danger that can threaten their population dramatically, but they still have minor threats. These threats consist of destruction of primary forest taking away their habitats. Along with that, these birds also have threats from larger species hunting them. They are not globally threatened, and observations show that the species readily tolerates human-altered habitats. However, there will always be environmental dangers such as deforestation and natural disasters. Their population ranges somewhere in between 10,000-25,000 and has been confirmed to be sustained. These birds appear widespread and relatively common within the single-island range of the Sangihe Islands.

== Habitat ==
These birds are exclusive to the islands of Sangihe, mainly in North Sangihe in Southeast Asia next to Indonesia. They favor forests and mixed plantations. It is common and widespread on the island. They commonly reside in agricultural areas with trees up to 1150 feet and bushes.
