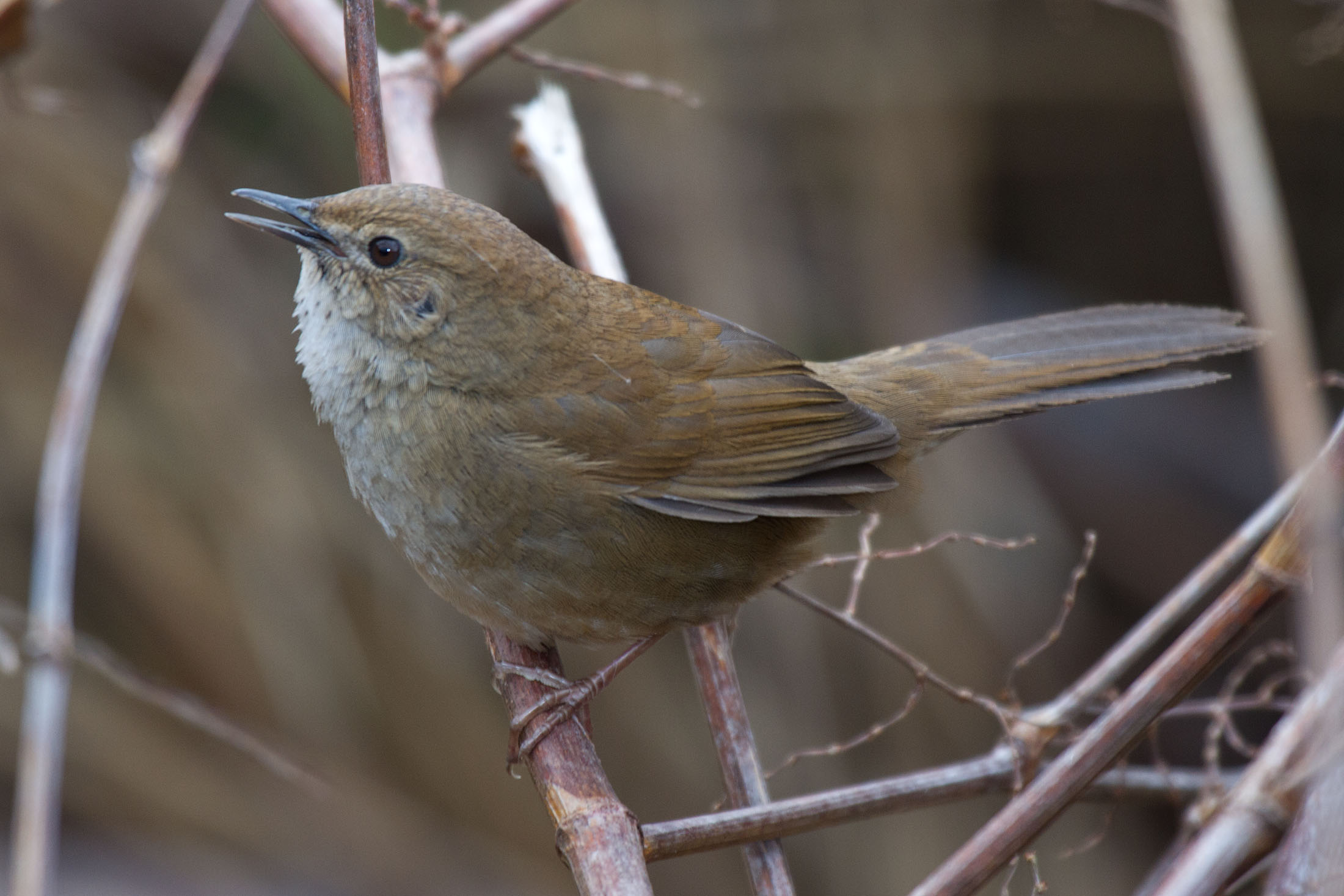

Conservation status
- Least Concern (IUCN 3.1)

Scientific classification
- Kingdom: Animalia
- Phylum: Chordata
- Class: Aves
- Order: Passeriformes
- Family: Locustellidae
- Genus: Locustella
- Species: L. alishanensis

Binomial name
- Locustella alishanensis (Rasmussen, Round, Dickinson & Rozendaal, 2000)

Synonyms
- Bradypterus alishanensis Rasmussen, Round, Dickinson & Rozendaal, 2000

= Taiwan bush warbler =

Species of bird

The Taiwan bush warbler (Locustella alishanensis) is a species of Old World warbler in the family Locustellidae. It is found only in Taiwan. Its natural habitat is undergrowth and grassland 1,200–3,000 m (3,900–9,800 ft) in elevation. It was first recorded in 1917 and named as a distinct species in 2000. The International Union for Conservation of Nature (IUCN) has assessed it as a least-concern species.

== Taxonomy ==
This bush warbler was first recorded from Alishan in 1917. At first, it was thought to be a population of Bradypterus luteoventris. In 1952, Jean Théodore Delacour placed it within subspecies idoneus of B. seebohmi (now split into several species). Later authorities placed it in subspecies melanorhynchus. In the late 1980s, its song was found to be very distinctive, unlike other related species. In 2000, Pamela C. Rasmussen, Philip D. Round, Edward C. Dickinson and Frank Rozendaal described the population as a distinct species, Bradypterus alishanensis, based on its distinctive song and morphological observations. It was later transferred to the genus Locustella. A 2015 study concluded that it was the sister taxon of the russet bush warbler (Locustella mandelli) species complex, being genetically more divergent than the species in the complex.

== Description ==
The Taiwan bush warbler is about 14 cm (5.5 in) long and weighs about 10 g (0.35 oz). The male and female are alike. The head is dull rufous-brown, the crown having narrow dark tips. The indistinct supercilium and eye-ring are pale buff. The upperparts, from the mantle to the wings and tail, are dull russet-brown. The chin and throat are white, the lower throat usually having spots. The upper breast is greyish brown, and the lower breast and belly are white. The undertail coverts are dark rufous-brown with warm-coloured tips. The beak is black, and in winter the lower mandible is sometimes pale. The feet are pale pink, and the eyes are reddish brown. The juvenile bird has a brownish breast and does not have spots.

== Distribution and habitat ==
This species is endemic to Taiwan. It breeds in mountains 1,200–3,000 m (3,900–9,800 ft) above sea level, sometimes below 1,000 m (3,300 ft). It does not migrate, but in winter, it may move to lower elevations. Its habitat is deciduous and coniferous woodland with thick undergrowth consisting of grasses, shrubs or ferns, and also grass and bamboo near the tree line. It is present in habitats disturbed by humans.

== Behaviour ==
The Taiwan bush warbler's behaviour is very similar to that of the russet bush warbler. The Taiwan bush warbler mostly sings in the morning and evening, starting in late March, and it has also been heard in winter. Its song is a repeated sequence of one monotone whistle and three or four clicks; the sequence is usually repeated more than ten times, ending with the whistle. This is unlike the nasal and metallic song of the russet bush warbler and the staccato song of the brown bush warbler. Calls include a scratchy ksh ksh ksh, a sharp tick and a stip. It breeds in May and June, and possibly as late as August. The nest is built in grass, and there are two eggs per clutch. The holotype specimen has insects in its stomach.

== Status ==
Considered to be common, this species is not regarded as threatened, and the IUCN has assessed it as a least-concern species.
