= Sakae Tamura (nature photographer) =

Japanese nature photographer

Shizen no katasumi de, a 1965 collection of photographs by Tamura, emphasizing the interest and beauty of the quotidian.

Sakae Tamura (田村 栄, Tamura Sakae; 1910–2003) was a Japanese magazine editor and photographer of nature.

Tamura was born in Chiba in 1910, but his family moved to Tokyo in 1924. Under the influence of his father, an amateur photographer, he started taking photographs in 1927.

Tamura worked from 1936 till 1973 in a succession of editorial posts, mostly preparing educational materials about nature. The first of these was within Kōgasha (光画社), where he worked on the photography magazine Gekkan Kogata Kamera (月刊小型カメラ). He subsequently moved to Seibundō Shinkōsha (誠文堂新光社), where he was the chief editor of the magazine of science for children Kodomo no Kagaku (子供の科学) and the astronomy magazine Tenmon Gaido (天文ガイド).

Tamura's book of photography of insects, showing the activities and life-cycles of insects, made him an innovator in Japan, where insect photography had previously been limited to unimaginative depictions of dead specimens.

Tamura won an award from the Ministry of Education in 1951 for the book Konchū no seitai.

Between 1954 and 1960, Tamura took many photographs of bird life, and the increasing threats to this, along the stretch of the Tama River between Tokyo and Kawasaki, increasingly polluted and with an increasing percentage of its banks used for group leisure pursuits. In a book-length anthology of these published in 1962, he pointed out the decrease in the variety of bird life, and warned of the danger of further increases to come. Photographs from the book were exhibited in the National Science Museum of Japan in 1963.

Tamura died in 2003.

== Books ==
- Tōdai no hanashi (灯台の話し). Tokyo: Tōa Shorin, 1943. A book for children.
- (in Japanese) Konchū no seitai: Raika shashinshū (昆虫の生態：ライカ写眞集) / Closeups on Insects. Tokyo: Seibundo-Shinkosha, 1951. Most of the text in Japanese only, but with terse captions in English as well.
- (in Japanese) Konchū (昆虫, Insects). Iwanami Shashin Bunko. Tokyo: Iwanami, 1953. A joint work.
- Tamagawa no tori (多摩川の鳥) / Birds of River Tama. Tokyo: Seibundo-Shinkosha, 1961. With captions and some text in English as well as Japanese.
- (in Japanese) Tamura Sakae shashinshū: Shizen no katasumi de (田村栄写真集：自然の片隅で, Sakae Tamura photograph collection: In the nooks of nature). Tokyo: Seibundo-Shinkosha, 1965. Photographs of plants, insects, reptiles and birds, as noticed often hidden away. Mostly black and white, some color.
- (in Japanese) Kamakura kaidō (鎌倉街道, The Kamakura road). Tokyo: Seibundo-Shinkosha, 1990. ISBN 4-416-89000-1. Color and black and white photographs of sights of nature along the Kamakura Kaidō, an ancient road.

== Sources ==
- Neichā wārudo: Chikyū ni ikiru (ネイチャー・ワールド：地球に生きる) / Nature World: Life on Earth. Tokyo: Tokyo Metropolitan Museum of Photography, 1997. Exhibition catalogue, with texts and captions in Japanese and English.
- Nihon no shashinka (日本の写真家) / Biographic Dictionary of Japanese Photography. Tokyo: Nichigai Associates, 2005. ISBN 4-8169-1948-1. (in Japanese) Despite the English-language alternative title, all in Japanese.
- Sekiji, Kazuko. “Nature World: Life on Earth.” 185–91. In Nature World: Life on Earth.
- Unno, Kazuo (海野和男). "Tamura Sakae: Konchū no seitai" (田村栄 昆虫の生態). Unno Kazuo no dejitaru konchūki (海野和男のデジタル昆虫記) / Kazuo Unno's Insects World of Digital. 14 December 2007. (in Japanese) Accessed 8 June 2008.
