= List of bird species described in the 2000s =

This page details the bird species described as new to science in the decade from 2000 to 2010:

== Summary statistics ==
=== Number of species described per year ===
Year	2000	2001	2002	2003	2004	2005	2006	2007	2008	2009
Number of new species described	5	8	6	3	6	6	5	6	7	5

Brazil, Colombia, Peru and Indonesia had the highest numbers of newly described species.

== Years ==
=== 2000 ===
- Foothill elaenia, Myiopagis olallai
- Caatinga antwren, Herpsilochmus sellowi
- Taiwan bush-warbler, Bradypterus alishanensis
- Scarlet-banded barbet or Wallace's scarlet-banded barbet, Capito wallacei
- Gunnison sage-grouse, Centrocercus minimus

==== Newly split species ====
- Gray-crested cacholote, Pseudoseisura unirufa, formerly included in the Caatinga cacholote

=== 2001 ===
- Bukidnon woodcock, Scolopax bukidnonensis, from Mindanao and Luzon, Philippines
- Mekong wagtail, Motacilla samveasnae
- Chestnut-eared laughingthrush, Garrulax konkakinhensis
- Chestnut-capped piha, Lipaugus weberi
- Chapada flycatcher, Suiriri islerorum, from the Cerrado region of Brazil and adjacent eastern Bolivia
- Mishana tyrannulet, Zimmerius villarejoi, from Amazonian white sand forests in northern Peru
- Lulu's tody-tyrant, Poecilotriccus luluae, from the north-eastern Andes in Peru
- Vanuatu petrel, Poecilotriccus luluae

=== 2002 ===
- Bald parrot, Pionopsitta aurantiocephala, from Brazil
- Cryptic forest falcon, Micrastur mintoni, from Brazil Note: This falcon was first reported in 2002; the name was not issued until the following year.
- Kimberley pipit, Anthus pseudosimilis (Motacillidae)
- Little Sumba boobook, Ninox sumbaensis, from Indonesia
- Madeira parakeet, Pyrrhura snethlageae, from the drainage of the Rio Madeira in Bolivia and Brazil. The scientific name of which honours Emilia Snethlage, who first recognized the distinctiveness of this form in 1914. It and the following are both part of the Pyrrhura picta complex.
- Carajas woodcreeper, Xiphocolaptes carajaensis

==== Newly split species ====
- Lafresnaye's woodcreeper, Xiphorhynchus guttatoides, formerly included in the buff-throated woodcreeper
- Elegant woodcreeper, X. elegans, formerly included in Spix's woodcreeper
- Tschudi's woodcreeper, X. chunchotambo, formerly included in the ocellated woodcreeper

=== 2003 ===
- Micrastur mintoni, (see above) first described in 2003
- Pernambuco pygmy owl, Glaucidium mooreorum, a critically endangered species of pygmy owl
- Carrizal seedeater, Amaurospiza carrizalensis, from Venezuela
- Munchique wood-wren, Henicorhina negreti, a member of the wren family (Troglodytidae). The bird is found on the Munchique Massif in the western Andes in the Chocó Endemic Bird Area of Colombia. The species' scientific name honours Alvaro José Negret, a Colombian conservationist. This is the first species to have been described as new to science on a website rather than in a traditional print-only journal.
- Okarito brown kiwi, Apteryx rowi, (also known as the rowi) is a member of the kiwi family (Apterygidae). The species is part of the brown kiwi complex, and is morphologically very similar to other members of that complex. It is found in a restricted area of the Ōkārito forest on the west coast of New Zealand's South Island, and has a population of only 200 birds.
- Xenoperdix udzungwensis obscurata This was originally described as a subspecies. Its status as a species separate from X. udzungwensis was recognised in 2005

=== 2004 ===
- Serendib scops-owl, Otus thilohoffmanni, a small, rufous owl (Strigidae) found in lowland rainforests in Sri Lanka. The new species was discovered in February 1995, when Deepal Warakagoda heard unfamiliar owl-like vocalisations, although it was not until January 2001, when Warakagoda saw the bird, that his suspicions were confirmed; other observers had suggested that an arboreal amphibian may have been the source of the noises. The name Serendib is an old name for Sri Lanka; the species' scientific name honours conservationist Thilo W. Hoffmann.:
- Togian hawk-owl, Ninox burhani, an owl (Strigidae). The bird is known only from three islands in the Togian group, an archipelago in the Gulf of Tomini off the coast of Sulawesi, Indonesia. The new species was discovered on 25 December 1999. The species' scientific name honours a local conservationist called Burhan.
- Rubeho akalat, Sheppardia aurantiithorax, a member of the Old World flycatcher family (Muscicapiidae), known from the Eastern Arc of Tanzania. Akalats trapped in 1989 were assumed to be an isolated population of the Iringa akalat which occurs about 150 km to the south, but further specimens collected in 2000 led to the description of the bird as a new species. The bird's English name relates to its type locality; the scientific name to the ochraceous colour on its throat and upper breast. The species is thought to be fairly common in montane forests within its small range.
- Acre antshrike, Thamnophilus divisorus, from Brazil
- Calayan rail, Gallirallus calayanensis, a member of the rail family (Rallidae) found only on Calayan Island, one of the Babuyan Islands in the Philippines. It was discovered in 2004 as part of a faunal survey. It is found in limestone forests on the island.
- Mees's nightjar, Caprimulgus meesi, a member of the nightjar family (Caprimulgidae). It is a representative of the large-tailed nightjar complex found on Flores and Sumba in Indonesia. Previously unrecognised as a separate taxon due to its lack of morphological distinctness, Sangster and Rozendaal described this new species on the basis of its vocalisations, which differ significantly from those of the large-tailed nightjar races resident on other islands in the Lesser Sundas. The species is named after Gerlof Mees, former curator of the Natural History Museum, Leiden.

=== 2005 ===
- Sulphur-breasted parakeet, Aratinga pintoi, (a member of the parrot family, Psittacidae) found along the northern bank of the lower River Amazon in Pára state, Brazil. The species' scientific name honours Oliverio Pinto, a Brazilian ornithologist. This species was discovered as a result of a study of museum specimens of sun parakeet and related species; specimens of this species had been dismissed as immature parakeets of other species, or hybrids.
- Upper Magdalena tapaculo, Scytalopus rodriguezi, (a member of the tapaculo family, Rhinocryptidae) a restricted-range endemic presently known only from two localities on the eastern slope of the Cordillera Central at the head of the Magdalena valley in Colombia at 2000 m or more above sea-level. Its range is believed to be no greater than 170 km^{2}, and its population around 2,200 pairs. It is found in humid forest with dense understorey. The species' scientific name honours José Vicente Rodriguez Mahecha, a Colombian conservationist. The existence of this species was first suspected in 1986, when a tape-recording of the bird's song was made, but political instability in the region prevented a return visit until 2002 and 2003, when the species' existence was confirmed.
- Stiles's tapaculo, Scytalopus stilesi, was the second member of the tapaculo family, Rhinocryptidae, to be newly described in 2005. It has been found at 21 sites in montane forest between 1,420 and 2,130 m altitude in the northern Cordillera Central of the Colombian Andes; although having a restricted range, within this limited area it is a common understorey bird. The species was originally observed in the 1990s, but when Niels Krabbe examined recordings of their songs, his suspicions arose that they were a new species – Stiles's tapaculo's song is considerably faster and lower-pitched than that of the closely related Ecuadorian tapaculo, S. robbinsi. The species is named in honour of F. Gary Stiles, an ornithologist heavily involved in research on Neotropical birds during the 1980s and 1990s.
- Iquitos gnatcatcher, Polioptila clementsi, a gnatcatcher (Polioptilidae) only known from the Allpahuayo-Mishana National Reserve, west of Iquitos, Peru. The species is a member of the Polioptila guianensis complex. It is named after James F. Clements.
- Naung Mung scimitar-babbler, Jabouilleia naungmungensis, from Myanmar
- Planalto tapaculo, Scytalopus pachecoi

=== 2006 ===
- Odedi, Cettia haddeni, a species in the Old World warbler family, described from the Crown Prince Range on the island of Bougainville in the Solomon Islands, Papua New Guinea.
- Camiguin hanging-parrot, Loriculus camiguinensis
- Hocking's conure, Aratinga hockingi
- Bugun liocichla, Liocichla bugunorum
- Yariguies brush finch, Atlapetes latinuchus yariguierum

=== 2007 ===
- Sincorá antwren, Formicivora grantsaui (Thamnophilidae)
- Gorgeted puffleg, Eriocnemis isabellae, hummingbird, Trochilidae The validity of this species was questioned briefly, but only until the strikingly plumed female became known.
- Rufous twistwing, Cnipodectes superrufus
- Antioquia brush-finch, Atlapetes blancae
- Diamantina tapaculo, Scytalopus diamantinensis
- Grey-crowned tyrannulet, Serpophaga griseicapilla
- Solomon Islands frogmouth, Rigidipenna inexpectata – split from marbled frogmouth

=== 2008 ===
- Nonggang babbler, Stachyris nonggangensis
- Yungas tyrannulet, Phyllomyias weedeni
- Olive-backed forest robin, Stiphrornis pyrrholaemus
- Monteiro's storm-petrel, Oceanodroma monteiroi
- Vanikoro white-eye, Zosterops gibbsi
- Togian white-eye, Zosterops somadikartai
- Amazon red-fronted parakeet, Pyrrhura parvifrons

=== 2009 ===
- Bare-faced bulbul, Pycnonotus hualon
- Rubeho warbler, Scepomycter rubehoensis
- South Hills crossbill, Loxia sinesciurus
- Río Orinoco spinetail, Synallaxis beverlyae
- Black-capped woodnymph, Thalurania nigricapilla

== Described in this period, no longer considered valid species ==
- Beijing flycatcher, Ficedula beijingnica (Zheng et al., 2000), now considered to be the first-year male of the green-backed flycatcher, Ficedula elisae
- Scytalopus notorius (Raposo et al., 2006), synonymous with the mouse-coloured tapaculo, Scytalopus speluncae
- Wavy-breasted parakeet, Pyrrhura peruviana, synonymous with the rose-fronted parakeet, Pyrrhura roseifrons

== See also ==
- List of bird species described in the 2010s
- List of bird species described in the 2020s
