= British Birdwatching Fair =

Annual event for birdwatchers

Coordinates: 52.656°N 0.702°W

BirdFair
- Founded: 1989; 37 years ago
- Type: Bird Festival
- Location: Egleton, Rutland
- Region served: birdwatching
- Website: www.birdfair.org.uk

The British Birdwatching Fair or Birdfair is an annual event for birdwatchers, held every August at Rutland Water in England, run by staff and volunteers from the Leicestershire and Rutland Wildlife Trust. The birdfairs in 2020 and 2021 were cancelled because of the COVID-19 pandemic and in November 2021 the fair was permanently discontinued over financial concerns. By January 2022, however, one of the original conceivers of the Birdfair, Tim Appleton MBE, announced a new event under the guise of 'Global BirdFair'. In March 2022 an official announcement was made that Global Birdfair would take place at a new location, Rutland Showground, from 15–17 July.

It has been described as "the birder's Glastonbury". A large number of suppliers of binoculars, cameras, books, clothing and other birdwatching equipment, plus artists and tour companies, display and sell their wares. There are also lectures and other attractions. The first fair was held in 1989. All the organisers' profits are donated to a charity, Birdlife International. Prior to the 2008 fair, visitors had contributed £1,488,000 to international bird conservation. The 2018 fair raised £322,000, making a total of £4,679,152 since the inception.

Other countries are replicating the fair, including the South American Bird Fair, which was first held in 2010 and the Amazon Birding Fest since 2019.

== Themes ==
Each year the Birdfair has a different fundraising theme; a list of these is as follows, with the approximate amount raised:

- 1989: Stop the Massacre Campaign, Malta (£3,000)
- 1990: Helping Save Spain's Doñana National Park (£10,000)
- 1991: Danube Delta (£20,000)
- 1992: Spanish Steppes Appeal (£30,000)
- 1993: Polish Wetlands (£40,000)
- 1994: Project Halmahera, Indonesia (£45,000)
- 1995: Moroccan Wetlands Project (£47,000)
- 1996: Kẻ Gỗ Nature Reserve Forest Project, Vietnam (£55,000)
- 1997: Mindo Important Bird Area Project, Ecuador (£60,000)
- 1998: Threatened Birds Programme (£120,000)
- 1999: Rescuing Brazil's Atlantic Forests (£130,000)
- 2000: Save the Albatross Campaign (£122,000)
- 2001: Eastern Cuba – Saving a Unique Caribbean Wilderness (£135,000)
- 2002: Saving the last Lowland Rainforests in Sumatra (£147,000)
- 2003: Saving Madagascar's Fragile Wetlands (£157,000)
- 2004: Saving Northern Peru's Dry Forests (£164,000)
- 2005: Saving Gurney's Pittas and their forest home (£200,000)
- 2006: Saving the Pacific's Parrots (£215,000)
- 2007: Preventing Extinctions programme (£226,000)
- 2008: Preventing Extinctions programme (£265,000)
- 2009: Preventing Extinctions programme (£263,000)
- 2010: Southern Ethiopian Endemics (£243,000)
- 2011: Flyways – The Eurasian-African Flyway (£227,000)
- 2012: Flyways – The East Asian-Australian Flyway (£200,000)
- 2013: Flyways – The Americas Flyway (£270,000)
- 2014: Protecting the Worlds Seas and Oceans (£280,000)
- 2015: Protecting Migratory Birds of the Eastern Mediterranean (£320,000)
- 2016: Saving IBAs in Africa (£350,000)
- 2017: Saving Paradise in the Pacific (Rapa Iti) (£333,000)
- 2018: Mar Chiquita: a haven for Argentina's flamingos (£322,000)
- 2019: Conserving Cambodia’s big five in Western Siem Pang (£155,000)
- 2020: The Birdfair was cancelled in 2020 because of the COVID-19 pandemic, with an online event to take place instead.
- 2021: Cancelled because of the COVID-19 pandemic.
- 2022: Global Birdfair announced at Rutland Showground 15–17 July 2022
