= List of bird species discovered since 1900 =

This article describes bird species discovered since 1900. Before the 20th century, and into its early decades, the pace of discovery (and "discovery") of new species was fast; during this period, with numerous collecting expeditions into species-rich areas not previously visited by western ornithologists, up to several hundred new species per decade were being described. Many of these were of course not new to the local people, but since then, the pace has slowed, and new species are generally only being found in remote areas, or among cryptic or secretive groups of species. Nonetheless, several tens of species were described for the first time even during the 1990s. Considerable time can pass between discovery and publication, for a number of reasons.

Individual countries particularly rich in species newly described during this period are:

- Brazil
- Colombia
- Peru
- Indonesia
- Philippines

A number of individuals have been particularly prolific in describing new species, such as:

- Niels Krabbe
- Paul Coopmans
- Bret Whitney

== Species described that were not valid species ==
A number of species described during this period have turned out not to be valid species. There are a number of reasons for this. The following is a list of these species:

- Cox's sandpiper, Calidris paramelanotos, in 1982, now known to be a stereotyped hybrid between males of the pectoral sandpiper and female curlew sandpipers.
- Bulo Burti boubou, Laniarius liberatus, from Somalia, in 1991, found to be a color morph of Laniarius nigerrimus.
- Kenyon's shag or Amchitka cormorant, Phalacrocorax kenyoni, in 1991, now considered to refer to small females of the pelagic cormorant.
- Mascarene shearwater, Puffinus atrodorsalis, in 1995, now considered indistinguishable from the tropical shearwater, Puffinus lherminieri bailloni (or P. bailloni bailloni)
- Brigida's woodcreeper, Hylexetastes brigidai, in 1997, now usually considered a subspecies of the red-billed woodcreeper pending thorough study.

== The Meise and AMNH reviews ==
During the 20th century, ornithologists published a number of periodic reviews of newly described species. The purpose of each of these was to collect together in a single paper, for ease of reference, all new species' descriptions published in the period of study, and to present an analysis of these, indicating which represent valid species, and which, for various reasons, do not.

The first such review was published in 1934, by the ornithologist Wilhelm Meise, covering the period 1920 to 1934. Meise presented his review to the Eighth International Ornithological Congress (IOC) in Oxford. The review listed 600 new species' names described in that period. Meise was of the opinion that between 135 and 200 represented good species. At the ninth IOC in 1938, Meise presented a second paper, listing 23 new species described in the intervening period, plus a further 36 which had been described during 1920–1934 and not covered in the earlier paper. Meise's papers were:

- Meise, W. (1934) Fortschritte der ornithologischen Systematik seit 1920 Proc. VIII Cong. Internat. Ornith. pp. 49–189
- Meise, W. (1938) Exposition de types d'oiseaux nouvellement décrits au Muséum de Paris Proc. IX Cong. Internat. Ornith. pp. 46–51

After the Second World War, ornithologists based at museums in the American Museum of Natural History produced further reviews; again, each of these listed newly described species and presented an analysis, indicating which were and were not good species. To date, six such papers have been compiled; they are, in chronological order:

- Zimmer, J. T. & E. Mayr; Mayr (1943). "New species of birds described from 1938 to 1941" (PDF). Auk. 60 (2): 249–262. doi:10.2307/4079651. JSTOR 4079651.
- Mayr, E. (1957). "New species of birds described from 1941 to 1955". Journal für Ornithologie. 98: 22–35. doi:10.1007/BF01677166. S2CID 45014054.
- Mayr, E. (1971). "New species of birds described from 1956 to 1965". J. Ornithol. 112 (3): 302–316. doi:10.1007/BF01640689. S2CID 245710.
- Mayr, E. & F. Vuilleumier; Vuilleumier (1983). "New species of birds described from 1966 to 1975". J. Ornithol. 124 (3): 217–232. doi:10.1007/BF01640607. S2CID 24273749.
- Vuilleumier, F. & E. Mayr; Mayr (1987). "New species of birds described from 1976 to 1980". J. Ornithol. 128 (2): 137–150. doi:10.1007/BF01661691. S2CID 27239055.
- Vuilleumier, François, Mary LeCroy & Ernst Mayr (1992). "New species of birds described from 1981 to 1990". Bulletin of the British Ornithologists' Club. 112A: 267–309.

No further detailed analyses have been published since the 1992 paper, although the British magazine Birding World has published two articles by Oscar van Rootselaar listing newly described species since 1990:

- van Rootselaar, Oscar (1999). "New birds for the World: species discovered during 1980 – 1999". Birding World. 12: 286–293.
- van Rootselaar, Oscar (2002). "New birds for the World: species described during 1999 – 2002". Birding World. 15: 428–431.

== Discoveries by year ==
=== 1964 ===
- Barau's petrel, Pterodroma baraui

=== 1973 ===
- †Poʻo-uli, Melamprosops phaeosoma (now extinct)

=== 1981 ===
- Chubut steamerduck, Tachyeres leucocephalus
- Okinawa rail, Gallirallus okinawae
- Yellow-footed honeyguide, Melignomon eisentrauti

=== 1982 ===
- Somali lark, Mirafra ashi
- Malurus campbelli
- Ploceus ruweti
- Vidua raricola
- Vidua larvaticola

=== 1983 ===
- †Alagoas foliage-gleaner, Philydor novaesi (now extinct)
- Amsterdam albatross, Diomedea amsterdamensis
- Glaucidium albertinum
- Gerygone ruficauda
- Nectarinia rufipennis
- Eungella honeyeater, Lichenostomus hindwoodi

=== 1984 ===
- West African batis

=== 1985 ===
- Red Sea swallow, Hirundo perdita
- Phyllastrephus leucolepis

=== 1986 ===
- Ash-throated antwren, Herpsilochmus parkeri
- Ploceus victoriae

=== 1987 ===
- Cettia carolinae

=== 1991 ===
- Roviana rail, Gallirallus rovianae from Roviana, Solomon Islands

=== 1995 ===
- Sichuan treecreeper

=== 1997 ===
- Lina's sunbird, Aethopyga linaraborae, from Mindanao, Philippines
- Red-shouldered vanga, Calicalicus rufocarpalis
- Javan frogmouth, Batrachostomus pygmeus

=== 1998 ===
- Araripe manakin, Antilophia bokermanni
- Sangihe scops owl, Otus collari

=== 1999 ===
- Jocotoco antpitta, Grallaria ridgelyi, from Ecuador

=== 2000s ===
See Bird species new to science described in the 2000s.

=== 2010s ===
See Bird species described in the 2010s.

=== 2020s ===
See Bird species described in the 2020s.
