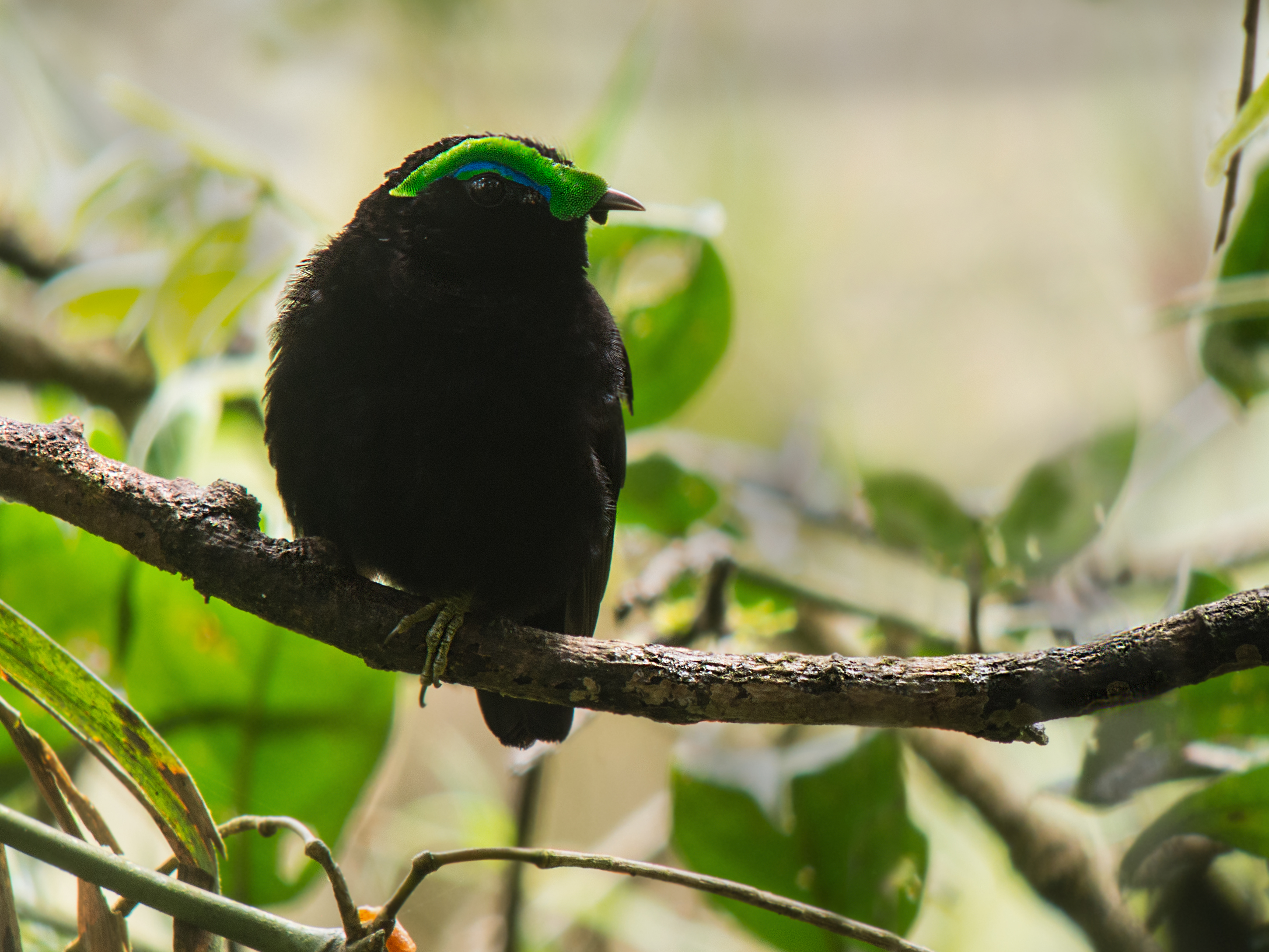
- Adult breeding male
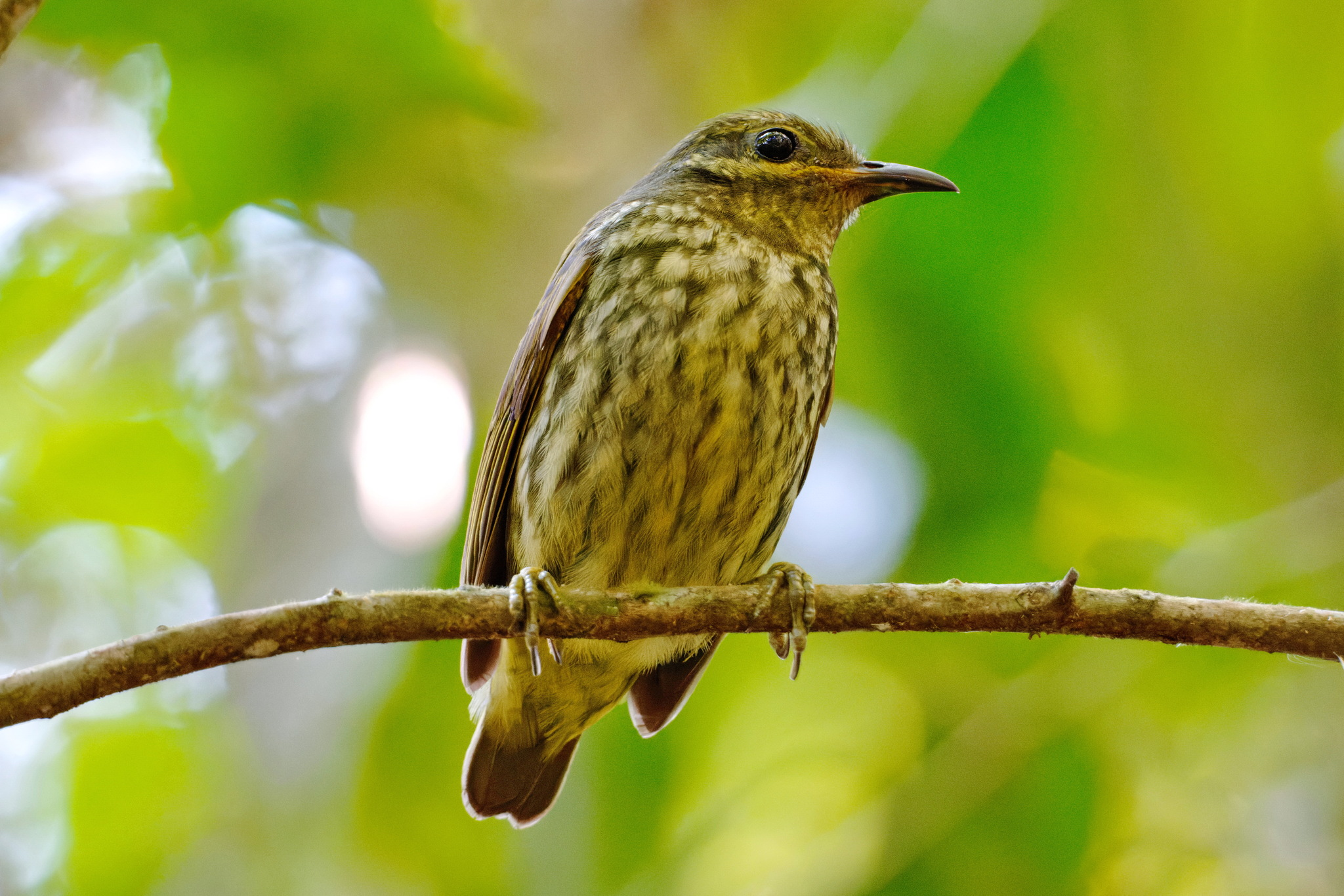
- Adult female

Conservation status
- Least Concern (IUCN 3.1)

Scientific classification
- Kingdom: Animalia
- Phylum: Chordata
- Class: Aves
- Order: Passeriformes
- Family: Philepittidae
- Genus: Philepitta
- Species: P. castanea

Binomial name
- Philepitta castanea (Müller, 1776)

= Velvet asity =

Species of bird

The velvet asity (Philepitta castanea) is a bird species in the family Philepittidae that is endemic to Madagascar. Its natural habitat is subtropical or tropical moist lowland forests. Non-breeding males have yellow-tipped feathers, while breeding males have a velvety black plumage with a pair of green fleshy supraorbital caruncles above the eyes. Adult females are greenish and have underparts striped with pale yellow-green longitudinal lines. Velvet asities eat berries and other fruits in the undergrowth. They build hanging nests with a little roof over the entrance. The species is listed as “Least Concern” on the IUCN Red List.

== Taxonomy ==
The velvet asity is a member of a monophyletic group within the order Passeriformes and the family Philepittidae. Philepittidae was originally considered a distinct and isolated family within the suboscine passerines. However, phylogenetic analysis revealed that asities were closely related to the Old World broadbills (family Eurylaimidae).

Within Philepittidae, two genera are currently recognized: Philepitta and Neodrepanis. Philepitta and Neodrepanis comprise four species of asities, all of which are endemic to Madagascar. The genus Philepitta includes the velvet asity and the Schlegel’s asity (Philepitta schlegeli), while Neodrepanis contains the common sunbird-asity (Neodrepanis coruscans) and the yellow-bellied sunbird-asity (Neodrepanis hypoxantha). Philepitta asities are mainly frugivores and have short, slightly decurved bills. In comparison, Neodrepanis sunbird-asities are nectarivores and possess a long decurved bill adapted to their diet.

== Description ==
The velvet asity has a minimum longevity of about 7 years. Its body is small and plump, measuring ~14–16.5 cm in length and weighing ~38.9 g. The tail (~42.5 mm) and wings (~82.1 mm) are rounded and short. The bill is slightly decurved and narrow, measuring ~18.1 mm in length and ~6.0 mm in width. The legs are relatively short.

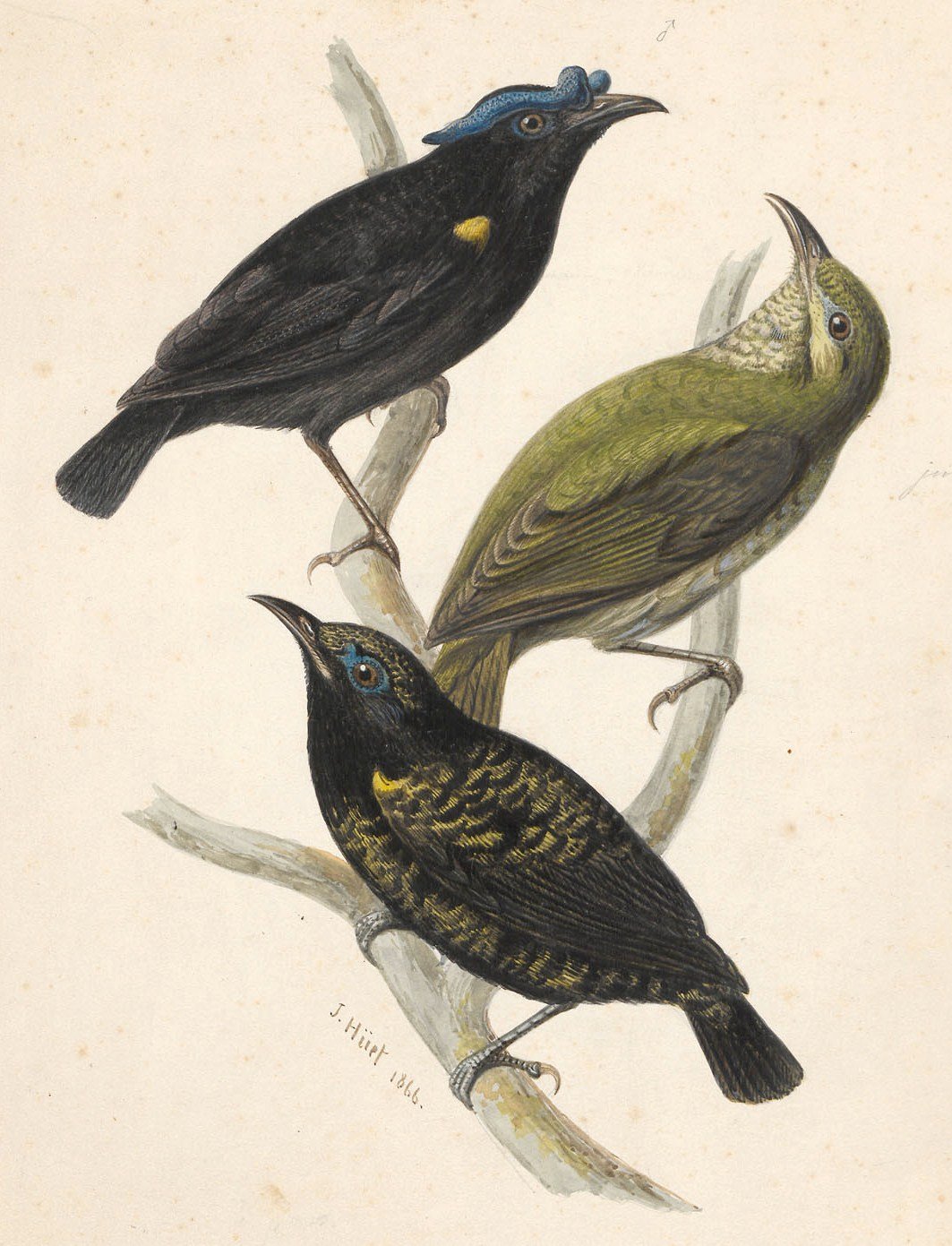
Top: adult breeding male, middle: adult female, bottom: adult non-breeding male

The morphology of the velvet asity is not suited for strong or sustained flight because of its poor wing structure and chunky body. Instead, it is well adapted for perch foraging, where its short and narrow bill allows it to easily pick fruit from a perch.

=== Sexual dimorphism ===
The male and female velvet asity are both similar in size but strongly sexually dimorphic.

The adult female has dull green upperparts with brown-olive wings and tail. Its underparts are dark olive and marked with pale yellow-green longitudinal stripes. The ear-coverts are dark olive green, with a creamy stripe that extends from the base of the bill. The bill is black and the eyes are dark brown. Juveniles are similar in appearance to adult females.

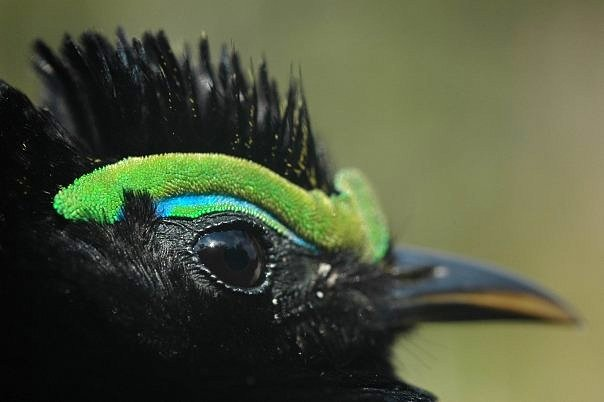
Supraorbital caruncles of an adult breeding male velvet asity

When newly molted, non-breeding males have a black throat, with most feathers tipped in olive-green, especially on the wings, breast, and belly. During the breeding season, the green tips disappear, and the feathers turn velvety black. Breeding males also develop a yellow spot on the edge of the underwing-coverts and alula, though it is not noticeable when the male is perched. Additionally, breeding males have a pair of bright green, fleshy supraorbital caruncles above the eyes, marked with a narrow blue line only visible when the caruncles are raised. The size and shape of the caruncles at rest vary between individual males.

== Distribution and habitat ==
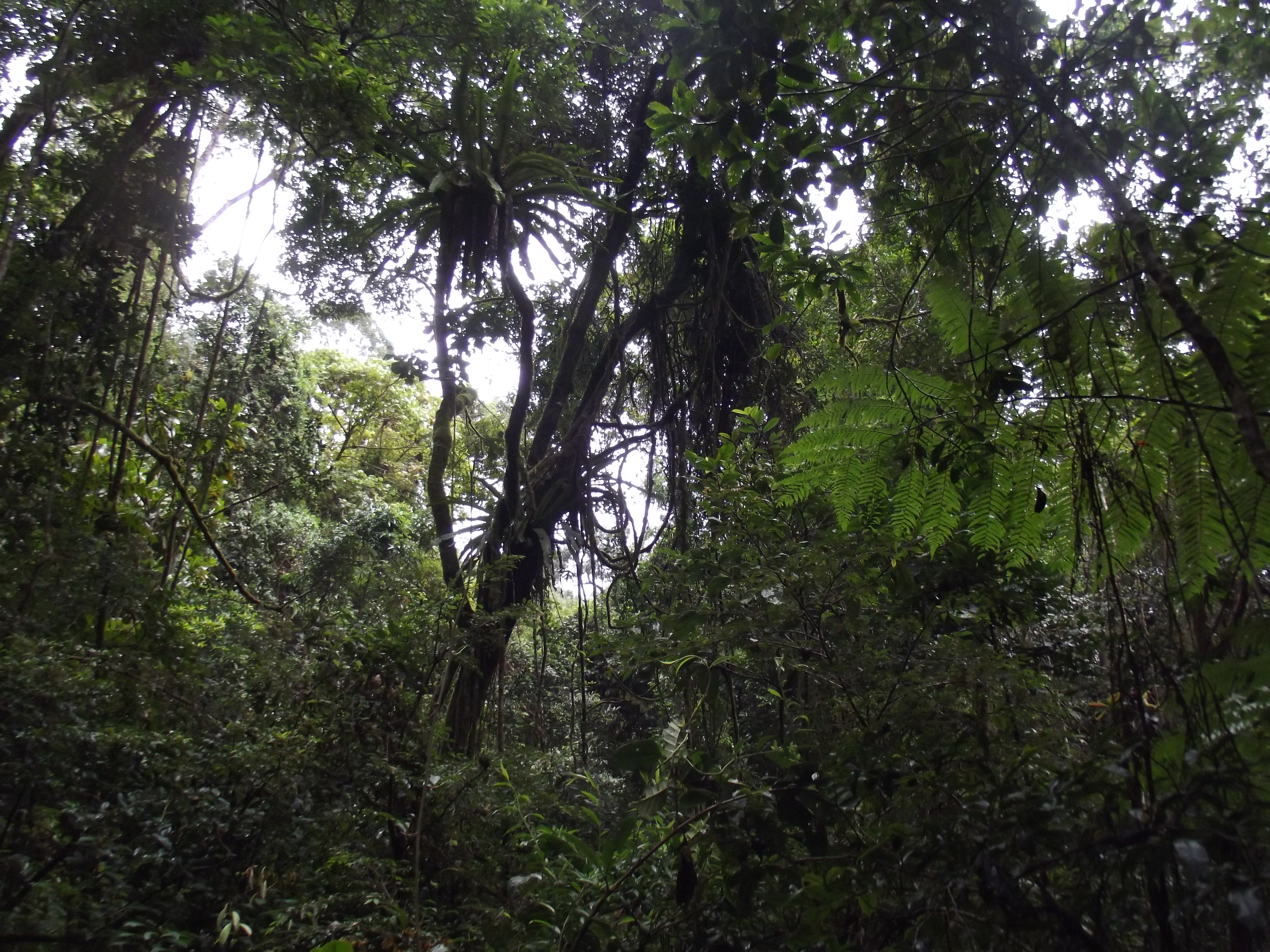
Ranomafana National Park

The velvet asity is endemic to Madagascar and is distributed along the eastern side and northwestern corner of the island, between sea level and altitudes of 1,800 m. It is commonly found in Ranomafana National Park (southeastern Madagascar) and the mountainous rainforests of Masoala National Park (northeastern Madagascar).

Velvet asities live in subtropical or tropical moist lowland forests. More specifically, they inhabit primary and secondary rainforests, as well as forested areas bordering zones affected by human disturbance (adjacent degraded rainforests). The species tends to favor locations with an open understory, especially along valley sides and bottoms. It has been recorded at both low and mid-elevations, but is most commonly found between 600 and 1,400 m. It is uncommon below 400 m and above 1,600 m, and is absent from montane sclerophyllous forests.

== Behaviour ==
=== Vocalization ===
Males produce a high-pitched advertisement call, consisting of a pair or short series of “whee-doo” with an emphasis on the first syllable. A “whee-doo” phrase typically has an initial note that increases from 5.5–6.3 kHz over 100 ms, followed by a 50 ms pause, and a final note that decreases from 5.4–4.8 kHz over 150–190 ms. While interacting with each other, males give a series of long, energetic call notes “weet”. Each “weet” note rises from 1–3 kHz over 80 ms from between 5.5–6.3 kHz to 7.4–8.2 kHz. Territorial males also emit high-pitched "see" calls during interactions, although these calls are rare, as they vocalize infrequently.

=== Diet ===
The velvet asity is the only frugivorous bird species feeding in understory shrubs in Madagascar’s rainforests. It consumes small fleshy fruits (5–10 mm in diameter) that typically contain one or two seeds. Fruits eaten are mostly red and orange in colour, but they can also be yellow, white, dark blue, or black. The velvet asity picks fruit while perched or in mid-air during a brief hover.

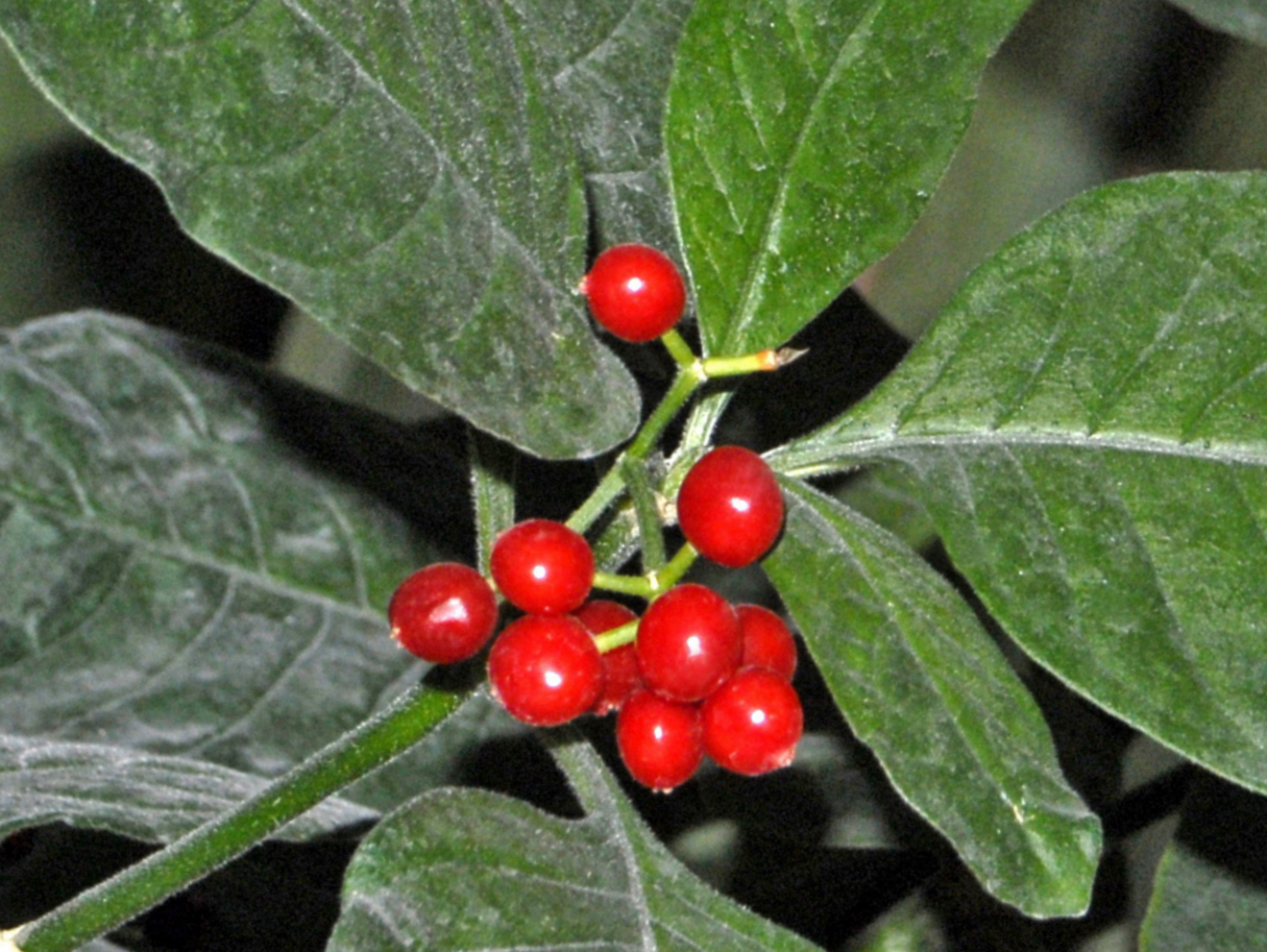
Psychotria sp. (Rubiaceae)

Since the species eats a wide variety of fruiting plants, it is considered a generalist forager. Key plant families in its diet include Rubiaceae, Myrsinaceae, Euphorbiaceae, Piperaceae, and Melastomataceae. Plants belonging to the genera Oncostemum, Psychotria, Jasminum, Macaranga, Pittosporum, and Chassalia are also important food sources. Fruits brought to nestlings are mainly from Tambourissa spp. and Aphloia theiformis shrubs.

Small seeds are defecated (1–2 mm in diameter) while larger seeds are usually regurgitated. This process contributes to the seed dispersal of shrubs, which is essential to support the regeneration of Madagascar's rainforests.

Seasonally, the velvet asity feeds on nectar, particularly from terrestrial and shrub-layer plants such as Bakerella. It can also occasionally consume arthropods (spiders and caterpillars).

=== Reproduction ===
==== Display ====
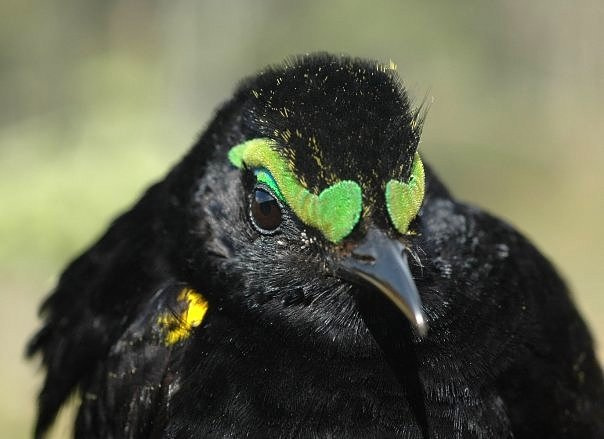
Yellow spot on the edge of the underwing-coverts and alula of an adult breeding male velvet asity

Males form dispersed leks, where each holds a small territory used for display. To courtship females, they perform the erect posture and the wing-flap pump display. In the erect posture, the male elongates its neck and body, leans forward over a perch, and erects its bright green supraorbital caruncles, revealing a vivid blue horizontal stripe above the eye. The wing-flap pump display begins with the male maintaining the erect posture for 1–2 seconds and rapidly leaning forward into a horizontal position over the perch. It then pumps its body upward by fully extending its neck and briefly returns to the erect posture. This is followed by a second vertical pump, during which the male simultaneously opens and closes its wings, revealing a yellow spot on the edge of the underwing-coverts and alula, which is clearly visible against the bird’s otherwise dark profile.

During interactions with rival males, additional displays are performed, including the horizontal posture, open gape display, hanging gape display, and perch-somersault display. In the horizontal posture, the male adopts a sleek, elongated, and horizontal stance on the perch, typically in response to hearing another male’s call. During the open gape display, the male perches with its head tucked in and mouth wide open, either silently or while giving a series of strong, energetic calls. In the hanging gape display, the male transitions from the open gape posture by suddenly lunging forward and downward with a distinct wing movement, then hangs from the perch for several seconds. The perch-somersault display appears to begin as a hanging gape display, but instead of hanging, the male rotates around the perch to return to the open gape posture. Most of the time, the open gape and hanging gape displays are performed between competitive males.

==== Nesting and fledging care ====
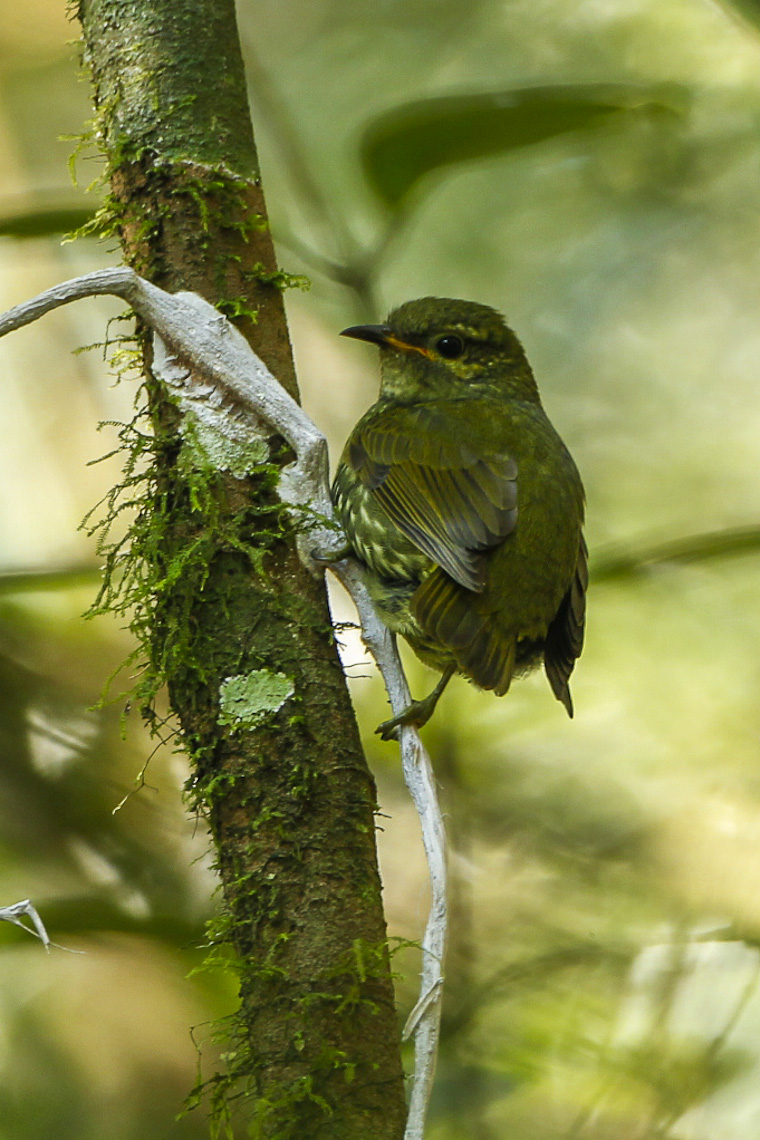
Adult female velvet asity in Ranomafana, Madagascar

Although research findings vary, most studies suggest that velvet asities are polygynous, with females solely responsible for nest building, incubation, and post-hatching care. Males typically play little to no role in raising the young.

Breeding has been recorded between November and February at Ranomafana. Nest building may take more than ten days. The nests are pear-shaped and suspended from the tips of hanging branches, typically 2 to 5 meters above the ground. They feature a small overhanging roof above the entrance and are covered with moss, bamboo fibers, and grass filaments, with the interior lined with twigs and dried leaves.

Egg-laying occurs between September and December, with the female laying three white eggs. She incubates the clutch for at least 13 days, and after hatching, continues to brood and feed the chicks. Nestlings are fed with regurgitated fruit pulp and fledge approximately 17 days after hatching.

== Conservation status ==
The velvet asity is not globally threatened and found in all protected areas within its range, including Ranomafana, Andringitra and Andohahela National Parks, Anjanaharibe-sud Special Reserve, and Perinet Special Reserve. The species is listed as “Least Concern” on the IUCN Red List due to its large range and relatively stable population. Although the population trend appears to be decreasing due to habitat loss, the rate of decline is believed to be too slow to raise concern. The population size has yet to be quantified, but it is thought to be above the threshold that would qualify the species as “Vulnerable”.
