= Barred woodcreeper =

There are two species of bird named barred woodcreeper.

- Northern barred woodcreeper, Dendrocolaptes sanctithomae
- Amazonian barred woodcreeper, Dendrocolaptes certhia
