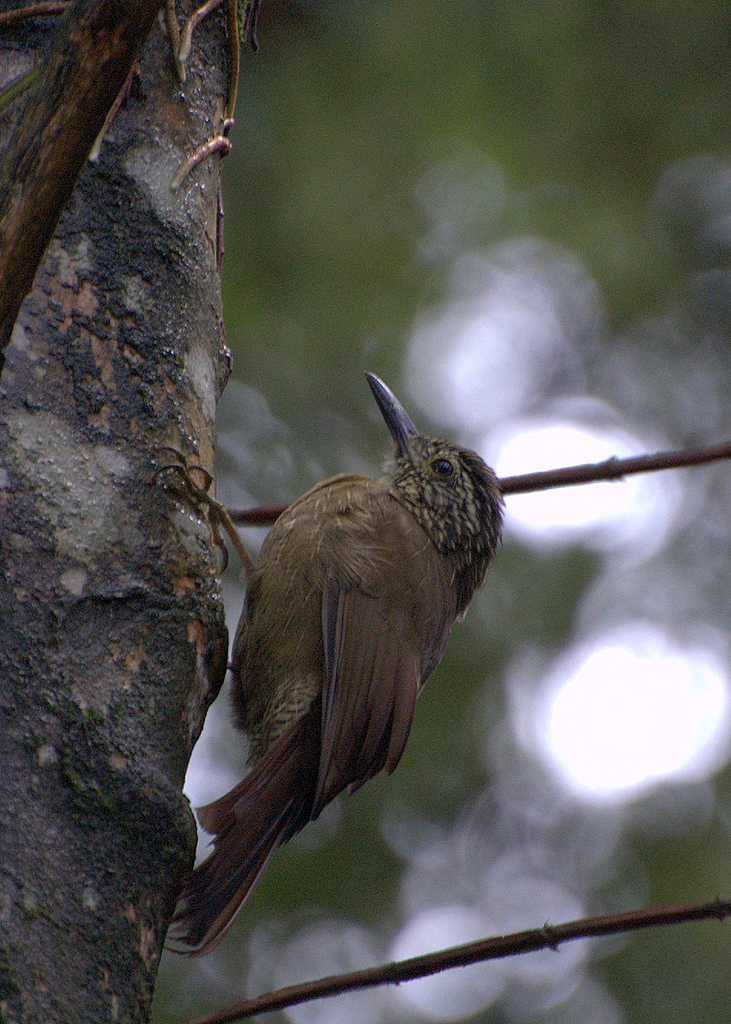

Conservation status
- Least Concern (IUCN 3.1)]

Scientific classification
- Kingdom: Animalia
- Phylum: Chordata
- Class: Aves
- Order: Passeriformes
- Family: Furnariidae
- Genus: Dendrocolaptes
- Species: D. platyrostris

Binomial name
- Dendrocolaptes platyrostris Spix, 1824

= Planalto woodcreeper =

Species of bird

The planalto woodcreeper (Dendrocolaptes platyrostris) is a sub-oscine passerine bird in subfamily Dendrocolaptinae of the ovenbird family Furnariidae. It is found in Argentina, Brazil, Paraguay, and Uruguay.

== Taxonomy and systematics ==
The planalto woodcreeper is most closely related to the black-banded woodcreeper (D. picumnus) and Hoffmanns's woodcreeper (D. hoffmannsi) and several authors have suggested that they are conspecific. It has two subspecies, the nominate D. p. platyrostris (Spix, 1824) and D. p. intermedius (Berlepsch, 1883). At least one work has suggested that vocal differences between them warrant their treatment as separate species, but later work does not support that separation.

== Description ==
The planalto woodcreeper is one of the larger members of its subfamily. It is slim, with a long tail and a medium-length straight bill. It is 25 to 27 cm (9.8 to 11 in) long and weighs 43 to 69 g (1.5 to 2.4 oz). The sexes have the same plumage. Adults of the nominate subspecies have a dusky face with bold buffy streaks and a faint supercilium. Their forehead, crown, and nape are black with bold buff streaks on the crown and nape. Their back and rump are olive-brown with thin buff streaks. Their wings, uppertail coverts, and tail are dull chestnut, with dusky tips on the primaries. Their throat is whitish with faint streaking and mottling. Their breast is olive-brown with strong whitish buff streaks. Their belly, flanks, and undertail coverts are buffy brown with thin blackish bars. Their iris is brown, their bill black with sometimes a paler tip to the mandible, and their legs and feet greenish gray to black. Subspecies D. p. intermedius is paler than the nominate with a more cinnamon color overall, a dusky brown or olive crown, few or no streaks on the back, and more rufous wings, rump, and tail. The two subspecies' plumages intergrade in their contact zone.

== Distribution and habitat ==
The nominate subspecies of the planalto woodcreeper is the more southerly of the two. It is found in eastern and southeastern Brazil from Bahia and Minas Gerais south through Rio Grande do Sul into northeastern Argentina as far as eastern Corrientes Province and very slightly into northeastern Uruguay. Subspecies D. p. intermedius is found further north and west, in northeastern, central, and south central Brazil from southeastern Pará south to Mato Grosso do Sul and eastern Paraguay. Both subspecies range east to the Atlantic coast.

The planalto woodcreeper inhabits a variety of wooded landscapes. The nominate subspecies is mostly found in humid lowland and montane forests. D. p. intermedius occurs in dryer habitats such as deciduous woodland, palm swamps, and gallery forest in relatively open caatinga and cerrado. The species favors the interior of primary forest but also occurs at its edges and in mature secondary forest.

== Behavior ==
=== Movement ===
The planalto woodcreeper is a year-round resident throughout its range.

=== Feeding ===
The planalto woodcreeper's diet is mostly arthropods but also includes small vertebrates such as frogs and a small amount of vegetable matter. It often follows army ant swarms and joins mixed-species feeding flocks. When attending ant swarms it perches low to the ground and sallies to capture prey. Away from ants it forages at all levels of the forest both by sallies from a perch and by gleaning from foliage and bark.

=== Breeding ===
The planalto woodcreeper's breeding season appears to vary somewhat geographically but generally is within October to January. It usually nests in natural cavities that it adds bark chips to, but has also been noted using nest boxes. The clutch size is three or four eggs. The incubation period is 14 to 16 days and fledging occurs 16 to 18 days after hatch.

=== Vocalization ===
The planalto woodcreeper mostly sings at dawn and dusk. The song of the nominate subspecies is a series of "relatively shrill 'whik', 'week' or 'chree' notes" that fade towards the end. That of D. p. intermedius is "a shorter series of 'yourit' or 'urit' notes". Both subspecies make calls that include "rattling, a grunting 'i-i-i', and other 'squirrel-like' grunts."

== Status ==
The IUCN has assessed the planalto woodcreeper as being of Least Concern. It has a very large range, and though its population size is not known it is believed to be stable. No immediate threats have been identified. It is considered uncommon to fairly common in most of its range. It is thought "only moderately sensitive to human disturbance, which may explain continued presence at many somewhat degraded sites."
