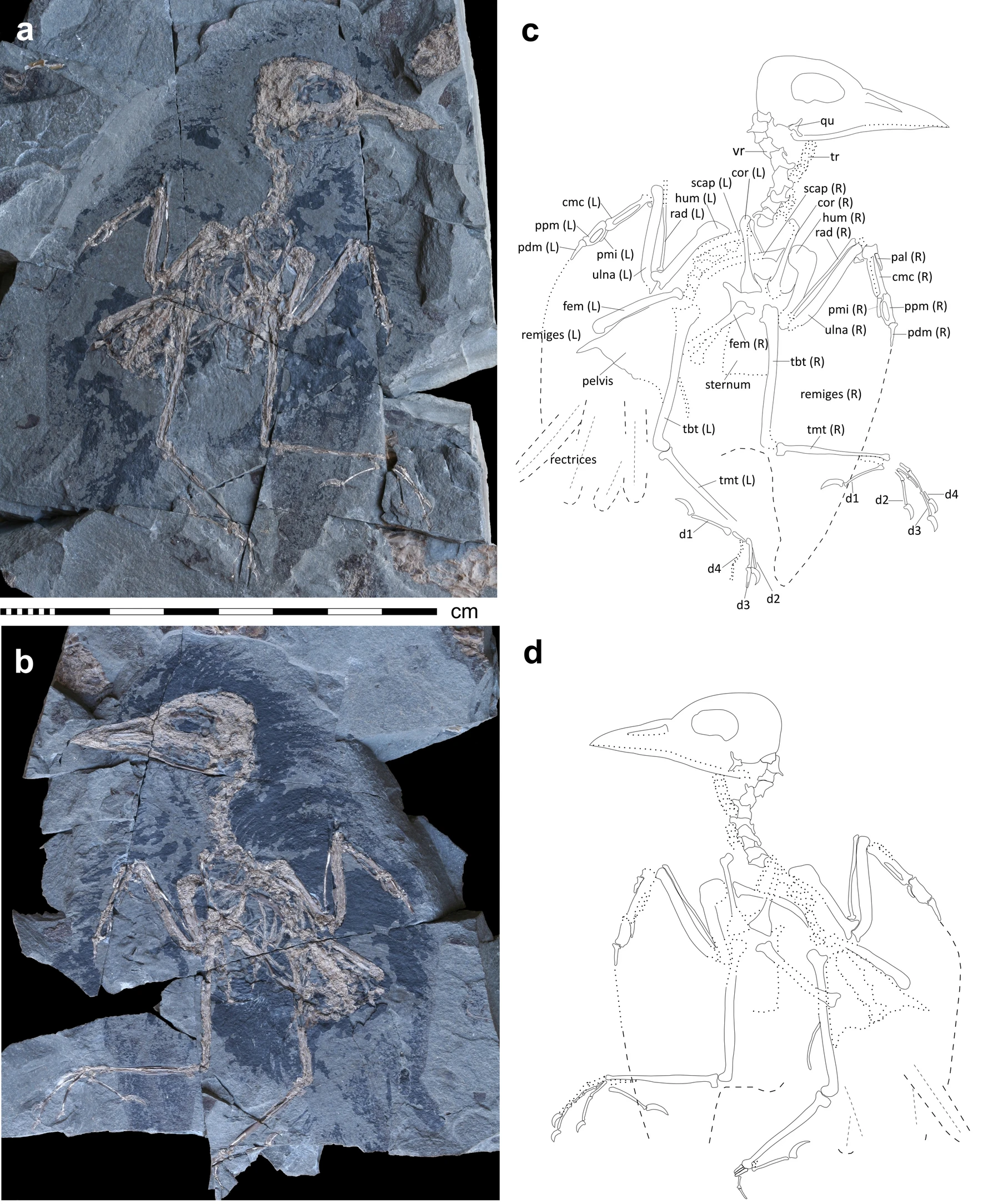
- Holotype

Scientific classification
- Kingdom: Animalia
- Phylum: Chordata
- Class: Aves
- Order: Passeriformes
- Clade: Eupasseres
- Suborder: Tyranni
- Genus: †Crosnoornis; Bochenski et al., 2021

Type species
- †Crosnoornis nargizia Bochenski et al., 2021

= Crosnoornis =

Crosnoornis Temporal range: Rupelian

Extinct genus of birds

Crosnoornis is an extinct genus of suboscine bird from the Early Oligocene of Poland. It contains a single species, C. nargizia. A 2024 study found strong support for it and the related Wieslochia being members of the suborder Tyranni, either as stem group or crown group members of the Eurylaimides.

== See also ==
- Jamninkaornis – another extinct member of the Tyranni
