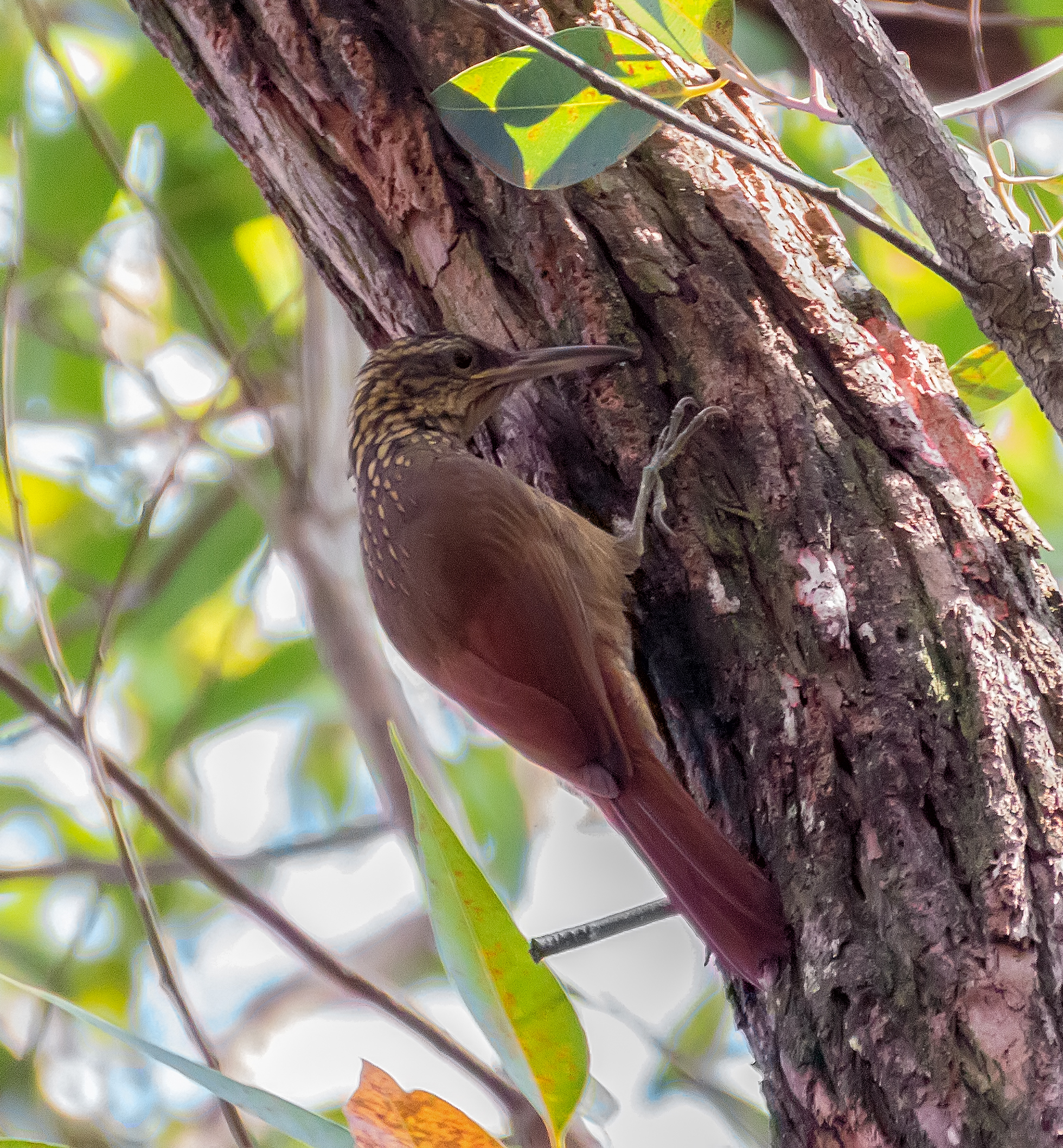

Conservation status
- Least Concern (IUCN 3.1)

Scientific classification
- Kingdom: Animalia
- Phylum: Chordata
- Class: Aves
- Order: Passeriformes
- Family: Furnariidae
- Genus: Dendrocolaptes
- Species: D. picumnus

Binomial name
- Dendrocolaptes picumnus Lichtenstein, MHC, 1820

= Black-banded woodcreeper =

Species of bird

The black-banded woodcreeper (Dendrocolaptes picumnus) is a sub-oscine passerine bird in subfamily Dendrocolaptinae of the ovenbird family Furnariidae. It is found discontinuously from Chiapas, Mexico, to Panama and in every mainland South American country except Chile and Uruguay.

== Taxonomy and systematics ==
The black-banded woodcreeper's taxonomy is unsettled. The International Ornithological Committee (IOC) and the Clements taxonomy recognize these 10 subspecies. Clements arranges them in three groups.

"Spot-throated" group

- D. p. puncticollis Sclater, PL & Salvin, 1868
- D. p. seilerni Hartert, EJO & Goodson, 1917
- D. p. olivaceus Zimmer, JT, 1934

"Black-banded" group

- D. p. costaricensis Ridgway, 1909
- D. p. multistrigatus Eyton, 1851
- D. p. validus Tschudi, 1844
- D. p. picumnus Lichtenstein, MHC, 1820
- D. p. transfasciatus Todd, 1925

"Pale-billed" group

- D. p. pallescens Pelzeln, 1868
- D. p. casaresi Steullet & Deautier, 1950

BirdLife International's Handbook of the Birds of the World (HBW) does not recognize D. p. casaresi, apparently including it within D. p. pallescens.

Subspecies D. p. transfasciatus and D. p. pallescens were each treated as separate species by some early 20th century authors but have been included in D. picumnus since about the middle of that century. D. p. transfasciatus is also sometimes proposed as a separate species. Further splits of the current 10 subspecies have been proposed but not accepted.

The black-banded woodcreeper's closest relatives are Hoffmanns's woodcreeper (D. hoffmannsi) and the planalto woodcreeper (D. platyrostris). Several authors have suggested that the three are conspecific. Others have suggested that D. p. pallescens is a species with D. hoffmannsi as a subspecies. Early 21st century publications posit that the black-banded woodcreeper should be split into at least two species that are paraphyletic with respect to D. hoffmannsi and D. platyrostris.

This article follows the 10-subspecies model.

== Description ==
The black-banded woodcreeper is one of the larger members of its subfamily. It is slim, with a long tail and a medium-length straight bill. It is 24 to 30.5 cm (9.4 to 12 in) long. Males weigh 47 to 89 g (1.7 to 3.1 oz) and females 48 to 98 g (1.7 to 3.5 oz). The sexes have the same plumage. Adults of the nominate subspecies D. p. picumnus have a dusky face and neck with buffy to tawny streaks and a faint supercilium and eyering. Their forehead, crown, and nape are dark brown; the crown and nape have buff to tawny streaks. Their back, scapulars and wing coverts are olive-brown; their back has fine pale streaks and faint dark bars and the coverts have pale streaks and dark bands near their ends. Their rump, wings, and tail are rufous-chestnut with dusky tips on the primaries. Their throat is whitish to deep buff with faint streaks or mottling. Their breast is olive-brown with bold buff streaks and an underlayment of spots or bars. Their belly, flanks, and undertail coverts are buffy brown with strong black bars and their underwing coverts are brighter buffy brown with blackish bars. Their iris is dark brown, their bill black with lighter edges and base to the mandible, and their legs and feet brown to greenish gray. Juveniles are similar to adults but fluffier, with bolder streaks and bars on the upperparts, weaker barring on the underparts, and a darker crown that is more spotted than streaked.

The other subspecies differ from the nominate and each other thus:

- D. p. puncticollis, blackish crown with fine streaks, narrow streaks on otherwise clear breast, fewer bars on belly
- D. p. seilerni, compared to puncticollis, browner crown, more streaking on breast
- D. p. olivaceus, like seilerni but more olivaceous underparts, lighter brown crown, stronger streaks on back, buffier streaks on crown and breast
- D. p. multistrigatus, smaller, fainter streaks above, finer bars below, more but narrower streaks on breast
- D. p. costaricensis, like multistrigatus with more bars and spots and fewer streaks on underparts
- D. p. validus, no barring on upperparts or breast, brownish maxilla and paler mandible
- D. p. transfasciatus, blackish crown, bold golden streaks above and white streaks below, weak barring on back and wing coverts, spotted rather than barred belly
- D. p. pallescens, crown and breast more rufescent with little or no streaking, rest of underparts bright rusty to plain brown, indistinct bars on belly, pale olive to bluish horn bill
- D. p. casaresi, like pallescens but slightly larger with a longer bill

== Distribution and habitat ==
The subspecies of the black-banded woodcreeper are found thus:

"Spot-throated" group

- D. p. puncticollis, spottily in highlands of Chiapas, central Guatemala, Honduras, and north-central Nicaragua
- D. p. seilerni, foothills and highlands of northern Colombia's Sierra Nevada de Santa Marta and the Venezuelan Coastal Range
- D. p. olivaceus, eastern foothills of the central Bolivian Andes

"Black-banded" group

- D. p. costaricensis, highlands of central and southeastern Costa Rica and the Pacific slope of western Panama
- D. p. multistrigatus, the Andes and Sierra de Perijá of Colombia; northwestern and western Venezuela
- D. p. validus, western Amazon Basin in southeastern Colombia, eastern Ecuador and Peru, northern Bolivia, and western Brazil east to the Rio Negro and Rio Madeira and south to Mato Grosso
- D. p. picumnus, northern Amazon Basin of southern and eastern Venezuela, the Guianas, and northern Brazil between the Rio Negro and the Atlantic Ocean in Amapá state
- D. p. transfasciatus, lower Amazon Basin of Brazil between the Rio Tapajós and Rio Xingu and south to Mato Grosso

"Pale-billed" group

- D. p. pallescens, the Gran Chaco of eastern Bolivia, southern Brazil, and western Paraguay
- D. p. casaresi, Andean foothills in northwestern Argentina's Jujuy, Salta, and Tucumán provinces

The black-banded woodcreeper inhabits a very wide variety of forested landscapes. In the lowlands of the Amazon basin, it mostly occurs in terra firme and floodplain forest, and less often in flooded forests and those on sandy soil and in savanna. The population in Mexico and northern Central America favors pine and pine-oak woodlands. Other populations are found in dry and humid deciduous and semi-deciduous forests, humid evergreen forest, and cloudforest. It mostly occurs in the interior of mature primary forest but also on its edges and in mature secondary forest. It rarely occurs in plantations. In elevation it ranges between 1,000 and 3,000 m (3,300 and 9,800 ft) in Mexico, from 750 to 2,900 m (2,500 to 9,500 ft) in northern Central America, from 500 to 2,000 m (1,600 to 6,600 ft) in Costa Rica and Panama, up to 2,700 m (8,900 ft) in Colombia and Venezuela, mostly below 1,500 m (4,900 ft) in Ecuador, and up to 1,300 m (4,300 ft) in Peru.

== Behavior ==
=== Movement ===
The black-banded woodcreeper is a year-round resident in most of its range, though in the north it might move from higher to lower elevation after breeding.

=== Feeding ===
The black-banded woodcreeper's diet is mostly arthropods including insects, spiders, scorpions, and centipedes, and also includes small vertebrates like lizards and sometimes frogs. Amazonian populations forage mostly by following army ant swarms to feed on prey disturbed by the ants. They also regularly forage alone and sometimes as part of a mixed-species feeding flock. Populations in mountainous areas follow ants much less than do the lowland birds. Ant followers tend to perch on a vertical trunk or branch fairly near the ground and sally from it to pick prey from the ground, trunks and branches, foliage, and epiphytes. Away from ants, birds forage at any forest level up to the sub-canopy.

=== Breeding ===
The black-banded woodcreeper's nesting season varies geographically, for instance in May and June in Venezuela, March to May in Guyana, and including September in northeastern Brazil. It nests in a tree cavity, either natural or excavated by a woodpecker. The clutch size is two eggs; the incubation period and time to fledging are not known. The species remains paired through the year and both parents incubate the clutch and care for nestlings.

=== Vocalization ===
The black-banded woodcreeper sings mostly at dawn and dusk, and only rarely during the day. Birds in Amazonia sing "a loud series...of 15–20 rapidly delivered liquid notes, usually on same pitch, sometimes falling away at end, 'kie-ie-ie--…ie-ee-eu-eu-er', 'glü glü glü glü glü' or 'whi-whi-whiwhiwhi'." Those in Mexico sing a "high-pitched, descending chatter". In northern Central America, the song is "a slow rolling laughter...'teu-teu-TEU-TEU-TEE-TEE-TEE-TEE-tee-tee-teu-teu-teu'." The species has a wide variety of calls: "short whinny, nasal 'wrenh' with upward inflection, simple 'oi' falling in pitch, squealing 'squeeh' during fights, snarling 'chauhhh-eesk' in alarm, grunting series of 'uk-uk-uk' at competitors, [and] various rattles."

== Status ==
The IUCN has assessed the black-banded woodcreeper as being of Least Concern. It has an extremely large range and an estimated population of between 50,000 and 500,000 mature individuals; the latter, however, is believed to be decreasing. No immediate threats have been identified. It is considered uncommon to fairly common in Amazonia except at its fringes. It is rare to scarce in the mountainous parts of its range. "At least some populations believed to require nearly continuous forest, and thus highly sensitive to human disturbance. Disappears from small forest fragments, but numbers may be only slightly reduced in larger fragments and selectively logged forest."
