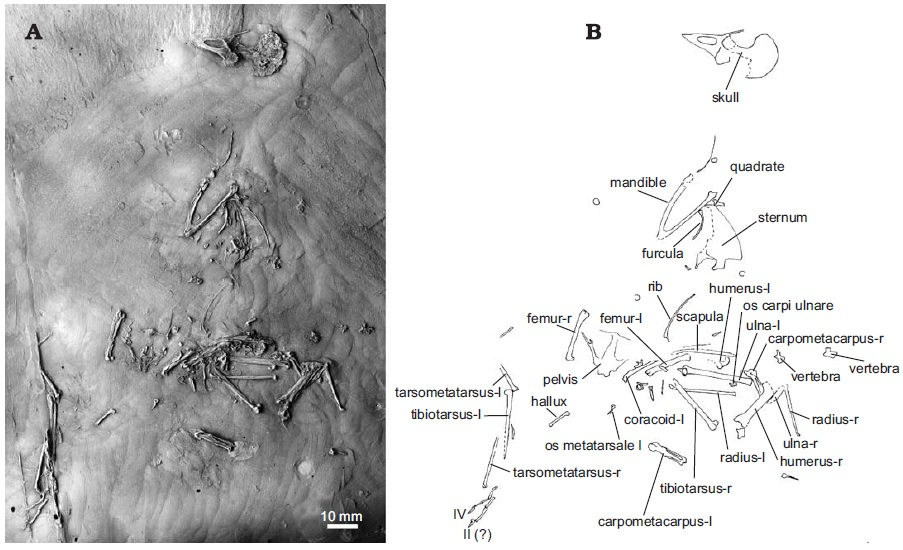
- Holotype slab (left) and interpretive drawing (right)

Scientific classification
- Kingdom: Animalia
- Phylum: Chordata
- Class: Aves
- Order: Passeriformes
- Suborder: Tyranni
- Genus: †Wieslochia; Mayr & Manegold, 2006
- Species: †W. weissi

Binomial name
- †Wieslochia weissi Mayr & Manegold, 2006

= Wieslochia =

Wieslochia Temporal range: Rupelian

Extinct genus of birds

Wieslochia is an extinct genus of passerine bird from the early Oligocene (27.8 to 33.9 million years ago) of Germany. Remains of this genus = have been found in a clay pit in Frauenweiler near Wiesloch, Germany. The holotype is a dissociated skeleton on two slabs. Another specimen consisting of a mandible and a cranium has been found in the same geological area. The taxonomic affinities of Wieslochia are not well understood, as it shares some similarities with suboscines, but it seems more primitive in other features. It was first described by Gerald Mayr and Albrecht Manegold in 2006. A 2024 study found strong support for it and the related Crosnoornis being members of the Tyranni, either as stem group or crown group members of the Eurylaimides.

== See also ==
- Jamninkaornis – another extinct member of the Tyranni
