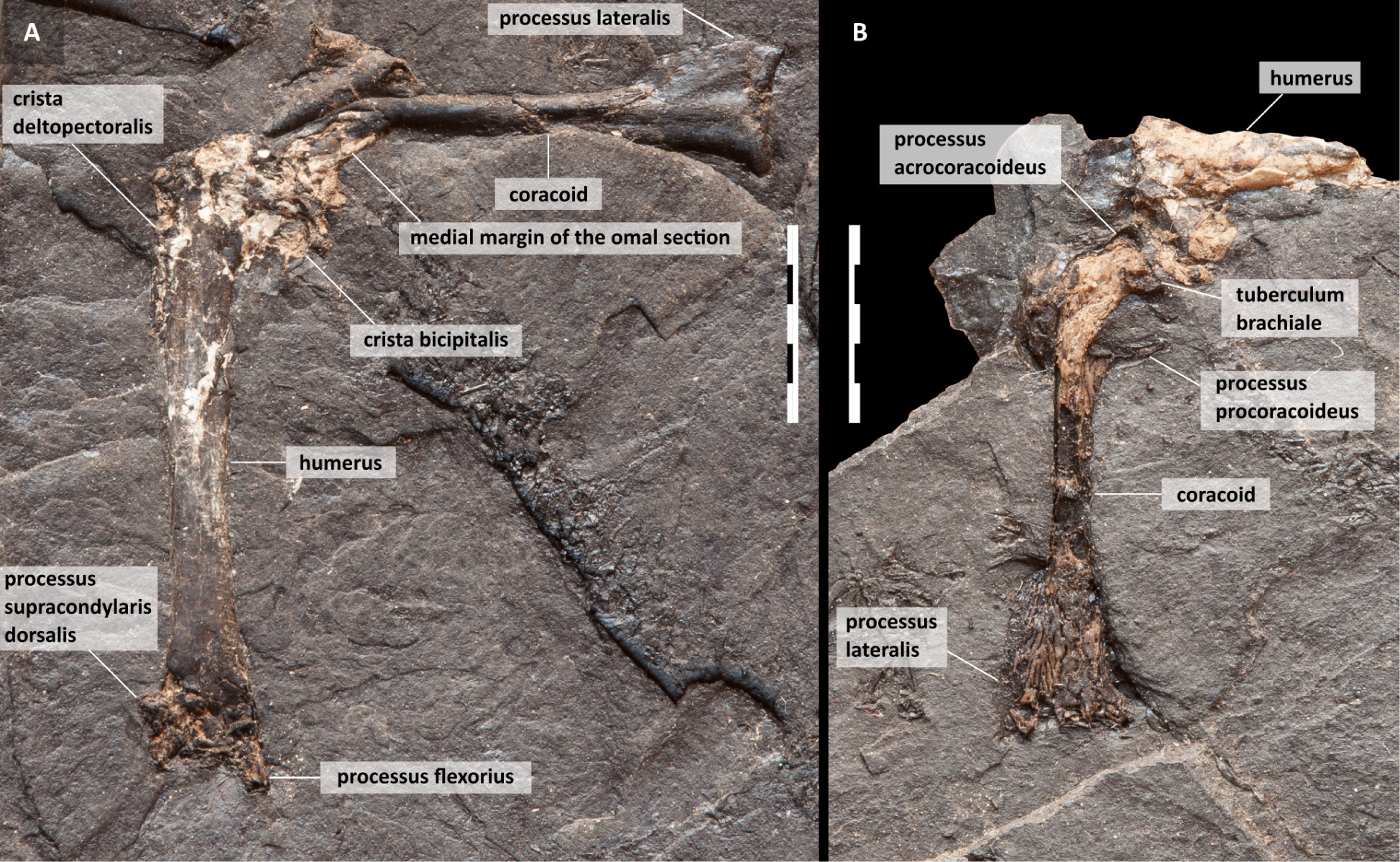
- Holotype specimen

Scientific classification
- Kingdom: Animalia
- Phylum: Chordata
- Class: Aves
- Order: Passeriformes
- Suborder: Tyranni
- Genus: †Jamninkaornis; Bochenski et al., 2026
- Species: †J. kencampbelli

Binomial name
- †Jamninkaornis kencampbelli Bochenski et al., 2026

= Jamninkaornis =

Jamninkaornis Temporal range: Late Oligocene (Chattian), ~26 Ma

Genus of extinct bird

Jamninkaornis (lit. 'Jamninka bird') is an extinct genus of passerine bird in the suborder Tyranni (suboscines), known from the late Oligocene (Chattian age, 26 million years ago) of Poland. The genus contains a single species, Jamninkaornis kencampbelli, known from a single coracoid and humerus (pectoral and forelimb bones).

== Discovery and naming ==
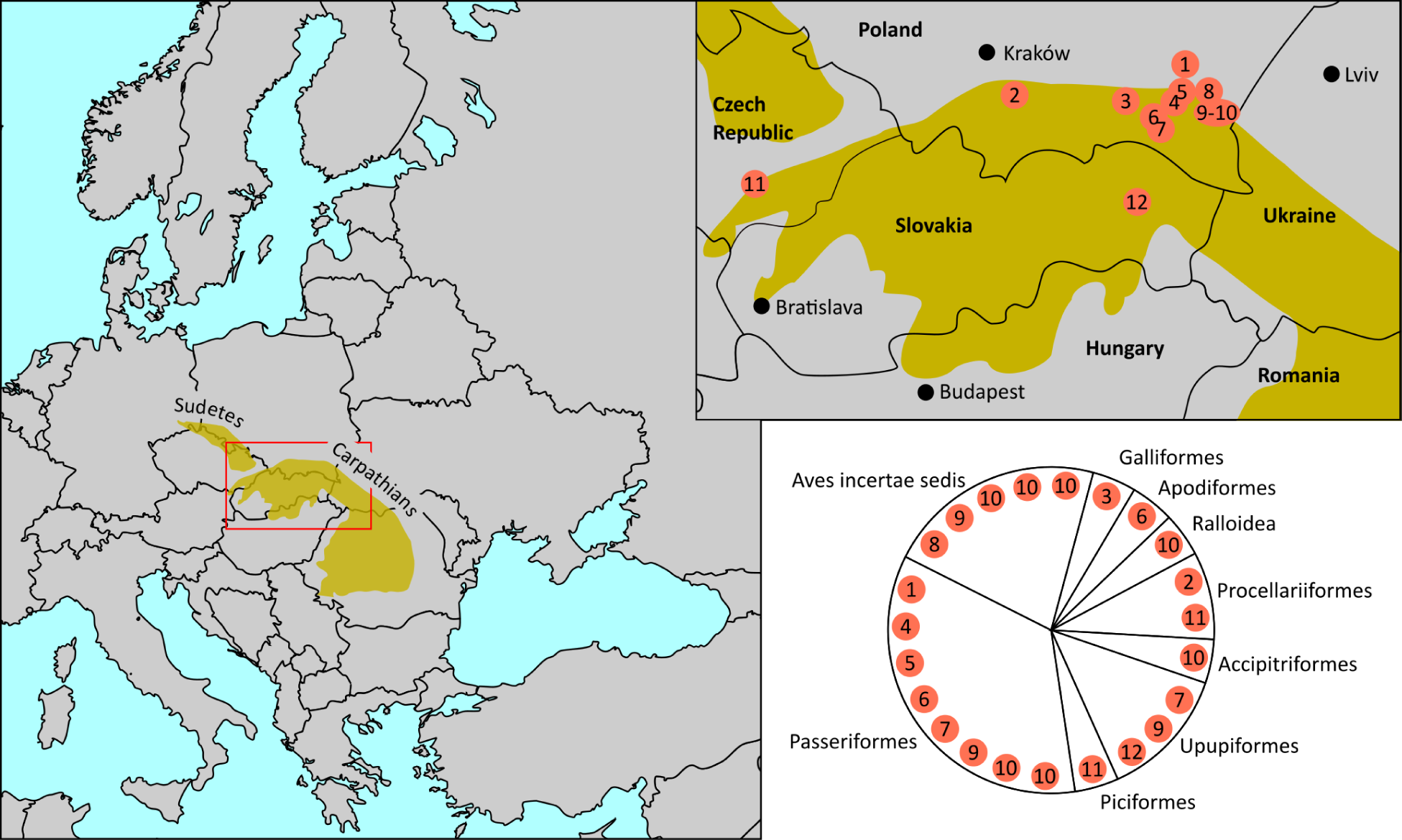
Type locality in the Carpathian arc (Jamna Dolna: 9–10)

The Jamninkaornis fossil material was discovered in rock outcrops near the former village site of Jamna Dolna in Podkarpackie Voivodeship (Subcarpathian province), southeast Poland. The specimen is housed at the Institute of Systematics and Evolution of Animals in Kraków, where it is permanently accessioned as specimen MSMD Av JAM2_1a+b. It consists of a right coracoid (pectoral girdle bone) and humerus (upper forelimb bone), preserved on two separate slabs of rock.

In 2026, Zbigniew M. Bochenski and colleagues described Jamninkaornis kencampbelli as a new genus and species of passerine bird based on these fossil remains, establishing MSMD Av JAM2_1a+b as the holotype specimen. The generic name, Jamninkaornis, combines a reference to Jamninka, a stream and valley close to the type locality, with the Greek word ὄρνῑς (órnīs), meaning 'bird'. The specific name, kencampbelli, honors the American paleornithologist Kenneth E. Campbell Jr., and his research on fossil birds.

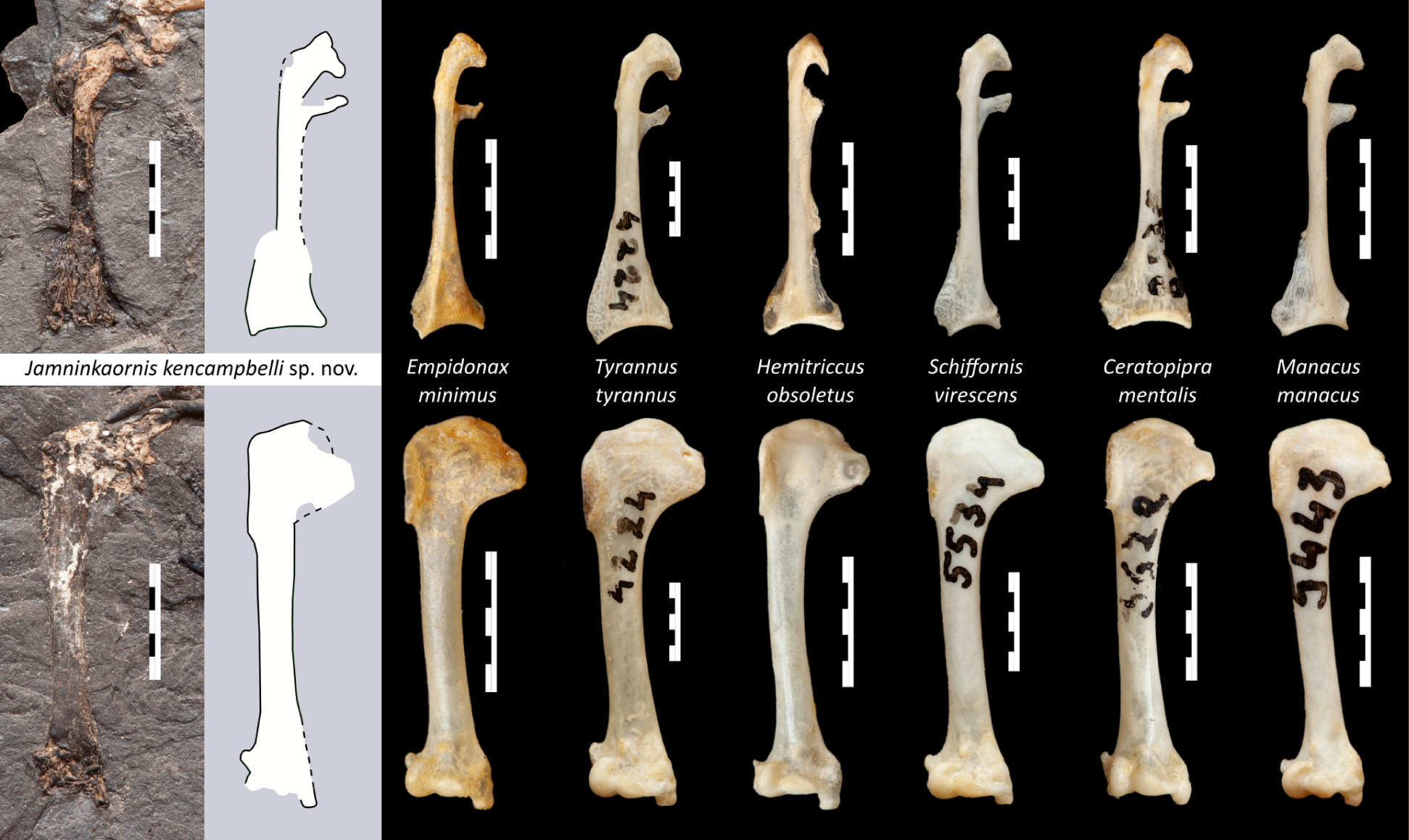
Coracoids (top) and humeri (bottom) of extant suboscines, compared to the corresponding elements in J. kencampbelli (far left, with interpretive drawing)

== See also ==
- Crosnoornis and Wieslochia, two other fossil suboscines
