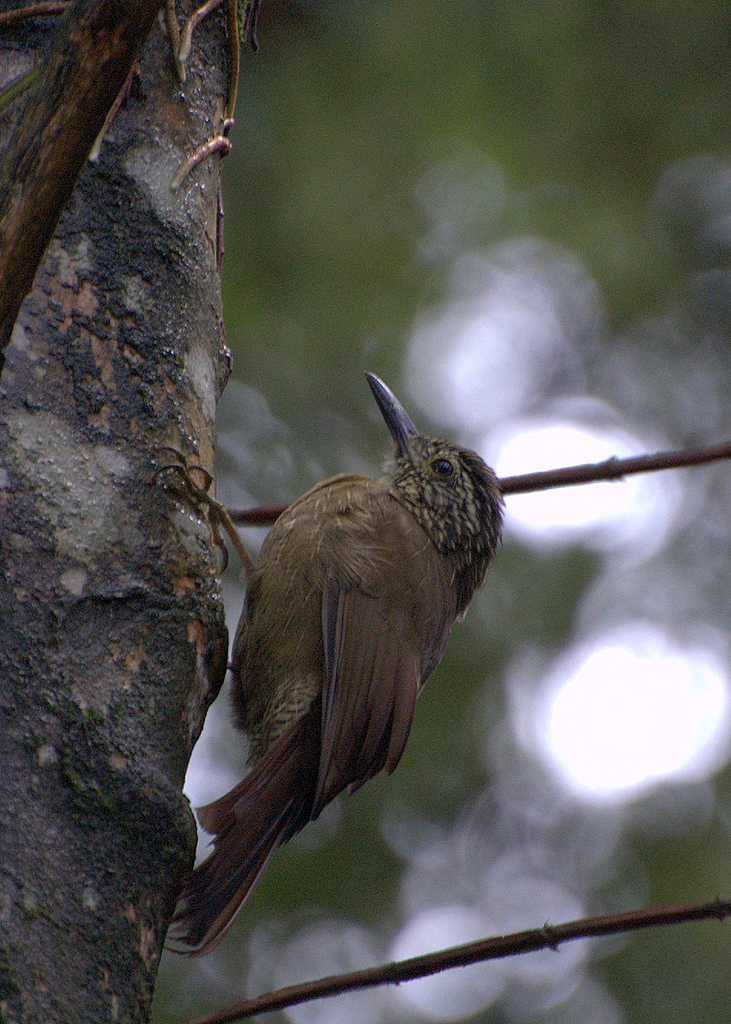
- Planalto woodcreeper (Dendrocolaptes platyrostris)

Scientific classification
- Kingdom: Animalia
- Phylum: Chordata
- Class: Aves
- Order: Passeriformes
- Family: Furnariidae
- Subfamily: Dendrocolaptinae
- Genus: Dendrocolaptes; Hermann, 1804

Type species
- Gracula cayennensis Gmelin, 1788

= Dendrocolaptes =

Genus of birds

Dendrocolaptes is a genus of Neotropical birds in the Dendrocolaptinae subfamily.

The genus was introduced by the French naturalist Johann Hermann in 1804. The type species was subsequently designated as the Amazonian barred woodcreeper (Dendrocolaptes certhia) by the English zoologist George Robert Gray in 1840. The genus name comes from Ancient Greek δένδρον (déndron), meaning "tree", and κολάπτης (koláptēs), meaning "chiseller, pecker".

== Species ==
The genus contains the following five species:

Image	Scientific name	Common name	Distribution
	Dendrocolaptes certhia	Amazonian barred woodcreeper	(Guyana, Suriname, Brazil, French Guiana, Colombia, Venezuela, also Ecuador, Peru, and Bolivia.
	Dendrocolaptes hoffmannsi	Hoffmanns's woodcreeper	Brazil, south of the Amazon river
	Dendrocolaptes picumnus	Black-banded woodcreeper	from Chiapas to Paraguay and northern Argentina.
	Dendrocolaptes platyrostris	Planalto woodcreeper	Brazil, Paraguay and far north-eastern Argentina.
	Dendrocolaptes sanctithomae	Northern barred woodcreeper	southern Mexico through Central America to Colombia, Venezuela and Ecuador.
