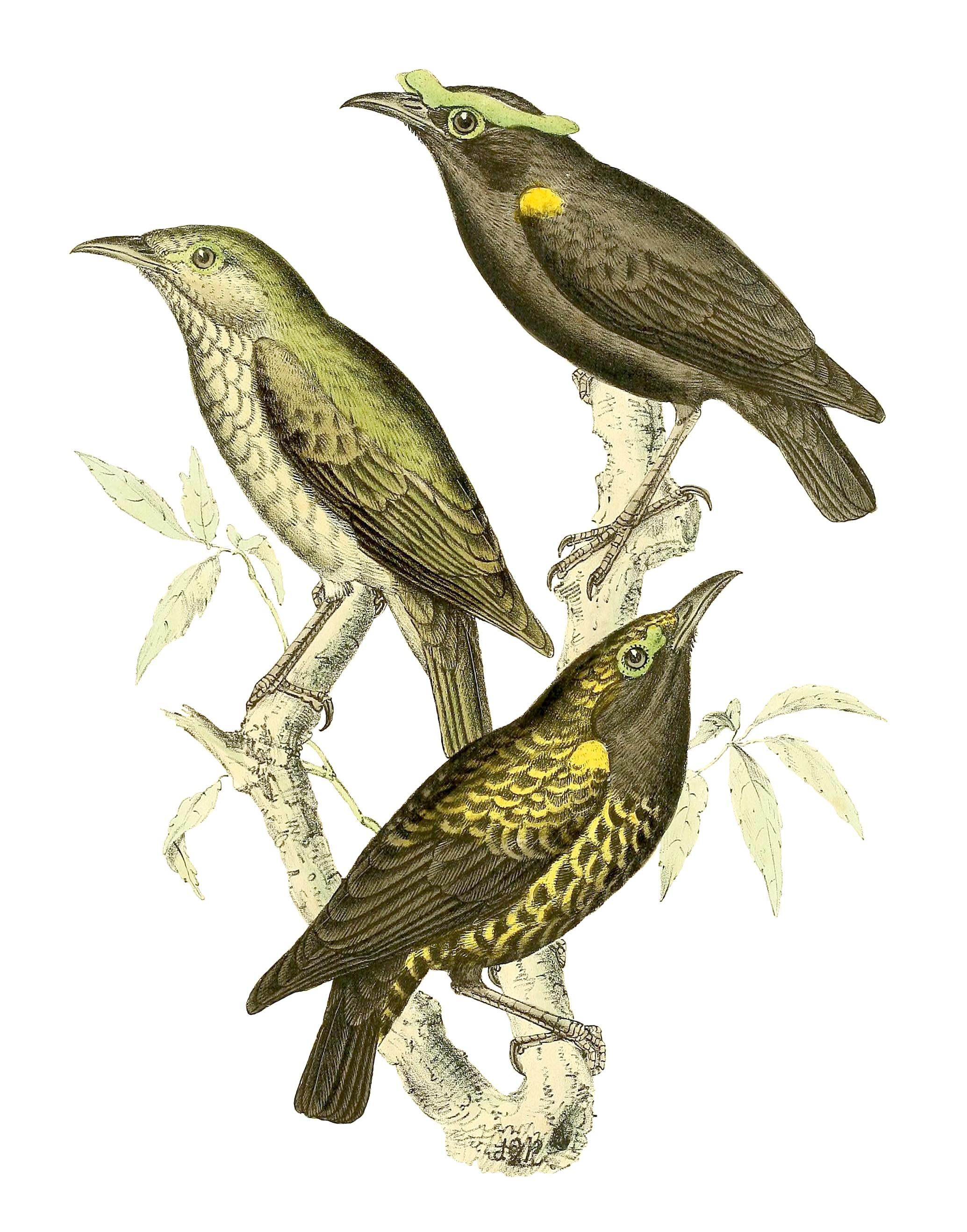
- Velvet asity (Philepitta castanea)

Scientific classification
- Kingdom: Animalia
- Phylum: Chordata
- Class: Aves
- Order: Passeriformes
- Family: Philepittidae
- Genus: Philepitta; I. Geoffroy Saint-Hilaire, 1838

Type species
- Philepitta sericea I. Geoffroy Saint-Hilaire, 1838

= Philepitta =

Genus of birds

Philepitta is a genus of bird in the family Philepittidae. Established by Isidore Geoffroy Saint-Hilaire in 1838, the genus contains the following species:

Genus Philepitta – I. Geoffroy Saint-Hilaire, 1838 – two species
Common name	Scientific name and subspecies	Range	Size and ecology	IUCN status and estimated population
Velvet asity Male Female	Philepitta castanea (Müller, 1776)	eastern Madagascar, as well as the northwestern corner of the island, between sea level and altitudes of 1,800. Commonly found in Ranomafana National Park (southeastern Madagascar) and the mountainous rainforests of Masoala National Park (northeastern Madagascar).	Size: Habitat: Diet:	LC
Schlegel's asity	Philepitta schlegeli (Schlegel, 1867)	northwestern Madagascar	Size: Habitat: Diet:	NT

The genus name Philepitta is a combination of the French name philédon, for the friarbirds of the family Meliphagidae and pitta, for the birds of the genus "pitta".

Philepitta is now the type-genus of a new bird family, the Philepittidae, which solely encompasses the asites of Madagascar.
