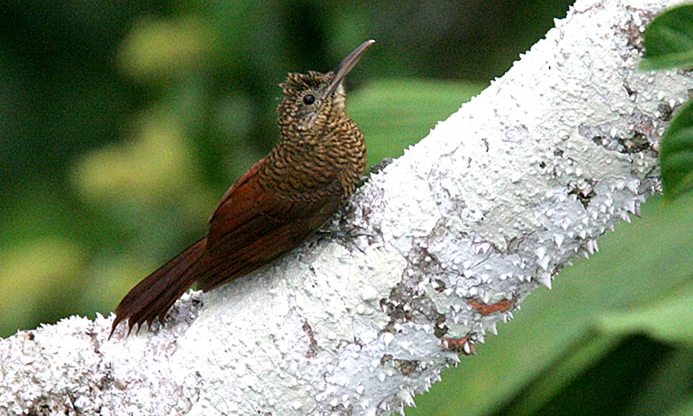
- Sacha Lodge, Ecuador

Conservation status
- Least Concern (IUCN 3.1)

Scientific classification
- Kingdom: Animalia
- Phylum: Chordata
- Class: Aves
- Order: Passeriformes
- Family: Furnariidae
- Genus: Dendrocolaptes
- Species: D. certhia

Binomial name
- Dendrocolaptes certhia (Boddaert, 1783)

= Amazonian barred woodcreeper =

Species of bird

The Amazonian barred woodcreeper (Dendrocolaptes certhia) is a sub-oscine passerine bird in subfamily Dendrocolaptinae of the ovenbird family Furnariidae. It is found in Bolivia, Brazil, Colombia, Ecuador, French Guiana, Guyana, Peru, Suriname, and Venezuela.

== Taxonomy and systematics ==
The Amazonian barred woodcreeper was described by the French polymath Georges-Louis Leclerc, Comte de Buffon in 1780 in his Histoire Naturelle des Oiseaux from two specimens collected in Cayenne, French Guiana. The bird was also illustrated in a hand-colored plate engraved by François-Nicolas Martinet in the Planches Enluminées D'Histoire Naturelle which was produced under the supervision of Edme-Louis Daubenton to accompany Buffon's text. Neither the plate caption nor Buffon's description included a scientific name but in 1783 the Dutch naturalist Pieter Boddaert coined the binomial name Picus certhia in his catalogue of the Planches Enluminées. The Amazonian barred woodcreeper is now one of five woodcreepers placed in the genus Dendrocolaptes that was introduced by the French naturalist Johann Hermann in 1804. The generic name is from the Ancient Greek dendrokolaptēs meaning "woodpecker". The specific epithet certhia is from the Ancient Greek kerthios, a word used by Aristotle for an unidentified small insectivorous bird.

The Amazonian barred woodcreeper's taxonomy is unsettled. The International Ornithological Committee (IOC) recognizes these seven subspecies:

- D. c. certhia (Boddaert, 1783)
- D. c. radiolatus Sclater, PL & Salvin, 1868
- D. c. juruanus von Ihering, H, 1905
- D. c. concolor Pelzeln, 1868
- D. c. medius Todd, 1920
- D. c. retentus Batista et al., 2013
- D. c. ridgwayi Hellmayr, 1905

The Clements taxonomy recognizes an eighth subspecies, D. c. polyzonus (Todd, 1913), which the IOC includes in D. c. juruanus. BirdLife International's Handbook of the Birds of the World (HBW) recognizes D. c. polyzonus but does not recognize D. c. ridgwayi.

What is now the northern barred woodcreeper (D. sanctithomae) was included in this species until the 1990s; the two form a superspecies. Subspecies D. c. concolor has been considered a separate species, the "concolor woodcreeper", but most taxonomists do not accept the separation. The authors who identified subspecies D. c. retentus treated all the subspecies as individual species but recognized that their analysis did not follow the biological species concept.

This article follows the IOC seven-subspecies model.

== Description ==
The Amazonian barred woodcreeper is one of the larger members of its subfamily. It is slim, with a long tail, a medium-length straight bill with a slightly hooked tip, and (in the male) a shaggy crest. It is 26 to 28.5 cm (10 to 11 in) long. Males weigh 50 to 73.5 g (1.8 to 2.6 oz) and females 52 to 79 g (1.8 to 2.8 oz). The sexes have the same plumage. Adults of the nominate subspecies D. c. certhia have a mostly brownish face with fine barring, a weak supercilium, and pale lores and auriculars. Their forehead to crown are darkish olive-brown with golden-buff streaks on the crown. Their back and wing coverts are a lighter olive-brown with weak blackish bars. Their flight feathers, rump, and tail are cinnamon-rufous to rufous-chestnut, with dusky tips on the primaries. Their chin and throat are pale gray to dirty white that contrasts with the deep buff to fulvous underparts; the underparts have fine dusky bars. Their underwing is cinnamon-rufous to ochre-yellow. Their iris is reddish to dark brown, their bill dark red to brownish with lighter edges and base of the mandible, and their legs and feet are brown, greenish, gray, olive, or black. Juveniles resemble adults but with less obvious barring, no pale streaks on the crown, and a shorter and darker bill.

Subspecies D. c. juruanus is like the nominate but without the golden streaks on the crown. D. c. radiolatus is more richly colored than the nominate, more cinnamon-brown above and ochraceus-brown below, and with stronger and darker barring on the back and underparts. D. c. concolor has little or no barring, darker plumage, and a redder bill. D. c. ridgwayi is similar to concolor but with more obvious barring. D. c. medius and D. c. retentus are very similar to the nominate but have a duller crown, a pale gray face, and paler underparts with weaker markings.

== Distribution and habitat ==
The Amazonian barred woodcreeper is a bird of the Amazon Basin. The subspecies are found thus:

- D. c. certhia, extreme eastern Colombia, southern and eastern Venezuela, the Guianas, and Brazil north of the Amazon River between the Rio Negro and the Atlantic Ocean in the state of Amapá
- D. c. radiolatus, north of the Amazon River in southeastern Colombia, eastern Ecuador, northern and central Peru, and northwestern Brazil east to the Rio Negro
- D. c. juruanus, south of the Amazon River in southeastern Peru, northern and central Bolivia, and western Brazil east to the Rio Madeira and south into Mato Grosso
- D. c. concolor, northeastern Bolivia, and Brazil between the Rio Madeira and Rio Tapajós (the "interfluvium")
- D. c. medius, northeastern Brazil south of the Amazon from the Rio Tocantins to the Atlantic in Maranhão state; also separately in coastal Pernambuco and Alagoas states, where possibly extirpated
- D. c. retentus, the Rio Xingu-Rio Tocantins interfluvium in Brazil's Pará state
- D. c. ridgwayi, Brazil south of the Amazon between the Rio Tapajós and Rio Xingu

The Amazonian barred woodcreeper inhabits humid evergreen forest. It is partial to mature terra firme forest but also regularly occurs in flooded and flood-plain forest. It is found less frequently in savanna forest, mangroves, and at the fringes of its range, deciduous and gallery forest. It is most common in primary forest interior but is regular at its edges and in mature secondary forest. In elevation it mostly ranges from sea level to 900 m (3,000 ft) but reaches about 1,400 m (4,600 ft) in the tepuis of the Venezuela-Guyana-Brazil borderlands. In Colombia and Ecuador it is most common below 600 m (2,000 ft).

== Behavior ==
=== Movement ===
The Amazonian barred woodcreeper is a year-round resident throughout its range.

=== Feeding ===
The Amazonian barred woodcreeper forages alone, as part of mixed-species feeding flocks, and by following army ant swarms to feed on prey disturbed by the ants. It typical follows ant swarms singly or in pairs but up to four have been observed at a swarm. When attending a swarm it typically perches on a near-vertical trunk and makes short flights to pick prey mostly from foliage but also from the ground, trunks, and vines. Away from ant swarms it forages by sallies from a perch to foliage and less frequently to trunks. Its diet is mostly arthropods including insects, spiders, centipedes, and caterpillars, and also includes small vertebrates like lizards.

=== Breeding ===
The Amazonian barred woodcreeper remains paired through the year. Its breeding season varies geographically and may extend for 10 months. It nests in a tree cavity, either natural or excavated by a woodpecker. The only documented clutch was single egg. Both parents apparently care for the young, but details of the care, the incubation period, and the time to fledging are not known.

=== Vocalization ===
The Amazonian barred woodcreeper mostly sings at dawn, sometimes at dusk, and rarely during the day. Its song is "a rapidly delivered series...of roughly 8–15 simple notes, ascends slightly at first and then descends and slows", also described as "rapid, whinnying, run-together series of up to 12 notes, 1st rising then fading and falling off." It has been rendered in words as "whee-whee-EE-EE-Ee-ee-ee-ee-ee-eu eu eu" and "tew-tew-tew-tew-tew-tew-tew-tew-tu-tu tu tu tu". The species' calls "include snarls, a 'chah-eef' alarm, squeaky 'chi-ku', [and] hissing 'piiiuh' ".

== Status ==
The IUCN has assessed the Amazonian barred woodcreeper as being of Least Concern. It has a very large range, and though its population size is not known it is believed to be stable. No immediate threats have been identified. It varies from uncommon to fairly common in the lowlands of most of its range. It is less common in the tepui region. Subspecies D. c. medius is very rare in the isolated subpopulation on the eastern coast, where almost all of its habitat is gone. "Unlike truly 'professional' ant-followers, this species can exist in, or colonize, both small forest fragments and selectively logged forest, at least for several years, provided that continuous forest is nearby."
