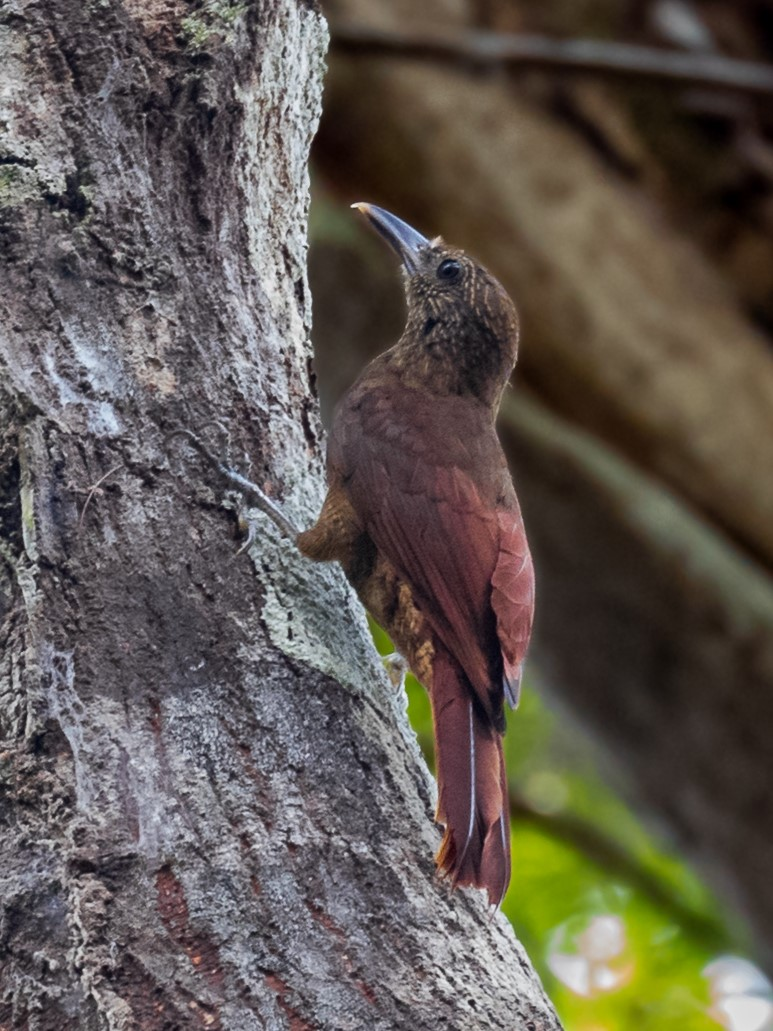

Conservation status
- Least Concern (IUCN 3.1)

Scientific classification
- Kingdom: Animalia
- Phylum: Chordata
- Class: Aves
- Order: Passeriformes
- Family: Furnariidae
- Genus: Dendrocolaptes
- Species: D. hoffmannsi

Binomial name
- Dendrocolaptes hoffmannsi Hellmayr, 1909

= Hoffmanns's woodcreeper =

Species of bird in Brazil

Hoffmanns's woodcreeper (Dendrocolaptes hoffmannsi) is a Vulnerable species of bird in the subfamily Dendrocolaptinae of the ovenbird family Furnariidae. It is endemic to Brazil.

== Taxonomy and systematics ==
Hoffmanns's woodcreeper is monotypic. It has in the past been treated as a subspecies of the black-banded woodcreeper (D. picumnus). Hoffmanns's, the black-banded, and the planalto woodcreeper (D. platyrostris) are very closely related, and several authors have suggested that they are conspecific.

== Description ==
Hoffmanns's woodcreeper is one of the larger members of its subfamily. It is slim, with a long tail and a medium-length straight bill. It is 28 to 29 cm (11 to 11 in) long. Males weigh 78.5 to 86 g (2.8 to 3.0 oz) and females 74 to 89 g (2.6 to 3.1 oz). The sexes have the same plumage. Adults have a dark buffy face with a faint scaly appearance and a faint supercilium. Their forehead and crown are rufescent that becomes rufous-brown on their nape and back; their crown feathers have black tips. Their rump, wings, and tail are cinnamon-rufous to rufous-chestnut. Their throat and underparts are dull buffy with an olive cast; the latter become more ochraceous on the belly. Their breast has faint buffy streaks. Their belly and flanks have faint narrow dusky bars. Their iris is light gray to brown, their bill dusky gray to black with usually a paler mandible, and their legs and feet gray. Juveniles are similar to adults but more reddish above and more ochraceous below with variable amounts of barring and streaking on their underparts.

== Distribution and habitat ==
Hoffmanns's woodcreeper is found in Amazonian Brazil south of the Amazon River between the Rio Madeira and Rio Tapajós. To the south it reaches Rondônia and Mato Grosso. It inhabits humid forest of both terra firme and várzea types. It favors the interior of primary forest but also occurs at its edges and in mature secondary forest.

== Behavior ==
=== Movement ===
Hoffmanns's woodcreeper is a year-round resident throughout its range.

=== Feeding ===
The diet of Hoffmanns's woodcreeper had not been documented but is assumed to be mostly arthropods. It often follows army ant swarms and is thought to also join mixed-species feeding flocks. It mostly forages singly. When following ant swarms it perches on vertical trunks within 2 m (7 ft) of the ground and sallies from there to pick prey from vegetation. Away from ant swarms it forages as high as the subcanopy.

=== Breeding ===
Hoffmanns's woodcreeper appears to breed in the late dry and early wet seasons of September to November. One nest was in a cavity in a dead tree trunk about 18 m (60 ft) above the ground. Nothing else is known about the species' breeding biology.

=== Vocalization ===
Hoffmanns's woodcreeper mostly sings at dawn, though probably at dusk as well. Its song is a "level, rapid 'wutwutwut---' " with up to about 20 iterations. Its calls include " 'wh'kai', 'kaihh-jeep' and snarling."

== Status ==
The IUCN originally assessed Hoffmanns's woodcreeper as being of Least Concern, and as of 2024, it is again considered Least Concern. However, from 2012 – 2024, the species was considered to be Vulnerable due to rapid deforestation across its habitat. While deforestation continues, and the species' population is believed to be decreasing, it has a very large range and relatively slow rate of decline. It "occurs in a region that is ornithologically poorly known" and is "rarely seen and little-known".
