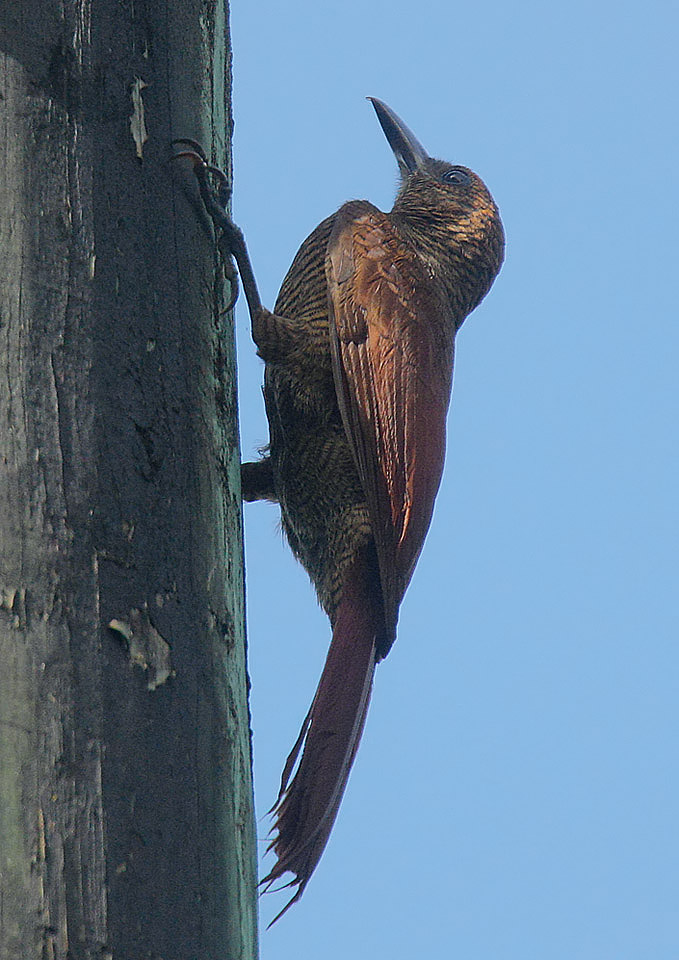

Conservation status
- Least Concern (IUCN 3.1)

- Vulnerable (IUCN 3.1)

Scientific classification (See Taxonomy and Status sections)
- Kingdom: Animalia
- Phylum: Chordata
- Class: Aves
- Order: Passeriformes
- Family: Furnariidae
- Genus: Dendrocolaptes
- Species: D. sanctithomae

Binomial name
- Dendrocolaptes sanctithomae (Lafresnaye, 1852)
- Range of northern barred woodcreeper excluding D. s. punctipectus

Synonyms
- Dendrocolaptes certhia sanctithomae

= Northern barred woodcreeper =

Species of bird

The northern barred woodcreeper (Dendrocolaptes sanctithomae) is a sub-oscine passerine bird in subfamily Dendrocolaptinae of the ovenbird family Furnariidae. It is found from southern Mexico through Central America to Colombia, Venezuela and Ecuador.

== Taxonomy and systematics ==
The northern barred woodcreeper was originally treated as a subspecies of the Amazonian barred woodcreeper (D. certhia). They were separated in the 1990s and remain a superspecies. Its further taxonomy, however, is unsettled. The International Ornithological Committee (IOC) and the Clements taxonomy assign it these four subspecies:

- D. s. sheffleri Binford, 1965
- D. s. sanctithomae (Lafresnaye, 1852)
- D. s. hesperius Bangs, 1907
- D. s. punctipectus Phelps, WH & Gilliard, 1940

BirdLife International's Handbook of the Birds of the World (HBW) treats D. s. punctipectus as a separate species, the eastern barred woodcreeper, and calls D. sanctitihomae the western barred woodcreeper. Clements recognizes the western and eastern designations within the single species, and the South American Classification Committee of the American Ornithological Society notes a publication that proposes the separation. Subspecies D. s. sheffleri has been treated by at least one author as a separate species, and several subspecies in addition to the four have been proposed and rejected.

This article follows the four-subspecies model.

== Description ==
The northern barred woodcreeper is one of the larger members of its subfamily. It is slim, with a long tail, a medium-length straight bill, and (in the male) a shaggy crest. It is 25 to 29 cm (9.8 to 11 in) long. Males weigh 53 to 72 g (1.9 to 2.5 oz) and females 54 to 83 g (1.9 to 2.9 oz). The sexes have the same plumage. Adults of the nominate subspecies D. s. sanctithomae have a mostly cinnamon-brown face with fine barring, a faint rufous supercilium, black lores, and a rich rufescent forehead, crown, and nape. Their back and wing coverts are olive-brown and their rump and tail are cinnamon-rufous to rufous-chestnut. Their crown and back have black barring. Their flight feathers are also cinnamon-rufous to rufous-chestnut, with dusky tips on the primaries. Their chin, throat, and underparts are golden to cinnamon-buff with narrow well-defined black barring. Their iris is light to dark brown, their bill mostly blackish with paler edges and base of the mandible, and their legs and feet variable among dark brown, black, grayish green, bluish, and horn. Juveniles are similar to adults but with more diffuse barring on their underparts, redder undertail coverts, and an entirely black bill.

Subspecies D. s. sheffleri compared to the nominate has sparser barring on its upperparts, narrower barring on its underparts, and a grayish tinge on the lower breast that contrasts with the more yellowish balance of its underparts. D. s. hesperius is overall duller than the nominate and has weaker barring on its upperparts and finer barring on its underparts. D. s. punctipectus is mostly brown with dusky barring but for mottling on the chin and throat. It also has rufous-chestnut lower back, wings, and tail. Its bill is heavier than that of the nominate and entirely brownish black.

== Distribution and habitat ==
The subspecies of the northern barred woodcreeper are found thus:

- D. s. sheffleri, the Pacific slope of southwestern Mexico's Sierra Madre del Sur
- D. s. sanctithomae, on the Caribbean slope from Veracruz and the Yucatán Peninsula in Mexico south through Belize, Guatemala, Honduras, Nicaragua, and Costa Rica into Panama; on the Pacific slope from Chiapas, Mexico, south intermittently through Guatemala, El Salvador, Honduras, Nicaragua, Costa Rica, Panama, and northern and western Colombia into northwestern Ecuador
- D. s. hesperius, the Pacific slope of southwestern Costa Rica and western Panama
- D. s. punctipectus, northern Colombia from the valley of the Magdalena River east into northwestern Venezuela (Note that the map excludes this subspecies' range.)

The northern barred woodcreeper primarily inhabits humid tall evergreen forest. It also occurs in less tall forest, gallery forest, semi-deciduous forest, and mangroves, and even less frequently in cloudforest and pine-oak woodlands. It favors the forest interior but is regular at its edges, in mature secondary forest, and in plantations near natural forest. It is mostly a bird of the lowlands, most frequently found below 1,000 m (3,300 ft) of elevation. It reaches only 800 m (2,600 ft) in Ecuador, but occurs as high as 1,800 m (5,900 ft) in northern Central America, 1,300 m (4,300 ft) in Costa Rica, and 1,200 m (3,900 ft) in Colombia.

== Behavior ==
=== Movement ===
The northern barred woodcreeper is mostly sedentary but may make some post-breeding movements from the lowlands to higher elevations.

=== Feeding ===
The northern barred woodcreeper forages mostly by following army ant swarms to feed on prey disturbed by the ants. It typical follows them singly or in pairs but up to four have been observed at a swarm. When attending a swarm it typically perches on a near-vertical trunk and makes short flights to pick prey from the ground, from trunks, vines, and foliage, and in mid-air. It also sometimes forages away from ant swarms, usually in the forest's low to mid-levels, but also to the sub-canopy. Its diet is mostly arthropods including insects, spiders, centipedes, and scorpions, and also includes small vertebrates like lizards.

=== Breeding ===
The northern barred woodcreeper's breeding season varies geographically, for example at least between May and July in Costa Rica and November to March in Colombia. It nests fairly near the ground in a cavity in a hollow trunk or a natural cavity such as is formed by a broken off branch. It lines the cavity with leaves and bark flakes. The clutch is two eggs. Both parents apparently incubate the clutch, but the incubation period, time to fledging, and other details of parental care are not known.

=== Vocalization ===
The northern barred woodcreeper mostly sings at dawn and dusk but also intermittently during the day. The song of the "western" three subspecies is a series of loud whistles that rise at the end. It is variously put in words as "téw-wee, téw-wee, téw-weea", a "slightly nasal pwee-PWEE-PWEE-PWEE-peeeurr", "a penetrating doh-wee, doh-wee, doh-wee, do-wee", and "oowít, oowít, oowít, OOWIT, OOWIT!". It has a variety of calls including " 'oiýnk' or 'awwýnk', snarling 'wi-kaíh' and 'caa', grunting 'eh', murmured 'auh-auh-auh-auh-auh', quiet 'wh-whee', [and] also nasal 'kíyarrr'."

The song of the "eastern" subspecies D. s. punctipectus is very different from that of the other three. It "consists of the same number of whistles but which, instead of being markedly upslurred throughout, start flat in pitch and become progressively overslurred, hence much narrower frequency range on first notes and lower maximum frequency over entire song." Its calls apparently are the same as those of the other subspecies.

== Status ==
The IUCN follows HBW taxonomy and so has assessed the "eastern" barred woodcreeper D. s. punctipectus separately from the three "western" subspecies. The "western" complex is assessed as being of Least Concern. It has a large range but its population size is not known and is believed to be decreasing. No immediate threats have been identified. The "eastern" subspecies is assessed as Vulnerable. It has a somewhat restricted range. Its population is estimated at between 2500 and 10,000 mature individuals and is believed to be decreasing. Forest clearance for timber and conversion to agriculture and ranching are the principal threats. The "western" barred woodcreeper complex is generally uncommon to common in most of its range, though uncommon at higher elevations and in limited or marginal habitat such as in El Salvador and on the Yucatán Peninsula. The "eastern" barred woodcreeper is "[p]robably among the most threatened of all dendrocolaptids as a result of extensive habitat destruction within its highly restricted, lowland range". It does occur in both privately owned and public protected areas, with the former generally better protected.

"Like most ant-following species, [the northern barred woodcreeper] requires a relatively large home range and considered to be sensitive to forest fragmentation and other forms of human disturbance, and unlikely to colonize new areas across barriers of unsuitable habitat."
