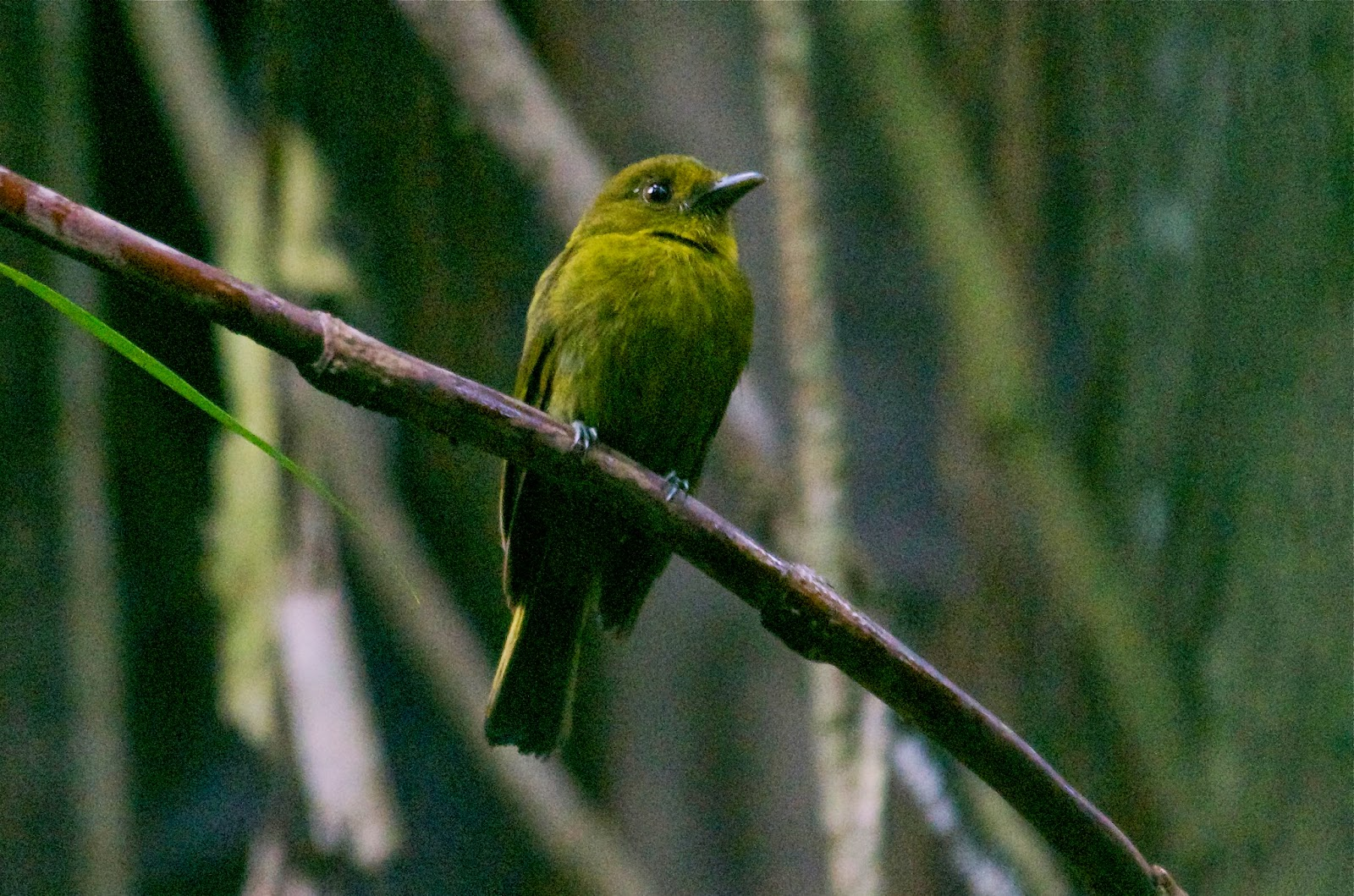
- Nusagandi, Panama

Conservation status
- Least Concern (IUCN 3.1)

Scientific classification
- Kingdom: Animalia
- Phylum: Chordata
- Class: Aves
- Order: Passeriformes
- Suborder: Tyranni
- Infraorder: Eurylaimides
- Family: Sapayoidae; Irestedt et al. 2006
- Genus: Sapayoa; Hartert, 1903
- Species: S. aenigma

Binomial name
- Sapayoa aenigma Hartert, 1903

Audio

= Sapayoa =

Species of bird

The sapayoa or broad-billed sapayoa (Sapayoa aenigma) is a suboscine passerine bird found Colombia, Ecuador, and Panama.

== Taxonomy and systematics ==
As the sapayoa's specific epithet aenigma ("the enigma") implies, its relationships have long been elusive.

The sapayoa was formally described by the German ornithologist Ernst Hartert in 1903 under the present binomial name Sapayoa aenigma. It has always been considered a monotypic genus, Sapayoa, and historically regarded as a New World suboscine; in particular, it was assigned to the manakin family (Pipridae). However, the species was listed as incertae sedis (position uncertain) in the Sibley-Ahlquist taxonomy, because

"preliminary DNA-DNA hybridization comparisons ... indicate that this species is either a relative of the Old World Eurylaimidae or a sister group of all other Tyrannida, as suggested by earlier biochemical studies .... In any event, it is not a close relative of manakins or any other recent tyrannoid."

More recent research suggests that it is not a New World suboscine at all, but an Old World suboscine. In 2004, it was shown that the sapayoa is an outlier to the New World suboscines. In an earlier analysis based on nDNA myoglobin intron 2 and GAPDH intron 11 sequence data, the authors found the sapayoa

"as a deep branch in the group of broadbills and pittas of the Old World tropics."

Accordingly, the sapayoa would be the last surviving New World species of a lineage that evolved in Australia-New Guinea when Gondwana was in the process of splitting apart. The sapayoa's ancestors are hypothesized to have reached South America via the Western Antarctica Peninsula.

Beginning in about 2010, major taxonomic systems moved the sapayoa into its own family Sapayoidae. However, they differ in its placement in a linear sequence of families. The International Ornithological Committee (IOC) places it second among passerine families, between Acanthisittidae (the New Zealand wrens) and Philepittidae (the Madagascar asities). The Clements taxonomy places several other families between the New Zealand wrens and the sapayoa and follows it with the asities. BirdLife International's Handbook of the Birds of the World places it further down the linear sequence, between Eurylaimidae (typical broadbills) and Calyptomenidae (African and green broadbills).

All the systems agree that the sapayoa is monotypic.

== Description ==
The sapayoa is 13.5 to 15 cm (5.3 to 5.9 in) long and weighs about 21 g (0.74 oz). Its head and upperparts are olive with a dusky tinge to the wings and tail. It throat and belly are a yellower olive. Its bill is wide and black with rictal bristles around it. Its iris is dull reddish brown and its legs are gray. Males have a yellow stripe on the crown.

== Distribution and habitat ==
The sapayoa is found from the Panama Canal Zone south through western Colombia into extreme northwestern Ecuador. It inhabits humid forest from the understory to the mid-level, and often occurs in ravines and near watercourses. In elevation it ranges as high as 1,200 m (3,900 ft) in Colombia but only to 500 m (1,600 ft) in Ecuador.

== Behavior ==
=== Movement ===
The sapayoa is assumed to be a year-round resident in its range.

=== Feeding ===
The sapayoa typically feeds by perching for long periods between sallies to catch insects on the wing or from foliage. It also feeds on small fruits. It often joins mixed-species feeding flocks.

=== Breeding ===
The sapayoa's breeding season includes at least March to September in Panama and February to April in Colombia. Its pear-shaped nest is made from long strips of bark and other fibers, some of which dangle beneath the structure, and has a side entrance near its bottom. It is suspended from a branch, often above a stream. Two nests each held two nestlings. Both parents fed the brood at one. At the other the female brooded them and an adult male and two immature males attended her and the brood.

=== Vocalization ===
The sapayoa's vocalizations are not well known. One is "a soft trill" and another is "a slightly louder 'chipp, ch-ch-ch' ".

== Status ==
The IUCN has assessed the sapayoa as being of Least Concern, though its population size is not known and is believed to be decreasing. No immediate threats have been identified. It is "[a]pparently rare to uncommon, and possibly rather local in distribution."
