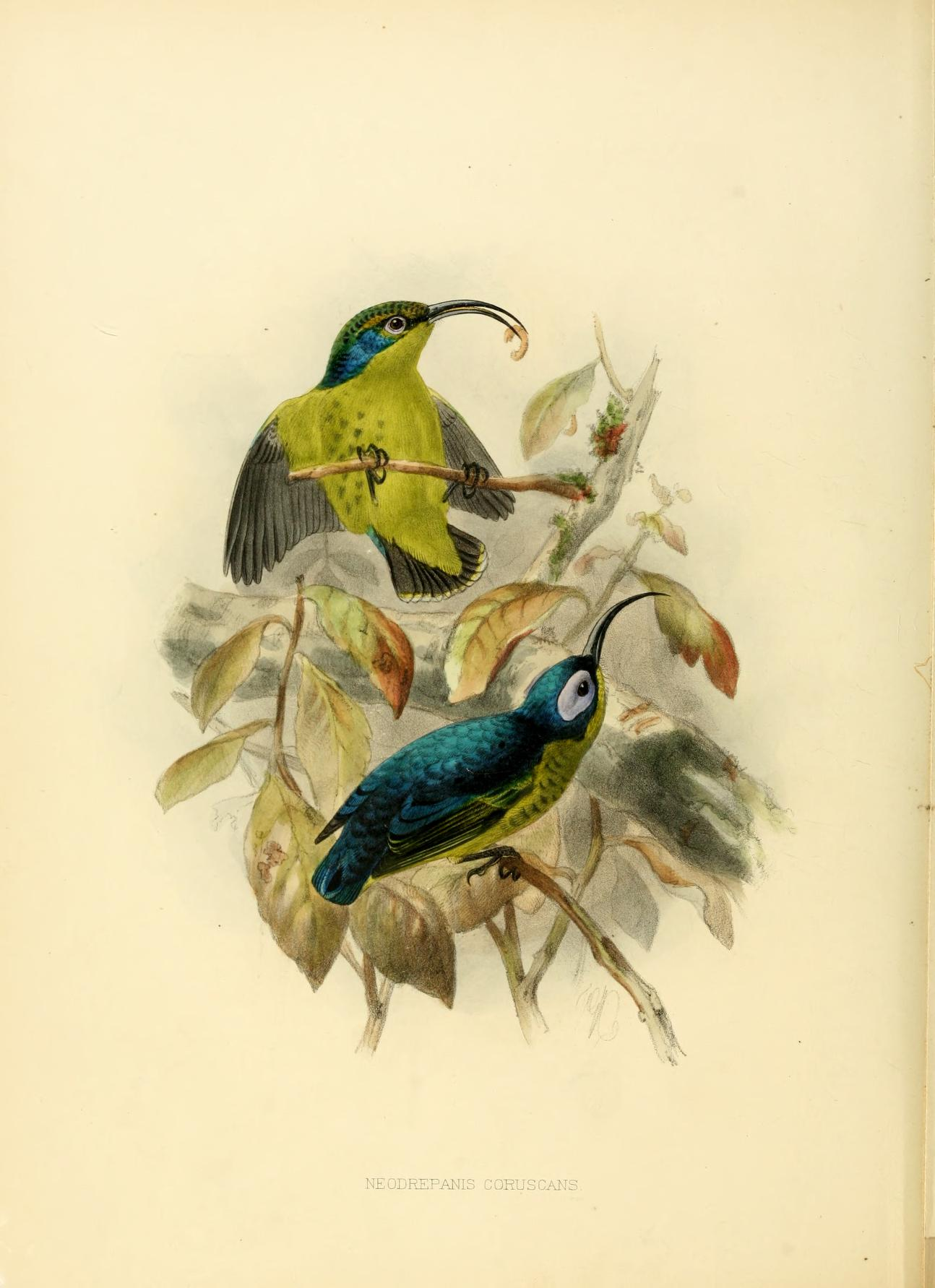
- Common sunbird-asity (Neodrepanis coruscans)

Scientific classification
- Kingdom: Animalia
- Phylum: Chordata
- Class: Aves
- Order: Passeriformes
- Family: Philepittidae
- Genus: Neodrepanis; Sharpe, 1875

Type species
- Neodrepanis coruscans Sharpe, 1875

= Neodrepanis =

Genus of birds

Neodrepanis is a bird genus in the family Philepittidae.

== Etymology ==
Neodrepanis: Greek: νεος neos "new, strange"; δρεπανη drepanē, δρεπανης drepanēs "scimitar"

== Species ==
It contains the following species:

Genus Neodrepanis – Sharpe, 1875 – two species
Common name	Scientific name and subspecies	Range	Size and ecology	IUCN status and estimated population
Common sunbird-asity	Neodrepanis coruscans Sharpe, 1875	Madagascar	Size: Habitat: Diet:	LC
Yellow-bellied sunbird-asity	Neodrepanis hypoxantha Salomonsen, 1933	Madagascar	Size: Habitat: Diet:	VU
