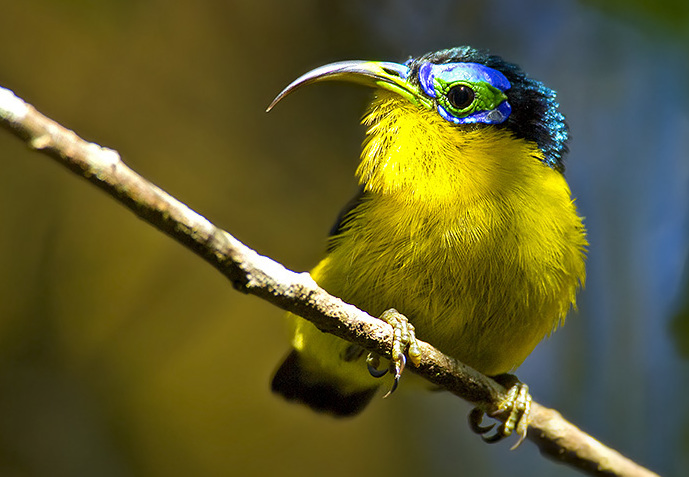

Conservation status
- Vulnerable (IUCN 3.1)

Scientific classification
- Kingdom: Animalia
- Phylum: Chordata
- Class: Aves
- Order: Passeriformes
- Family: Philepittidae
- Genus: Neodrepanis
- Species: N. hypoxantha

Binomial name
- Neodrepanis hypoxantha Salomonsen, 1933

= Yellow-bellied sunbird-asity =

Species of bird

The yellow-bellied sunbird-asity (Neodrepanis hypoxantha) is a small species of passerine bird from the asity family. The male has black upper parts with a bluish sheen and yellow underparts, and is sometimes known simply as the yellow-bellied asity. It is found only in montane rainforests of Madagascar where it feeds on nectar that it sips from flowers, defending a good nectar source from other nectar-feeding birds. It is listed by the International Union for Conservation of Nature as "vulnerable" due to the diminution and fragmentation of its forest habitat.

== Description ==
The plumage of male yellow-bellied sunbird-asities is very bright, with clean yellow undersides and dark black upper sides with an iridescent blue sheen; the females are duller. The eye is surrounded by a bright blue wattle which derives its colour, like the rest of the asities, from bundles of collagen. The bill is long and decurved, as it is adapted for nectar feeding.

== Behaviour ==
This species is endemic to montane forest above 1600 m on the island of Madagascar. Yellow-bellied sunbird-asities are active nectar feeders. They will aggressively defend a nectar source from rivals of the same species as well as from sunbirds.

The yellow-bellied sunbird-asity is listed as vulnerable by BirdLife International and the IUCN. It was once considered to be an endangered species, and even possibly extinct; however, this was due to a lack of ornithological surveys in its high-altitude range. Subsequent research has found it to be more abundant than previously suspected, although it is still considered threatened due to habitat loss and fragmentation.
