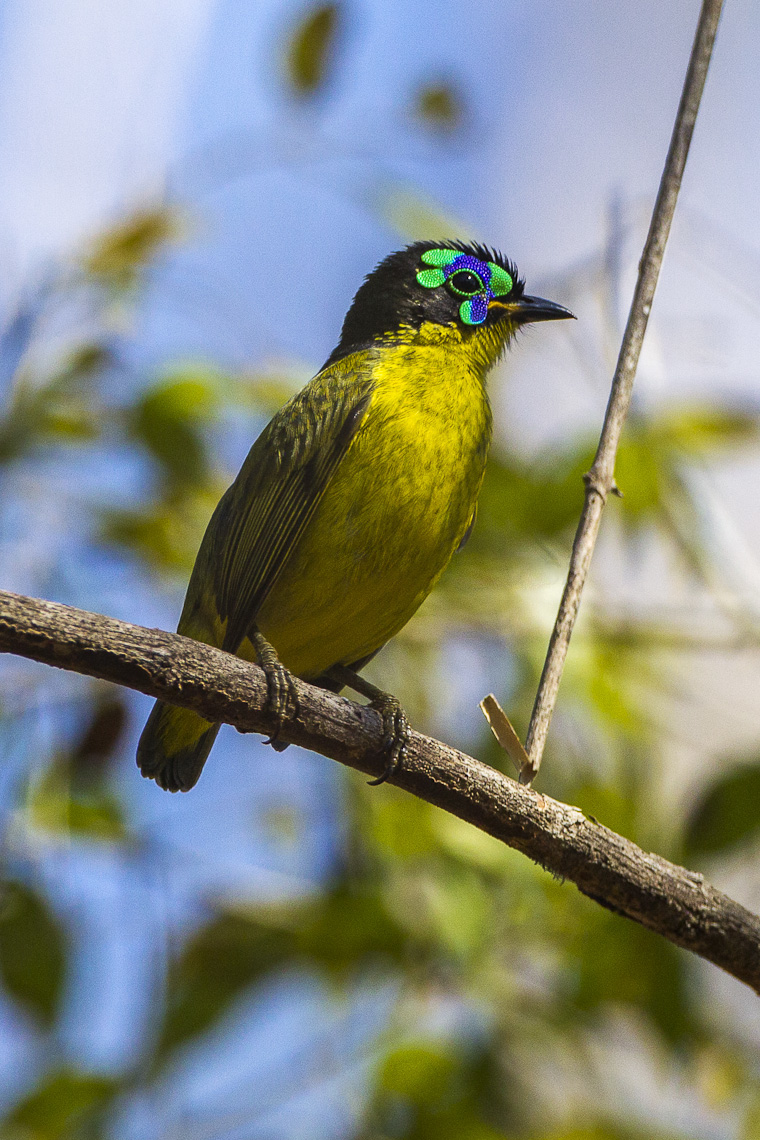

Conservation status
- Vulnerable (IUCN 3.1)

Scientific classification
- Kingdom: Animalia
- Phylum: Chordata
- Class: Aves
- Order: Passeriformes
- Family: Philepittidae
- Genus: Philepitta
- Species: P. schlegeli

Binomial name
- Philepitta schlegeli Schlegel, 1867

= Schlegel's asity =

Species of bird

Schlegel's asity (Philepitta schlegeli) is a species of bird in the family Philepittidae. It is endemic to Madagascar. Its natural habitats are subtropical or tropical dry forest and subtropical or tropical moist lowland forest. It is considered vulnerable by habitat loss.
