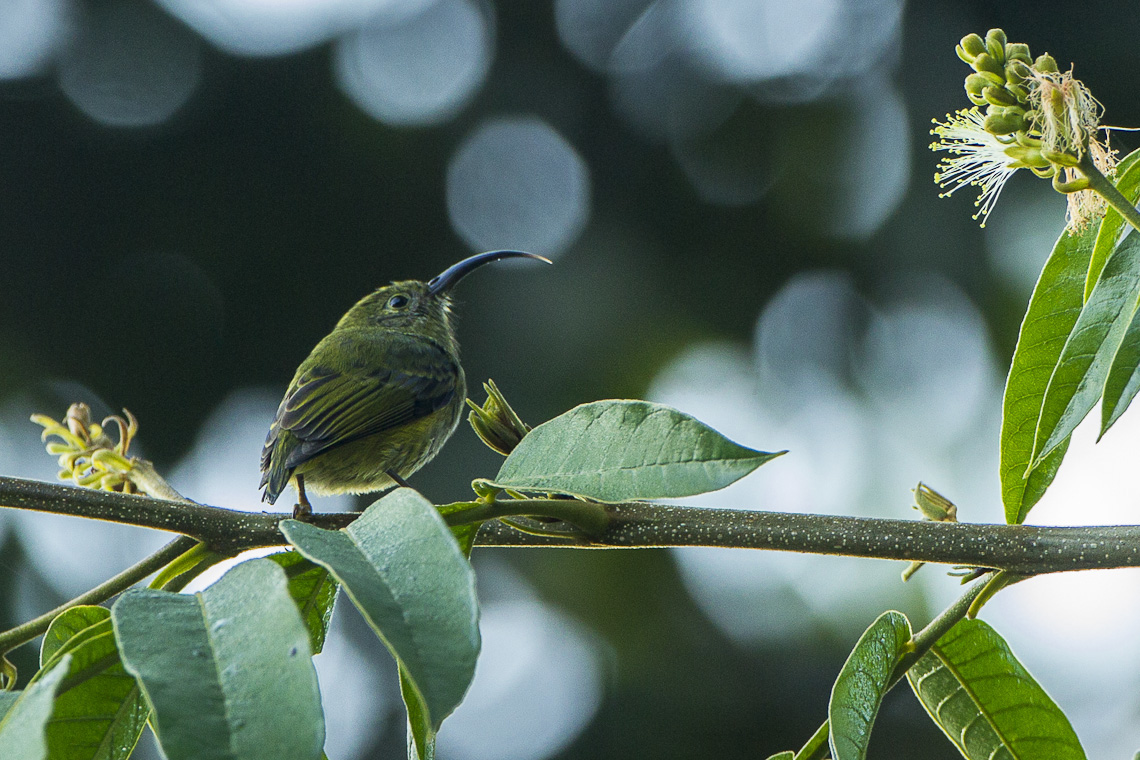

Conservation status
- Least Concern (IUCN 3.1)

Scientific classification
- Kingdom: Animalia
- Phylum: Chordata
- Class: Aves
- Order: Passeriformes
- Family: Philepittidae
- Genus: Neodrepanis
- Species: N. coruscans

Binomial name
- Neodrepanis coruscans Sharpe, 1875

= Common sunbird-asity =

Species of bird

The common sunbird-asity or sunbird asity (Neodrepanis coruscans) is a species of bird in the family Philepittidae. It is endemic to Madagascar. Its natural habitat is subtropical or tropical moist lowland forests.

== Description ==
The genus Neodrepanis is characterised by a tiny body with a short tail, a fine, strongly decurved bill and, during the breeding season, strong sexual dichromatism. Males in breeding plumage are brilliant blue and black above and variably bright yellow below, with extraordinary blue and green facial caruncles. Females, males in non-breeding plumage and immatures are dull blue-green above, lack caruncles and are variably yellowish below; some female-plumaged birds have a half-sized caruncle and may be immature males. In winter, males are often seen with traces of breeding plumage coloration.

Male common sunbird-asities are duller than yellow-bellied in almost all respects. The former have brilliant royal blue-fringed back crown, nape, mantle and scapular feathers, and narrow but fairly conspicuous yellow fringes to the secondaries and greater and median wing coverts. Their underparts are dull, deep yellow, with strong olive-brown streaking in the centre of the breast; the flanks, belly and undertail coverts are unstreaked and somewhat brighter. The caruncle is almost square and turquoise-blue, rather greener around the eye. It extends only a short distance in front of the eye, and is not connected to the area of blue (basally) and green (distally) bare skin that overlies the basal quarter of the bill.
