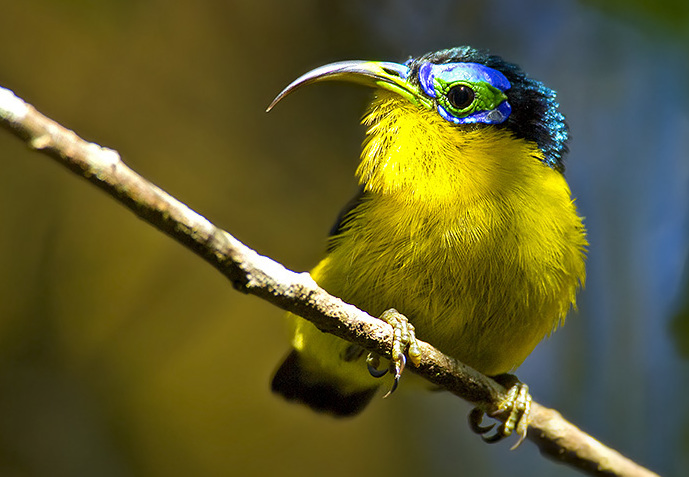
- Yellow-bellied sunbird-asity

Scientific classification
- Kingdom: Animalia
- Phylum: Chordata
- Class: Aves
- Order: Passeriformes
- Infraorder: Eurylaimides
- Family: Philepittidae; Sharpe, 1870

Genera
- Philepitta; Neodrepanis

= Asity =

Asities

Family of birds

The asities are a family of birds, Philepittidae, that are endemic to Madagascar. The asities consist of four species in two genera. The Neodrepanis species are known as sunbird-asities and were formerly known as false sunbirds.

Philepitta is now the type-genus of a new bird family, the Philepittidae, into which the asities of Madagascar have been placed.

== Description ==
Asities are small forest birds with sexually dichromic plumage and brightly coloured wattles around the eyes of the males. These wattles, which are most conspicuous during the breeding season, get their colour from arrays of collagen fibres. This method of pigmentation is unique in the animal kingdom. Several other features separate them from the broadbills, also in the infraorder Eurylaimides: asities possess twelve tail feathers on their extremely short (virtually non-existent in the Philepitta species) tails, their syrinx is encased with a large bronchial ring, and they have forked tongues specially adapted to nectivory. Asities also have a long outer primary feather which buzzes in flight, possibly used in signalling during courtship. The two genera of asities are quite distinct.

== Behavior and ecology ==
=== Diet and feeding ===
The major component of the diet of asities is fruit. A wide range of different fruit is taken by the family, and they are among the most important avian dispersers of seeds, as there are very few other frugivorous birds in the forests of Madagascar. They will also take insects. The Neodrepanis sunbird-asities will take nectar, but do so with a long tongue rather than inserting their curved bills far into flowers.

=== Breeding ===
Rainforest asities breed during the Malagasy rainy season, beginning just before the rains in September to November. The velvet asity begins breeding slightly sooner in the north of its range. That species is the only one for which detailed information about breeding is available. It has a polygynous breeding system, with males holding small territories or leks where they display to passing females. Nest building, incubation, and raising the young is done solely by the females. There are reports of male yellow-bellied sunbird-asities feeding young in the nest and recently fledged chicks, so there is clearly some variation in breeding strategies in the family. The nests of the family are elaborate; pear-shaped woven structures hanging from branches, similar to those of broadbills, although uniquely amongst birds which weave nests the entrance to the nest is created by pushing through the wall after constructed (instead of the usual scenario where the entrance is weaved into the fabric of the nest).

== Status and conservation ==
One species, the yellow-bellied sunbird-asity, is listed as vulnerable by BirdLife International and the IUCN. It was once considered to be an endangered species, and even possibly extinct; however this was due to a lack of ornithological surveys in its high-altitude range. Subsequent research has found it to be more abundant than previously suspected, although it is still considered threatened due to habitat loss and fragmentation. Schlegel's asity is considered near threatened; it has a highly fragmented distribution but numerous strongholds in inaccessible ravines.

== Taxonomy and systematics ==
They were thought to have been related to the pittas, hence the scientific name of the family, but a 1993 study suggested that they are actually just a subfamily of Eurylaimidae. The morphology of the syrinx is very similar to the Grauer's broadbill of Africa. Here they are considered traditionally as a separate family. Some authors have placed the sapayoa of South America in the family, although it is now considered by many to be in its own family, the Sapayoidae.

=== Species ===
Image	Genus	Living species
	Philepitta	Velvet asity, Philepitta castanea; Schlegel's asity, Philepitta schlegeli
	Neodrepanis	Common sunbird-asity, Neodrepanis coruscans; Yellow-bellied sunbird-asity, Neodrepanis hypoxantha
