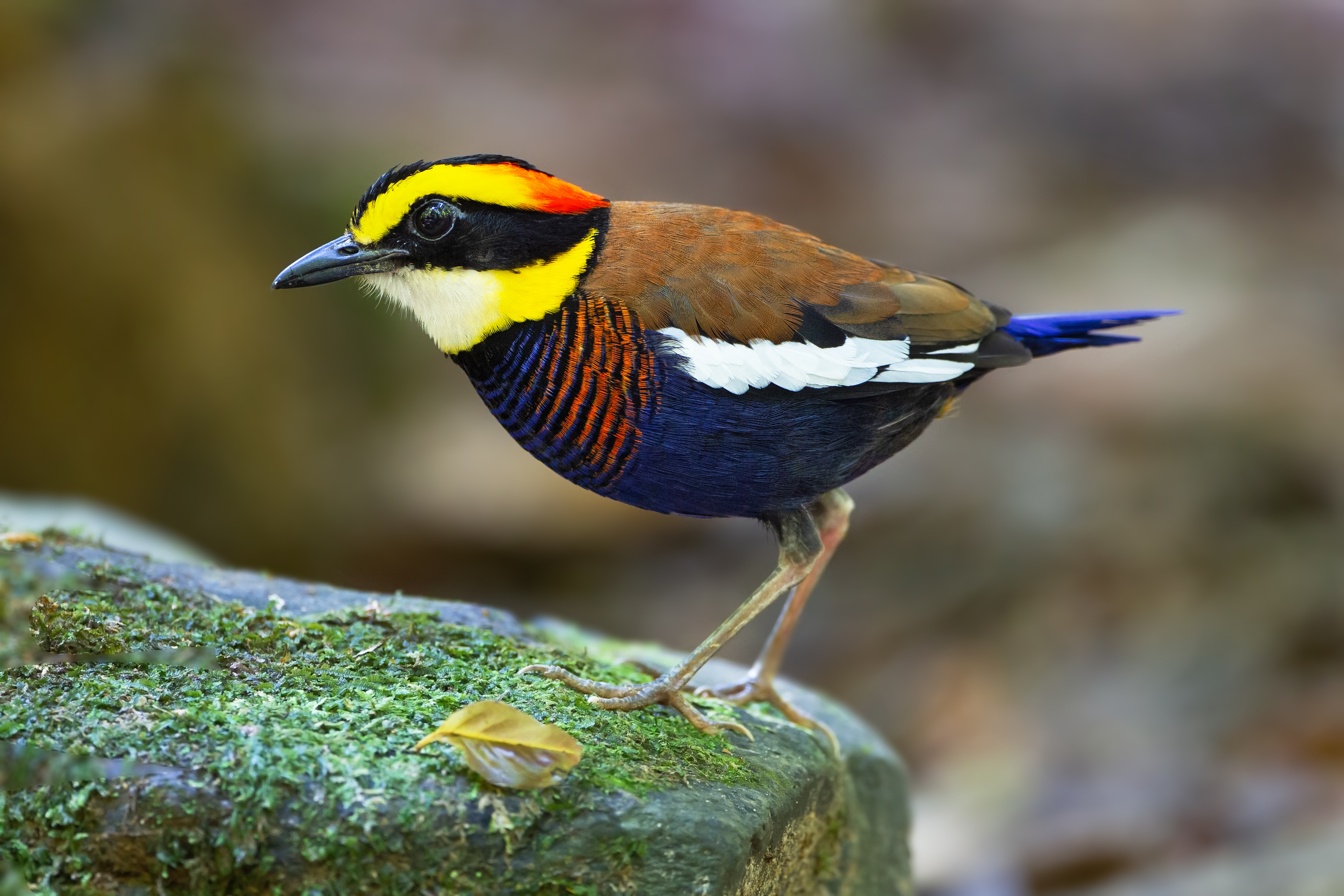
- Malayan banded pitta (Hydrornis irena)

Scientific classification
- Kingdom: Animalia
- Phylum: Chordata
- Class: Aves
- Order: Passeriformes
- Suborder: Tyranni
- Infraorder: Eurylaimides

Families
- Sapayooidea; Sapayoidae; Eurylaimoidea; Eurylaimidae; Calyptomenidae; Pittoidea; Pittidae; Philepittidae

= Eurylaimides =

Infraorder of birds

Eurylaimides (Old World suboscines) is a clade of passerine birds that are distributed in tropical regions around the Indian Ocean, as well as an inland African species, Grauer's broadbill, and a single American species, the sapayoa. This group is divided into five families and three superfamilies. The families listed here are those recognised by the International Ornithologists' Union (IOC).

- Sapayooidea
  - Sapayoidae: broad-billed sapayoa
- Eurylaimoidea
  - Eurylaimidae: typical broadbills
  - Calyptomenidae: African and green broadbills
- Pittoidea
  - Pittidae: pittas
  - Philepittidae: asities

Phylogenetic relationships of the Eurylaimides based on Oliveros et al. (2019):

- Eurylaimides
  - - Philepittidae (asities)
    - Eurylaimidae (eurylaimid broadbills)
  - - Calyptomenidae (African and green broadbills)
    - - Sapayoidae (sapayoa)
      - Pittidae (pittas)

== Historical classification ==
This clade was previously classified into two superfamilies:

- Superfamily Eurylaimoidea
  - Philepittidae: asities
  - Eurylaimidae: typical broadbills
  - Calyptomenidae: African and green broadbills
  - Sapayoidae: sapayoa
- Superfamily Pittoidea
  - Pittidae: pittas

The monotypic Sapayoidae family (consisting only of a single species, the sapayoa) has since been moved into its own superfamily of Sapayooidea. Additionally, Philepittidae (asities) has been moved into the superfamily of Pittoidea along with Pittidae (pittas).
