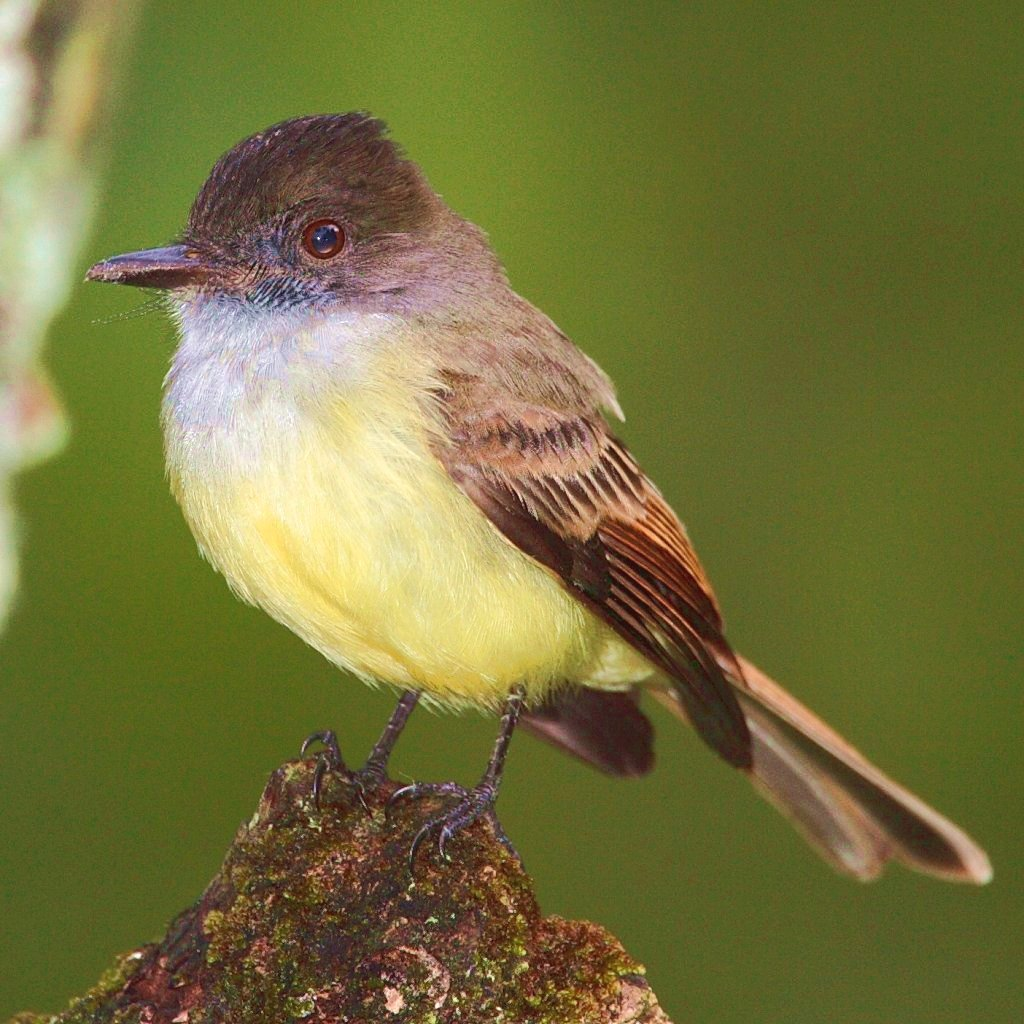
- Dusky-capped flycatcher (Myiarchus tuberculifer)

Scientific classification
- Kingdom: Animalia
- Phylum: Chordata
- Class: Aves
- Order: Passeriformes
- Clade: Eupasseres
- Suborder: Tyranni

Infraorders
- Eurylaimides; Tyrannides

= Tyranni =

Tyranni Temporal range: Early Oligocene–present

Suborder of birds

The Tyranni (suboscines) are a suborder of passerine birds that includes more than 1,000 species, a large majority of which are South American. It is named after the type genus Tyrannus. These have a different anatomy of the syrinx musculature than the oscines (songbirds of the larger suborder Passeri), hence the common name of suboscines.

The suboscines originated in South America about 50 million years ago and dispersed into the Old World likely via a trans-Atlantic route during the Oligocene. Their presence in the early Oligocene of Europe is well documented by several fossil specimens.

== Systematics ==
The suborder Tyranni is divided into two infraorders: the Eurylaimides and the Tyrannides. The New Zealand wrens in the family Acanthisittidae are placed in a separate suborder Acanthisitti.

The phylogenetic relationships of the 16 families in the Tyranni suborder is shown below. The cladogram is based on a large molecular genetic study by Carl Oliveros and collaborators published in 2019: The families and the species numbers are from the taxonomy published by AviList in 2025.

- Tyranni
  - Eurylaimides
    - - Philepittidae – 4 species (asities)
      - Eurylaimidae – 10 species (eurylaimid broadbills)
    - - Calyptomenidae – 6 species (Asian green broadbills)
      - - Sapayoidae – 1 species (sapayoa)
        - Pittidae – 46 species (pittas)
  - Tyrannides
    - Tyrannoidea
      - Pipridae – 55 species (manakins)
      - - Cotingidae – 66 species (cotingas)
        - - Tityridae – 36 species (tityras, becards)
          - Tyrannidae – 441 species (tyrant flycatchers)
    - - Conophagoidea
        - Melanopareiidae – 4 species (crescentchests)
        - - Conopophagidae – 12 species (gnateaters)
          - Thamnophilidae – 239 species (antbirds)
      - Furnarioidea
        - Grallariidae – 70 species (antpittas)
        - - Rhinocryptidae – 65 species (tapaculos)
          - - Formicariidae – 12 species (antthrushes)
            - Furnariidae – 321 species (ovenbirds)

The Eurylaimides contain the Old World suboscines – mainly distributed in tropical regions around the Indian Ocean – and a single American species, the sapayoa:

- Sapayooidea
  - Sapayoidae: broad-billed sapayoa
- Eurylaimoidea
  - Eurylaimidae: typical broadbills
  - Calyptomenidae: African and green broadbills
- Pittoidea
  - Pittidae: pittas
  - Philepittidae: asities

The Tyrannides contain all the suboscines from the Americas except the broad-billed sapayoa. The families listed here are those recognised by the International Ornithologists' Union.

- Tyrannoidea
  - Pipridae: manakins
  - Cotingidae: cotingas
  - Tityridae: tityras, sharpbill, becards (includes Oxyruncus and Onychorhynchus)
  - Tyrannidae: tyrant-flycatchers (includes Piprites, Platyrinchus, Tachuris and Rhynchocyclus)
- Conophagoidea
  - Melanopareiidae: crescent chests
  - Conopophagidae: gnateaters and gnatpittas
  - Thamnophilidae: antbirds
- Furnarioidea
  - Grallariidae: antpittas
  - Rhinocryptidae: tapaculos
  - Formicariidae: antthrushes
  - Furnariidae: ovenbirds and woodcreepers (includes Dendrocolaptidae)

This group has been separated into three parvorders by Sibley & Ahlquist. However, DNA:DNA hybridization did not reliably resolve the suboscine phylogeny. It was eventually determined that there was a simple dichotomy between the antbirds and allies (tracheophones), and the tyrant-flycatchers and allies. Given that the "parvorder" arrangement originally advanced is obsolete (see e.g. Irestedt et al. 2002 for tracheophone phylogeny) — more so if the Eurylaimides are elevated to a distinct suborder — it is better to rank the clades as superfamilies or, if the broadbill group is considered a separate suborder, as infraorders. In the former case, the name Furnarioidea would be available for the tracheophones, whereas "Tyrannoidea", the "bronchophone" equivalent, has not yet been formally defined. In the latter case, the tracheophones would be classified as "Furnariides", while the Tyrannides would be restricted to the tyrant-flycatchers and other "bronchophone" families.

The tracheophones contain the Furnariidae, Thamnophilidae, Formicariidae (probably including most tapaculos), and Conopophagidae. The tyrant-flycatcher clade includes the namesake family, the Tityridae, the Cotingidae, and the Pipridae.

Extinct members of the Tyranni include Crosnoornis and Jamninkaornis, both known from fossils found in Poland, and Wieslochia, known from German fossils. All three genera are known from rocks dated to the Oligocene epoch.
