= 1885 in birding and ornithology =

- Years in birding and ornithology: 1882 1883 1884 1885 1886 1887 1888
- Centuries: 18th century · 19th century · 20th century
- Decades: 1850s 1860s 1870s 1880s 1890s 1900s 1910s
- Years: 1882 1883 1884 1885 1886 1887 1888

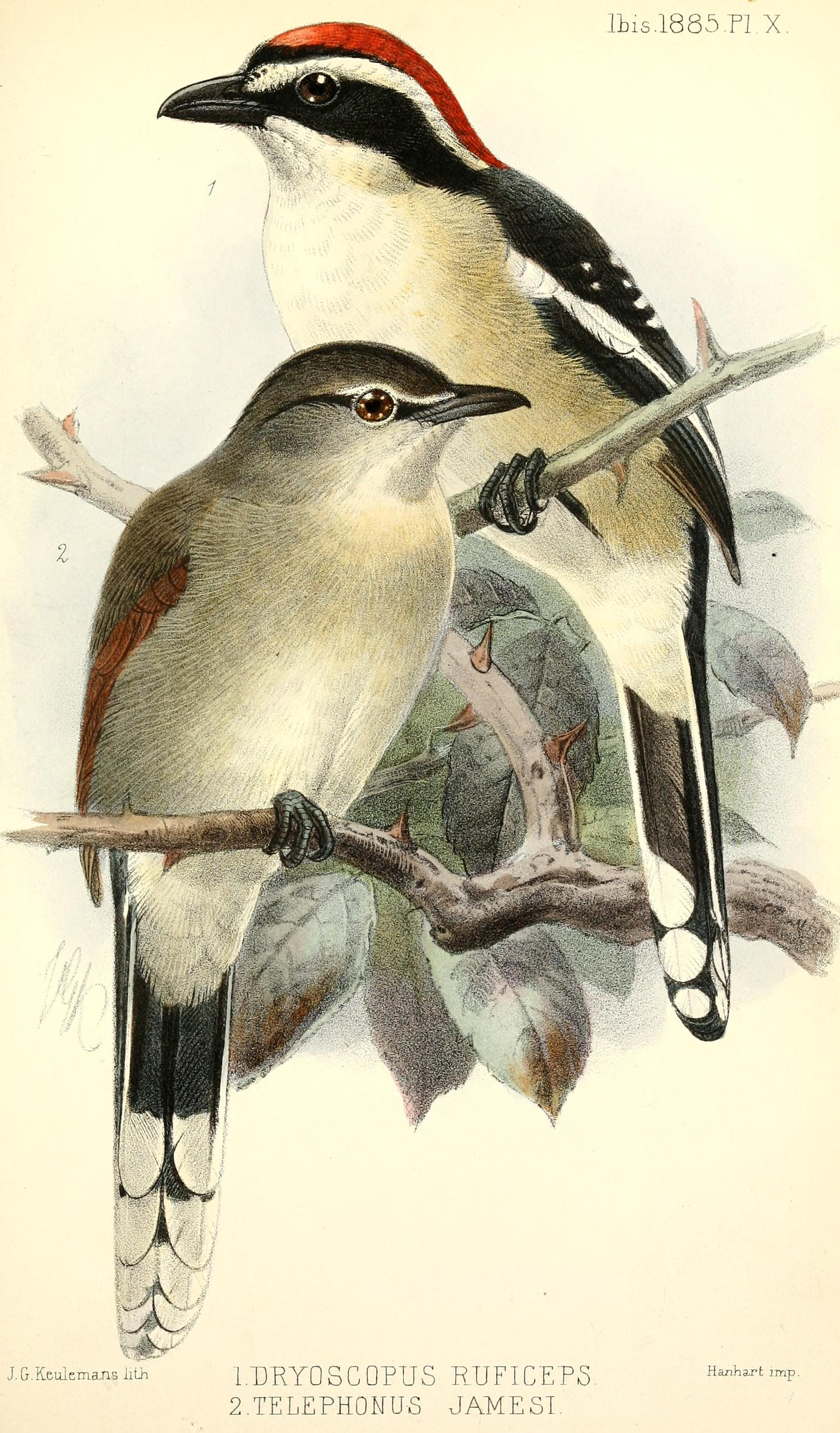
red-naped bushshrike Ibis 1885

Birds described in 1885 include semicollared flycatcher, Palawan hornbill, blue bird-of-paradise, lesser lophorina, brown sicklebill, Comoros cuckooshrike, Cozumel vireo, Indochinese green magpie, three-streaked tchagra, Lawes's parotia, Turquoise-winged parrotlet

== Events ==
- Death of Samuel Cabot III, Nikolai Severtzov
- William Brewster becomes curator of mammals and birds at the Museum of Comparative Zoology.
- John Whitehead begins exploring in Malacca, North Borneo, Java, and Palawan.
- Ornis; internationale Zeitschrift für die gesammte Ornithologie.Vienna 1885-1905 online BHL commences.

== Publications ==
- Bradford Torrey Birds in the Bush
- Otto Finsch and Adolf Bernhard Meyer, 1885. Vögel von Neu Guinea, zumeist aus der Alpen-region am südostabhange des Owen-Stanley-Gebirges (Hufeisengebirge 7000-8000' hoch), gesammelt von Karl Hunstein. I. Paradiseidae. Zeitschrift für die gesammte Ornithologie 2: 369–391. online
- Leonhard Stejneger ,1885. Results of ornithological explorations in the Commander Islands and in Kamtschatka. Bulletin of the United States National Museum. 1–382, 8 figs, 8 pls. online
- Robert Ridgway Description of some new species of birds from Cozumel Island, Yucatán Proceedings of the Biological Society of Washington 1885 3: 2–24.online
- Osbert Salvin A List of the Birds obtained by Mr. Henry Whitely in British Guiana.Ibis 1885 3 (5) :291-306 online
- Richard Bowdler Sharpe A Monograph of the Hirundinidae. (2 volumes). (with Claude Wilmot Wyatt). London: Printed for the authors. 1885–1894. (Vol. 1, Vol. 2) online BHL

Ongoing events

- Osbert Salvin and Frederick DuCane Godman 1879–1904. Biologia Centrali-Americana. Aves
- Richard Bowdler Sharpe Catalogue of the Birds in the British Museum London,1874-98.
- Cabanis, Anton Reichenow, Hans von Berlepsch, and other members of the German Ornithologists' Society in Journal für Ornithologie online BHL
- The Auk online BHL
- The Ibis
