= 1877 in birding and ornithology =

- Years in birding and ornithology: 1874 1875 1876 1877 1878 1879 1880
- Centuries: 18th century · 19th century · 20th century
- Decades: 1840s 1850s 1860s 1870s 1880s 1890s 1900s
- Years: 1874 1875 1876 1877 1878 1879 1880

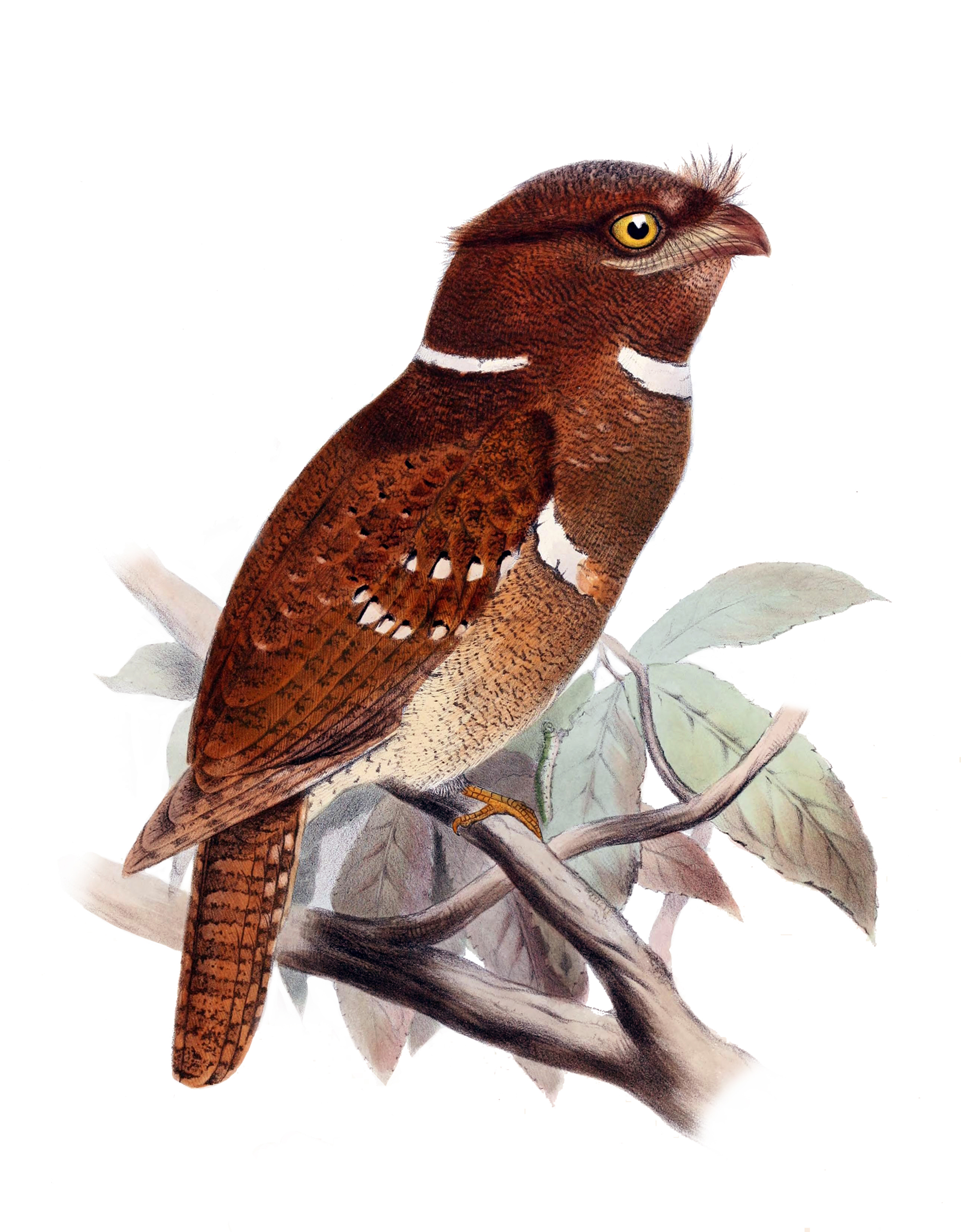
Philippine frogmouth from the Report On the Scientific Results of the Voyage of H.M.S. Challenger During the Years 1873-76, illustrated by Joseph Smit.

Birds described in 1877 include the giant ibis, black-and-yellow phainoptila, Cebu flowerpecker, Drakensberg prinia, Finsch's euphonia, lava heron, Manus friarbird, Palawan tit, plain-backed antpitta, rufous-fronted tailorbird and Walden's hornbill.

== Events ==
- Death of Matteo Botteri
- Death of Robert Swinhoe
- James Edmund Fotheringham Harting becomes editor of The Zoologist (until 1896)

== Publications ==
- Jean-Frédéric Émile Oustalet with Armand David, Les Oiseaux de la Chine, (The Birds of China, two volumes).
- Richard Bowdler Sharpe Catalogue of the Passeriformes, or perching birds, in the collection of the British Museum. Coliomorphae... (1877).
- Arthur, Marquis of Tweeddale 1877. Reports on the collections of birds made during the voyage of H.M.S. Challenger - No. II. On the birds of the Philippine Islands. Proceedings of the Zoological Society of London 1877 (III): 535–551.
- José Vicente Barbosa du Bocage Ornithologie d'Angola. 2 volumes, 1877–1881.
- Gustav Hartlaub 1877. Die Vögel Madagascars und der benachbarten Inselgruppen. Ein Beitrag zur Zoologie der äthiopischen Region.Halle :H.W. Schmidt,1877. online BHL
- Jean Cabanis and other members of the German Ornithologists' Society in Ornithologisches Centralblatt Leipzig :L.A. Kittler,1876-82. online
- John Gould; The Birds of New Guinea and the Adjacent Papuan Islands, including many new species recently discovered in Australia; 1875–88. 5 vols. 300 plates; Parts 13–25 completed after Gould's death by R. Bowdler Sharpe; Artists: J. Gould and W. Hart; Lithographer: W. Hart

== Ongoing events ==
- John Gould The Birds of Asia 1850-83 7 vols. 530 plates, Artists: J. Gould, H. C. Richter, W. Hart and J. Wolf; Lithographers: H. C. Richter and W. Hart
- Henry Eeles Dresser and Richard Bowdler Sharpe A History of the Birds of Europe, Including all the Species Inhabiting the Western Palearctic Region. Taylor & Francis of Fleet Street, London
- Etienne Mulsant, Histoire Naturelle des Oiseaux-Mouches, ou Colibris constituant la famille des Trochilides (published 1874–77)
- The Ibis
