= 1881 in birding and ornithology =

- Years in birding and ornithology: 1878 1879 1880 1881 1882 1883 1884
- Centuries: 18th century · 19th century · 20th century
- Decades: 1850s 1860s 1870s 1880s 1890s 1900s 1910s
- Years: 1878 1879 1880 1881 1882 1883 1884

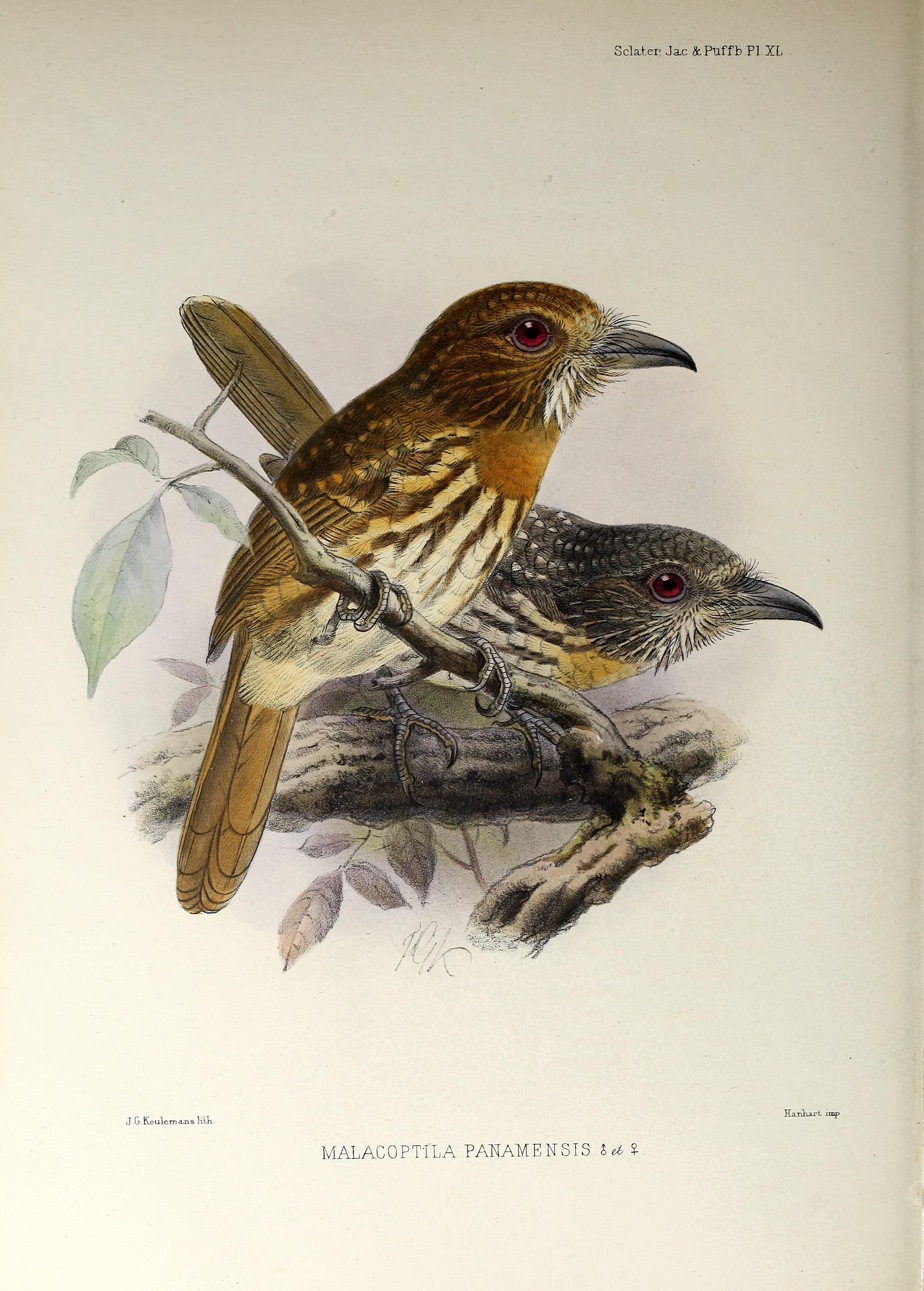
A monograph of the jacamars and puff-birds White-whiskered puffbird

- Birds described in 1881 include Cory's shearwater, Royal parrotfinch, Sulu pygmy woodpecker, Coppery emerald, Mexican whip-poor-will, Sepia-brown wren, Socotra warbler, Fiery-shouldered parakeet, Mrs. Hume's pheasant, Socotra golden-winged grosbeak, Blue-rumped pitta,

== Events ==
- Death of John Gould and Louis Hippolyte Bouteille
- Last specimens of Seychelles parakeet collected

== Publications ==
- Philip Lutley Sclater Monograph of the Jacamars and Puff-birds.
- Philip Lutley Sclater and Gustav Hartlaub. On the Birds collected in Socotra by Prof. I. B. Balfour. Proceedings of the Zoological Society of London 1881 online
- Robert George Wardlaw-Ramsay The Ornithological works of Arthur 9th Marquis of Tweeddale (1881)
- Jean Cabanis, Anton Reichenow, Herman Schalow, Gustav Hartlaub and other Germans in Ornithologisches Centralblatt Leipzig :L.A. Kittler,1876-82. online

Ongoing events

- John Gould The birds of Asia 1850-83 7 vols. 530 plates, Artists: J. Gould, H. C. Richter, W. Hart and J. Wolf; Lithographers:H. C. Richter and W. Hart
- Henry Eeles Dresser and Richard Bowdler Sharpe A History of the Birds of Europe, Including all the Species Inhabiting the Western Palearctic Region.Taylor & Francis of Fleet Street, London
- José Vicente Barbosa du Bocage Ornithologie d'Angola. 2 volumes, 1877–1881.
- Osbert Salvin and Frederick DuCane Godman 1879–1904. Biologia Centrali-Americana . Aves
- Richard Bowdler Sharpe Catalogue of the Birds in the British Museum London,1874-98.
- Jean Cabanis, Gustav Hartlaub, Otto Finsch and other members of the German Ornithologists' Society in Journal für Ornithologie online BHL
- The Ibis
