= 1884 in birding and ornithology =

- Years in birding and ornithology: 1881 1882 1883 1884 1885 1886 1887
- Centuries: 18th century · 19th century · 20th century
- Decades: 1850s 1860s 1870s 1880s 1890s 1900s 1910s
- Years: 1881 1882 1883 1884 1885 1886 1887

See also 1883 in birding and ornithology, main events of 1884 and 1885 in birding and ornithology

The year 1884 in birding and ornithology.

== Worldwide ==
=== New species ===
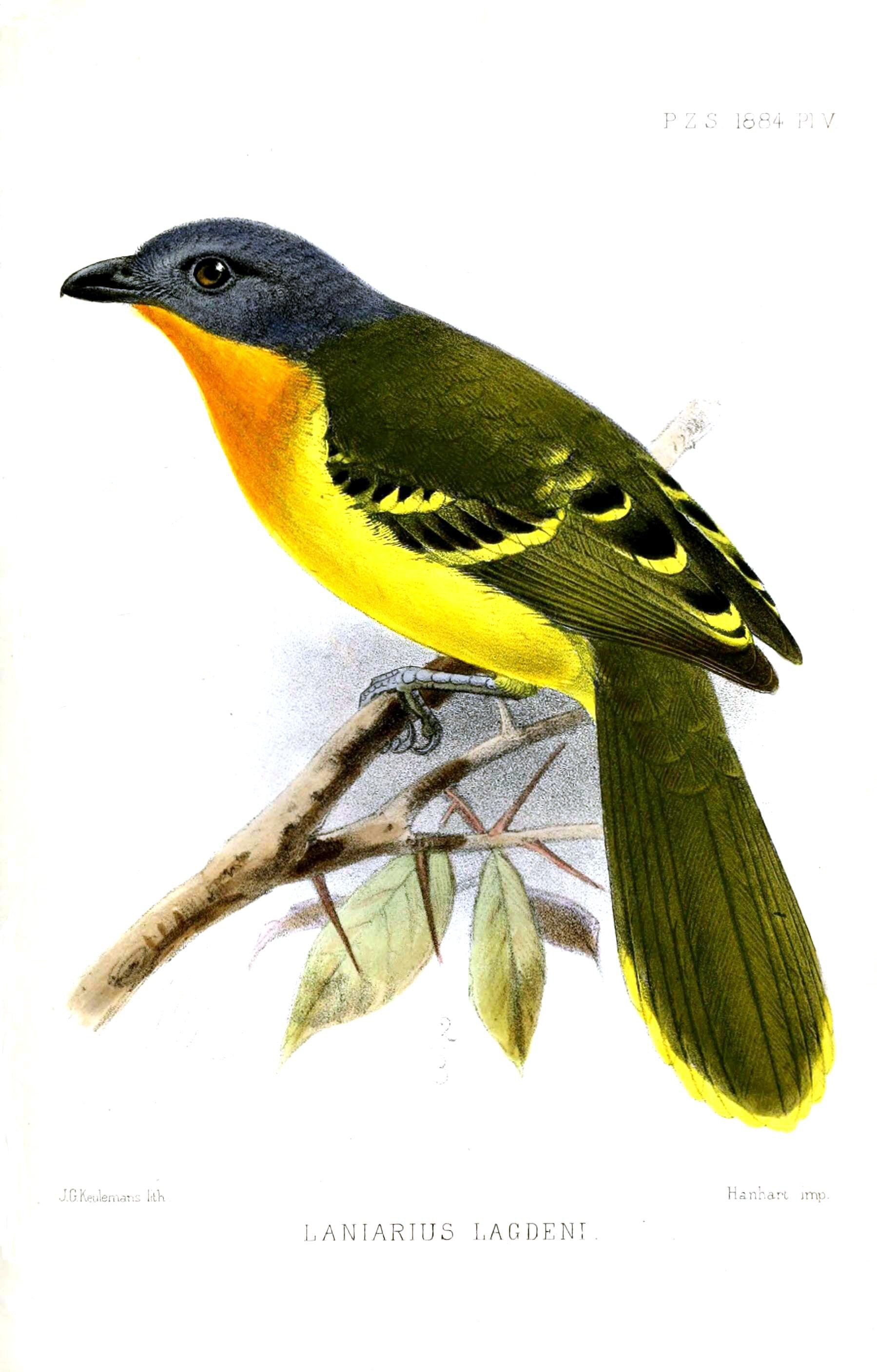
Lagden's bush-shrike Proceedings of the Zoological Society of London. 1884

- Birds described in 1884 include Blakiston's fish owl, grey-crowned flatbill, rose-collared piha, St Kilda wren, Corsican nuthatch, golden-winged sunbird, Fischer's starling, Streak-backed antshrike, Lagden's bushshrike, Timor stubtail, brown lory, black-capped social weaver, Böhm's flycatcher

=== Events ===
- Léon Olphe-Galliard begins publishing papers on European birds.
- First meeting of International Ornithological Committee
- Gyula Madarász founds the German-language ornithological journal Zeitschrift für die gesamte Ornithologie
- Carl August Bolle becomes Chairman of Deutsche Ornithologen-Gesellschaft
- The Auk, the official publication of the American Ornithological Society (AOS) established

=== Ornithologists ===
==== Deaths ====
- Hermann Schlegel (10 June 1804 – 17 January 1884)

== Publications ==
- Władysław Taczanowski, 1884. Ornithologie du Pérou. R. Friedländer & Sohn. Berlin. Vol 2: 566 pp.
- George Ernest Shelley On five new or little-known Species of East-African Birds, represented in Mr. H. H. Johnston's First Collection from the Kilimanjaro District Proceedings of the Zoological Society of London. 1884:554-558
- Henry Eeles Dresser, A Monograph of the Meropidae, or Family of the Bee-eaters. London: self-published.(1884–1886)
- Gustav Fischer with Anton Reichenow in Journal für Ornithologie online BHL

Ongoing events

- Osbert Salvin and Frederick DuCane Godman 1879–1904. Biologia Centrali-Americana . Aves
- Richard Bowdler Sharpe Catalogue of the Birds in the British Museum London,1874–98.
- The Ibis
- Members of the German Ornithologists' Society in Journal für Ornithologie
