= 1880 in birding and ornithology =

- Years in birding and ornithology: 1877 1878 1879 1880 1881 1882 1883
- Centuries: 18th century · 19th century · 20th century
- Decades: 1850s 1860s 1870s 1880s 1890s 1900s 1910s
- Years: 1877 1878 1879 1880 1881 1882 1883

The year 1880 in birding and ornithology.

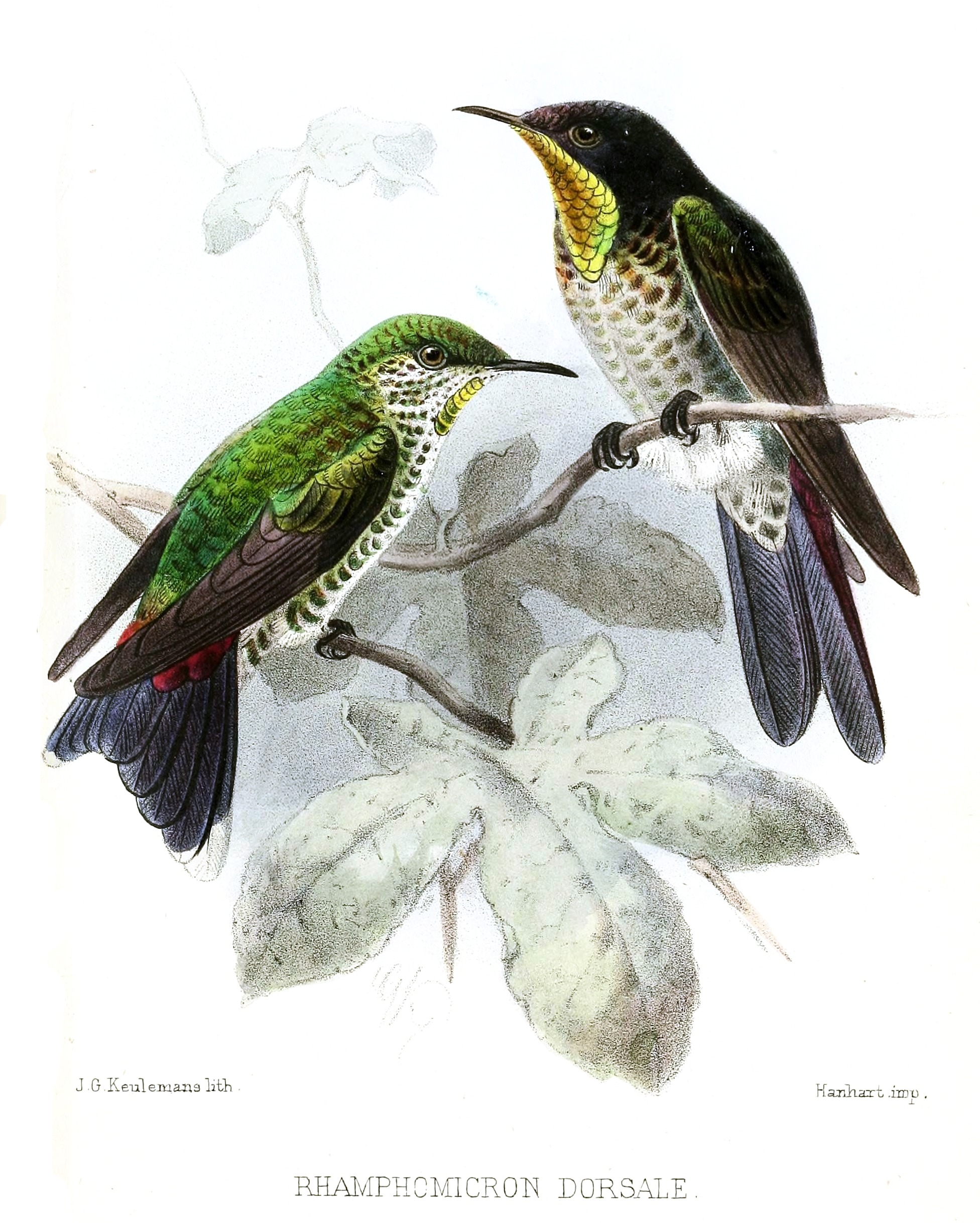
Black-backed thornbill

- Birds described in 1880 include Rufous-fronted parakeet, Racket-tailed roller, Buff-bellied mannikin, Orange-crested manakin, Pale-billed sicklebill, Waigeo brushturkey, Ashambu laughingthrush, Eastern violet-backed sunbird, Black bishop.

== Events ==
- Death of Étienne Mulsant
- William Brewster appointed assistant in charge of the collection of birds and mammals in the Boston Society of Natural History

== Publications ==
- Osbert Salvin and Frederick DuCane Godman, 1880 On the birds of the Sierra Nevada of Santa Marta, Colombia The Ibis ( 4 ). Band 4, 1880, S. 169–178
- Philip Sclater and Osbert Salvin 1880 On the Birds collected by Mr. C. Buckley in Eastern Equador. Proceedings of the Zoological Society of London Pt.2: 155–160.
- Othniel Charles Marsh Odontornithes: a monograph on the extinct toothed birds of North America; with thirty-four plates and forty woodcuts, Washington :Govt. print. off.,1880.
- Charles B. Cory Birds of the Bahama islands; containing many birds new to the islands, and a number of undescribed winter plumages of North American species (Boston, 1880).

Ongoing events

- John Gould The birds of Asia 1850-83 7 vols. 530 plates, Artists: J. Gould, H. C. Richter, W. Hart and J. Wolf; Lithographers:H. C. Richter and W. Hart
- Henry Eeles Dresser and Richard Bowdler Sharpe A History of the Birds of Europe, Including all the Species Inhabiting the Western Palearctic Region.Taylor & Francis of Fleet Street, London
- José Vicente Barbosa du Bocage Ornithologie d'Angola. 2 volumes, 1877–1881.
- Osbert Salvin and Frederick DuCane Godman 1879–1904. Biologia Centrali-Americana . Aves
- Richard Bowdler Sharpe Catalogue of the Birds in the British Museum London,1874-98.
- Gustav Hartlaub, Jean Cabanis, Otto Finsch and other members of the German Ornithologists' Society in Journal für Ornithologie online BHL
- The Ibis
