= 1882 in birding and ornithology =

- Years in birding and ornithology: 1879 1880 1881 1882 1883 1884 1885
- Centuries: 18th century · 19th century · 20th century
- Decades: 1850s 1860s 1870s 1880s 1890s 1900s 1910s
- Years: 1879 1880 1881 1882 1883 1884 1885

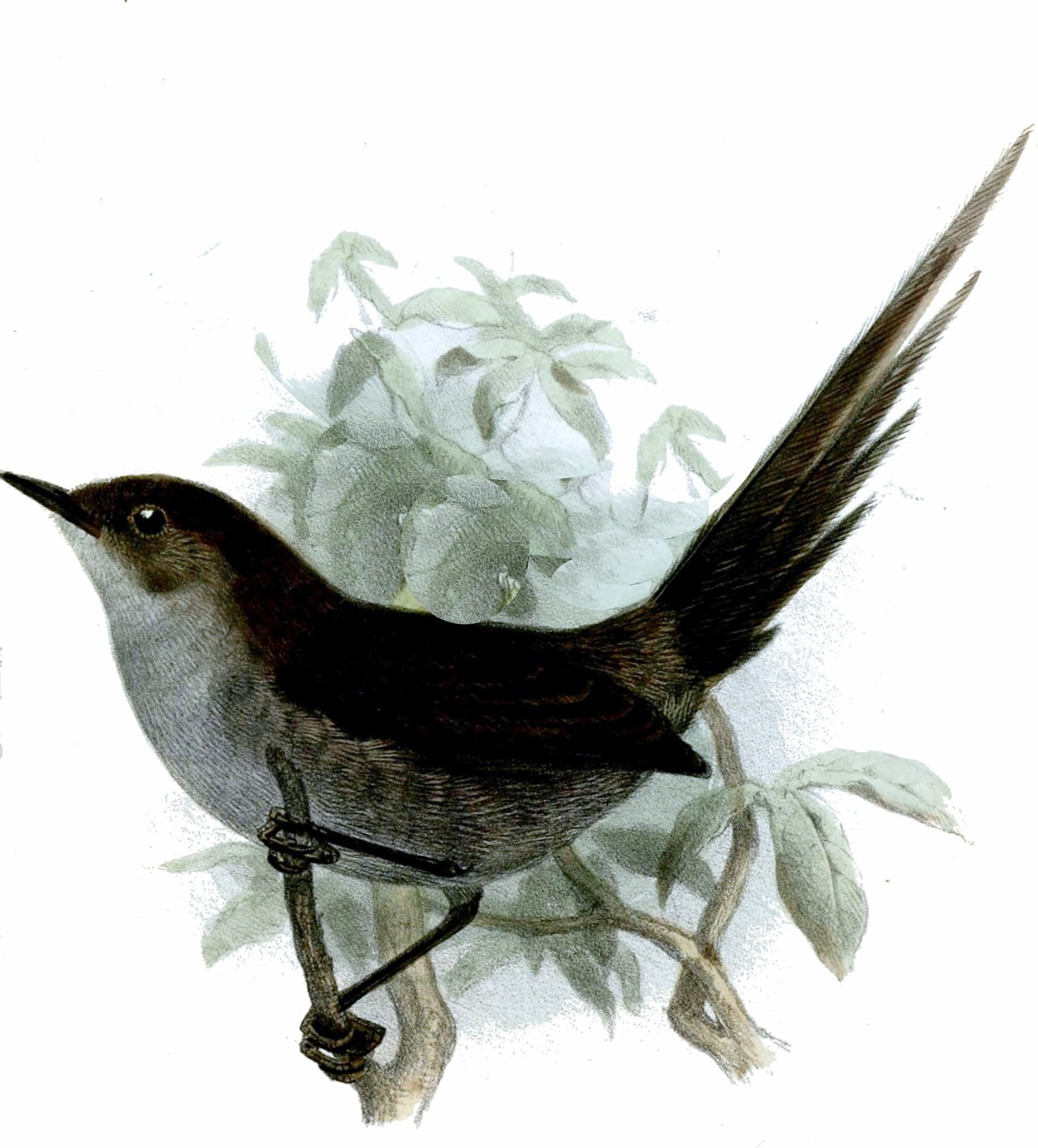
mouse-colored thistletail in Proceedings of the Zoological Society

- Birds described in 1882 include Blue-footed booby, Somali bee-eater, Growling riflebird, Mouse-coloured penduline tit, Orange-bellied manakin, Ouvea parakeet, Peacock coquette, Reichard's seedeater, Silver-capped fruit dove, Speckle-chested piculet, Tepui toucanet

== Events ==
- Death of Norman Boyd Kinnear and Charles Darwin
- Museo Civico di Storia Naturale di Milano built to house the collection of Hercules Turati
- Anton Reichenow names Böhm's bee-eater to honour Richard Böhm

== Publications ==
- William Alexander Forbes, 1882. Report on the anatomy of the petrels (Tubinares) collected during the voyage of H.M.S. Challenger, in the years 1873-1876. Reports of Science Research Voyage of H.M.S. Challenger. Zoology. 4(11): 1–64.
- Georges Révoil, J Terrier, Charles Emile Cuisin, A Franchet Faune et flore des pays Çomalis (Afrique orientale) Paris : Challamel Ainé, Éditeur, 1882.
- Mission scientifique du cap Horn, 1882–1883. - France. - France. Ministère de la marine - France. Ministère de l'éducation nationale'Paris :Gauthier-Villars,1885-1891.
- Anton Reichenow Conspectus Psittacorum : systematische Uebersicht aller bekannten Papageienarten Berlin : A. Reichenow,1882. online BHL

Ongoing events

- John Gould The birds of Asia 1850-83 7 vols. 530 plates, Artists: J. Gould, H. C. Richter, W. Hart and J. Wolf; Lithographers:H. C. Richter and W. Hart
- Osbert Salvin and Frederick DuCane Godman 1879–1904. Biologia Centrali-Americana . Aves
- Richard Bowdler Sharpe Catalogue of the Birds in the British Museum London,1874-98.
- Jean Cabanis, Anton Reichenow and other members of the German Ornithologists' Society in Journal für Ornithologie online BHL
- Jean Cabanis, Anton Reichenow, Herman Schalow, Gustav Hartlaub and other members of the German Ornithologists' Society in Ornithologisches Centralblatt Leipzig :L.A. Kittler,1876-82. online
- The Ibis
