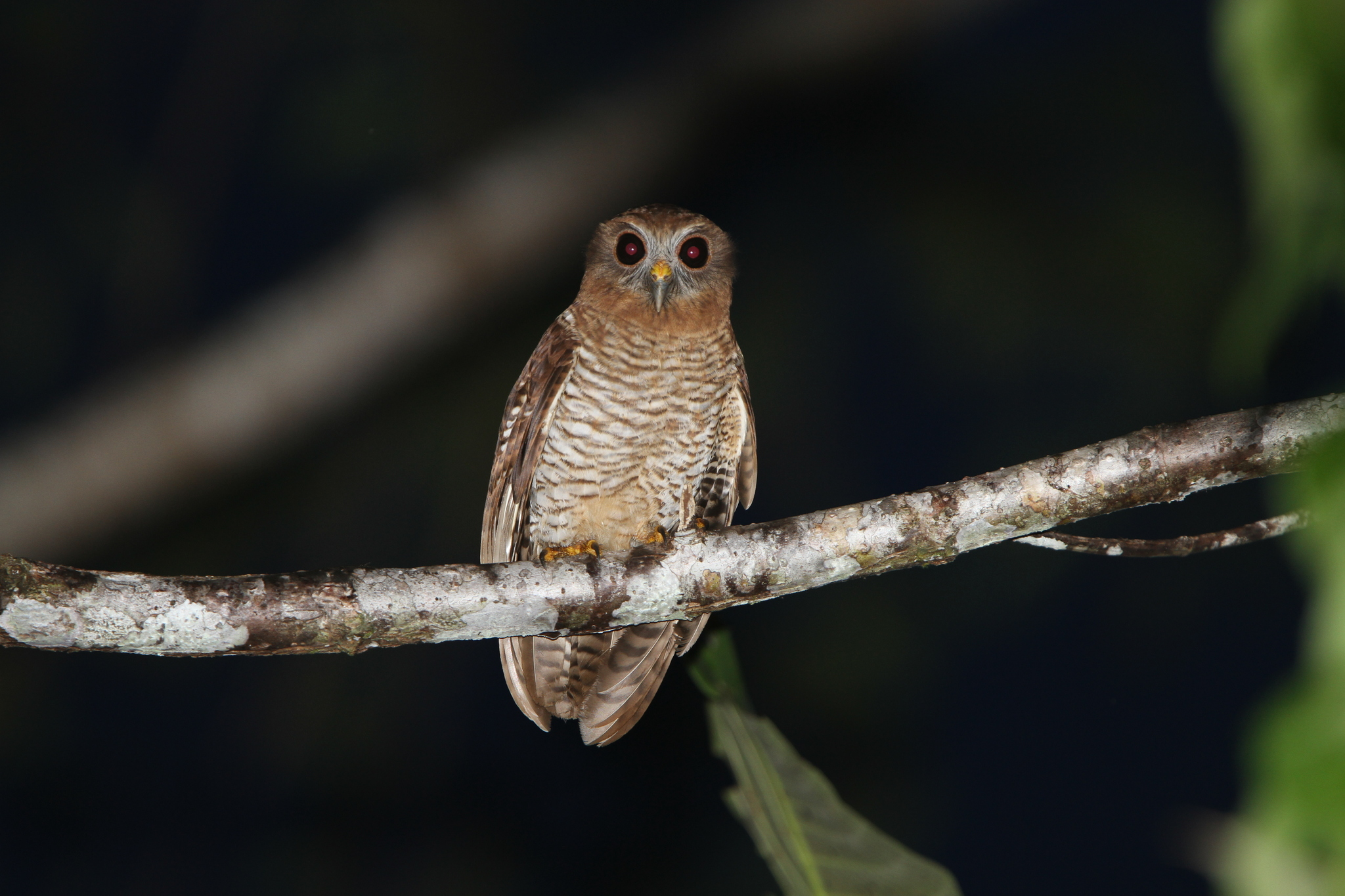

Conservation status
- Least Concern (IUCN 3.1)
- CITES Appendix II

Scientific classification
- Kingdom: Animalia
- Phylum: Chordata
- Class: Aves
- Order: Strigiformes
- Family: Strigidae
- Genus: Ninox
- Species: N. squamipila

Binomial name
- Ninox squamipila (Bonaparte, 1850)

= Seram boobook =

Species of owl

The Seram boobook (Ninox squamipila), also Hantu boobook, Moluccan boobook or Moluccan hawk owl, is a species of owl in the family Strigidae. It is found on the Indonesian islands of Seram, Kelang and Ambon. Its natural habitat is subtropical or tropical moist lowland forests. It is threatened by habitat loss. It used to be considered a subspecies of the Moluccan boobook.

It is known to make loud vocalizations in the early evening.

It eats wild rats and snakes.

== Taxonomy ==
The Seram boobook is part of a species complex that comprises four species. All four species used to be considered as part of a single species, the Moluccan boobook, which was classified under the scientific name Ninox squamipila used in a broader sense.

The four species of Moluccan boobook currently recognised are:

- Ninox squamipila (Bonaparte, 1850) - Seram boobook - Seram Island in the southern Maluku Islands
- Ninox forbesi (PL Sclater, 1883) - Tanimbar boobook - Tanimbar Islands
- Ninox hypogramma (GR Gray, 1861) - Halmahera boobook - northern Maluku Islands of Halmahera, Ternate, and Bacan
- Ninox hantu (Wallace, 1863) - Buru boobook - Buru Island in the southern Maluku Islands
