= 1879 in birding and ornithology =

- Years in birding and ornithology: 1876 1877 1878 1879 1880 1881 1882
- Centuries: 18th century · 19th century · 20th century
- Decades: 1840s 1850s 1860s 1870s 1880s 1890s 1900s
- Years: 1876 1877 1878 1879 1880 1881 1882

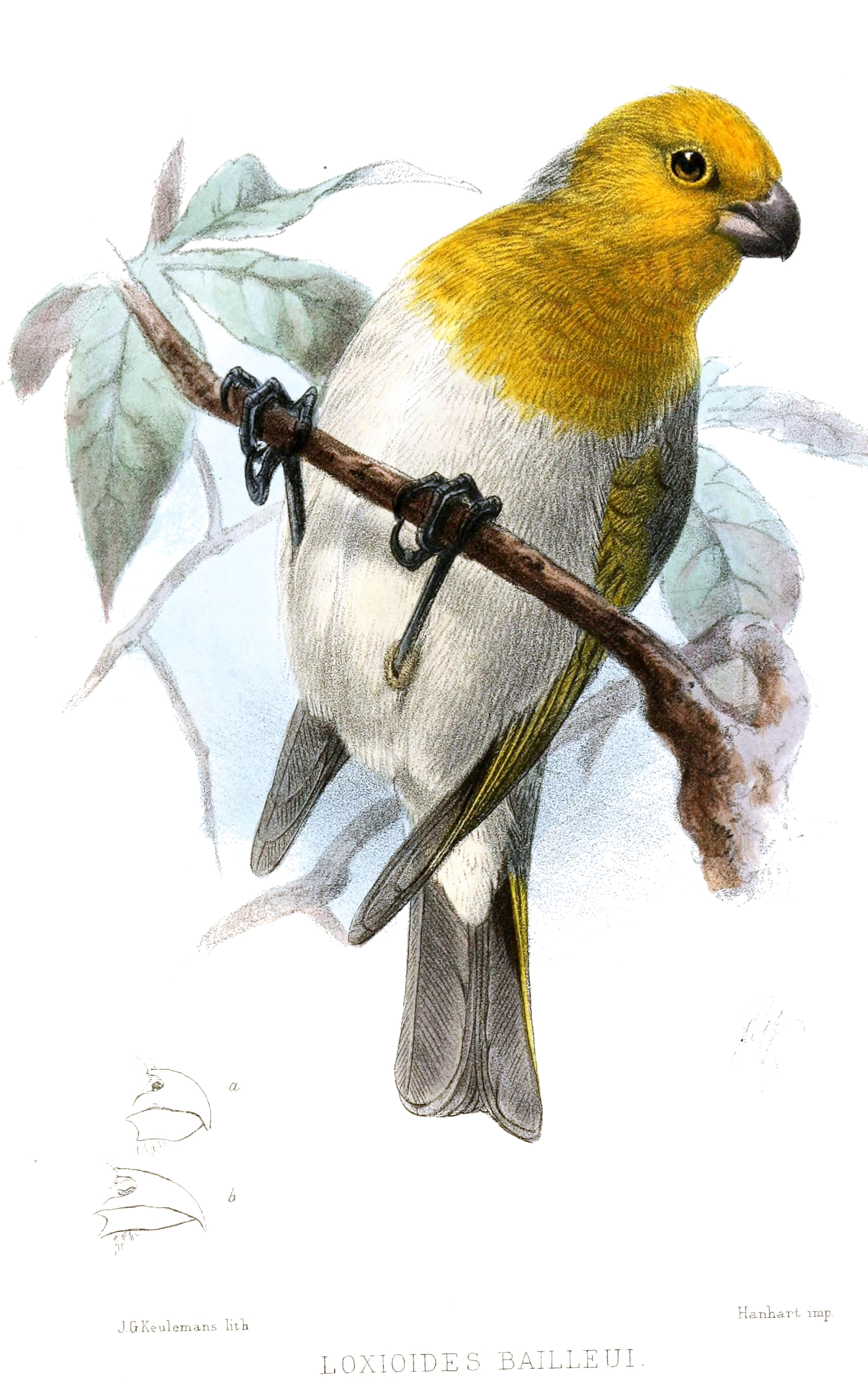
A palila (Loxioides bailleui) in The Ibis 1879

Birds described in 1879 include the grey-headed silverbill, Macquarie rail, flame bowerbird, Cockerell's fantail, rufous-vented niltava, slaty cuckooshrike, Makira dwarf kingfisher, black-billed turaco, dusky-backed jacamar, buff-bellied tanager and the Santa Marta sabrewing, Rodrigues starling.

== Events ==
- Death of Ludwig Reichenbach.
- Johann Büttikofer begins exploring Liberia.

== Publications ==
- Luigi D'Albertis (1879). "Journeys up the Fly River and in other parts of New Guinea". Proceedings of the Royal Geographical Society: 4–16 (including map).
- Anton Reichenow (1879). "Neue Vögel aus Ostafrika". Ornithologisches Centralblatt. 4: 107–155.
- Władysław Taczanowski (1879). "Liste des Oiseaux recueillis au nord du Pérou par M.M. Stolzmann et Jelski em 1878". Proceedings of the Zoological Society of London. Part 2: 220–245.
- Osbert Salvin and Frederick DuCane Godman (1879–1904). Biologia Centrali-Americana. Aves. Vol.1: i–xliv; 1–512.
- Genevieve Estelle Jones (1879–1886). Illustrations of the Nests and Eggs of Birds of Ohio.
- Adolf Bernhard Meyer Abbildungen von Vogelskeletten (1879–95).Volume 1, Volume 2. (in German).
- Alfred Grandidier Histoire physique, naturelle, et politique de Madagascar Paris :Impr. nationale online BHL Oiseaux vols 12-15 1879-1881

== Ongoing events ==
- John Gould The Birds of Asia 1850–83 7 vols. 530 plates, Artists: J. Gould, H. C. Richter, W. Hart and J. Wolf; Lithographers: H. C. Richter and W. Hart
- Henry Eeles Dresser and Richard Bowdler Sharpe A History of the Birds of Europe, Including all the Species Inhabiting the Western Palearctic Region. Taylor & Francis of Fleet Street, London
- José Vicente Barbosa du Bocage Ornithologie d'Angola. 2 volumes, 1877–1881.
- The Ibis
