= 1886 in birding and ornithology =

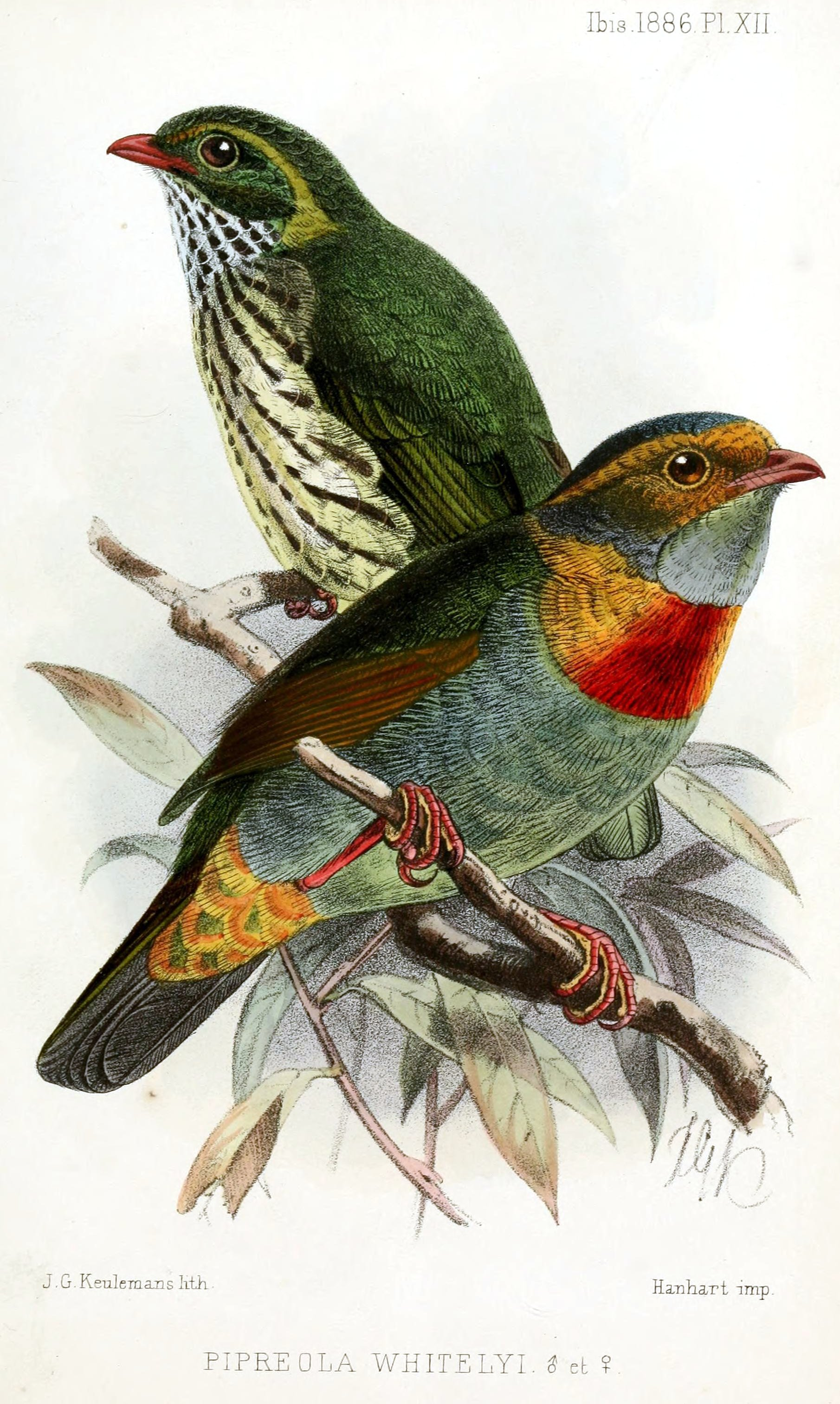
Red-banded fruiteater

Birds described in 1886 include: Arizona woodpecker; blue ground dove; Brazza's martin;common smoky honeyeater; dark hawk-cuckoo;double-banded greytail; blue-breasted blue flycatcher; snoring rail; point-tailed palmcreeper; and little minivet.

== Events ==
- Death of Eugen von Boeck,
- Clinton Hart Merriam becomes the first chief of the Division of Economic Ornithology and Mammalogy of the United States Department of Agriculture.
- George Arthur Keartland joins the Field Naturalists Club of Victoria.

== Publications ==
- Herman Schalow Die Musophagidae (1886)
- Władysław Taczanowski, 1886. Ornithologie du Pérou. R. Friedländer & Sohn. Berlin. Vol 3: 522 pp. + 1 map Tables: 218 pp. online BHL
- Robert Ridgway A Nomenclature of Colors for Naturalists
- Hans von Berlepsch Kritische Bemerkungen zur Colibri-Literatur, Separat. aus der Festschrift des Vereins für Naturkunde zu Cassel, vol. 1, 1886 [ Literature from 1537 sic.

Ongoing events

- Osbert Salvin and Frederick DuCane Godman 1879–1904. Biologia Centrali-Americana. Aves
- Richard Bowdler Sharpe Catalogue of the Birds in the British Museum London,1874-98.
- Anton Reichenow, Hans von Berlepsch, and other members of the German Ornithologists' Society in Journal für Ornithologie online BHL
- Ornis; internationale Zeitschrift für die gesammte Ornithologie.Vienna 1885-1905 online BHL
- The Auk online BHL
- The Ibis
