= 1883 in birding and ornithology =

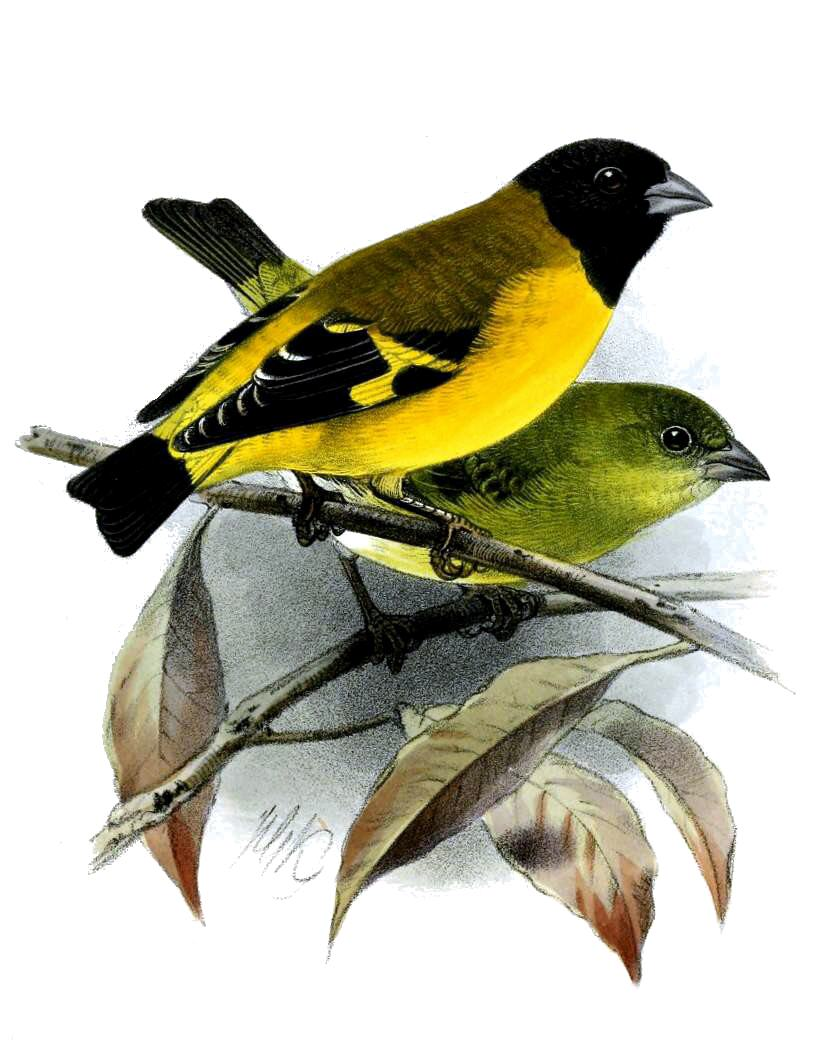
Chrysomitris siemiradzkii Proceedings of the Zoological Society of London 1883

Birds described in 1883 include South Island takahe, Goldie's bird-of-paradise, black-crowned waxbill, marsh seedeater, peruvian plantcutter, saffron siskin, Tanimbar boobook, black-bibbed monarch, cinnamon-tailed fantail, flutist wren, Kolombangara monarch, slaty-headed longbill, Green-and-white hummingbird, large-billed parrotlet, grey-bellied comet

== Events ==
- Foundation of the American Ornithological Society.

== Publications ==
- Henry Seebohm A History of British Birds London, R. H. Porter 1883-93
- Władysław Taczanowski, 1883. Description des espèces nouvelles de la collection péruvienne de M. le Dr. Raimondi de Lima. Proceedings of the Zoological Society of London Pt1 p. 70–72 pl.17. BHL Reference page.
- Hans von Berlepsch and Taczanowski, W., 1883. Liste des Oiseaux recuillis par MM. Stolzmann et Siemiradzki dans l'Ecuadeur occidental. Proceedings of the Zoological Society of London Pt.4: 536–577.
- Richard Böhm, 1883 Ornithologische Notizen aus Central-Africa. Journal für Ornithologie 31_1883: 162 - 208.

Ongoing events

- John Gould The birds of Asia 1850-83 7 vols. 530 plates, Artists: J. Gould, H. C. Richter, W. Hart and J. Wolf; Lithographers:H. C. Richter and W. Hart
- Osbert Salvin and Frederick DuCane Godman 1879–1904. Biologia Centrali-Americana . Aves
- Richard Bowdler Sharpe Catalogue of the Birds in the British Museum London,1874-98.
- Anton Reichenow. Gustav Hartlaub, Hans von Berlepsch, Jean Cabanis and other members of the German Ornithologists' Society in Journal für Ornithologie online BHL
- The Ibis
