= 1878 in birding and ornithology =

- Years in birding and ornithology: 1875 1876 1877 1878 1879 1880 1881
- Centuries: 18th century · 19th century · 20th century
- Decades: 1840s 1850s 1860s 1870s 1880s 1890s 1900s
- Years: 1875 1876 1877 1878 1879 1880 1881

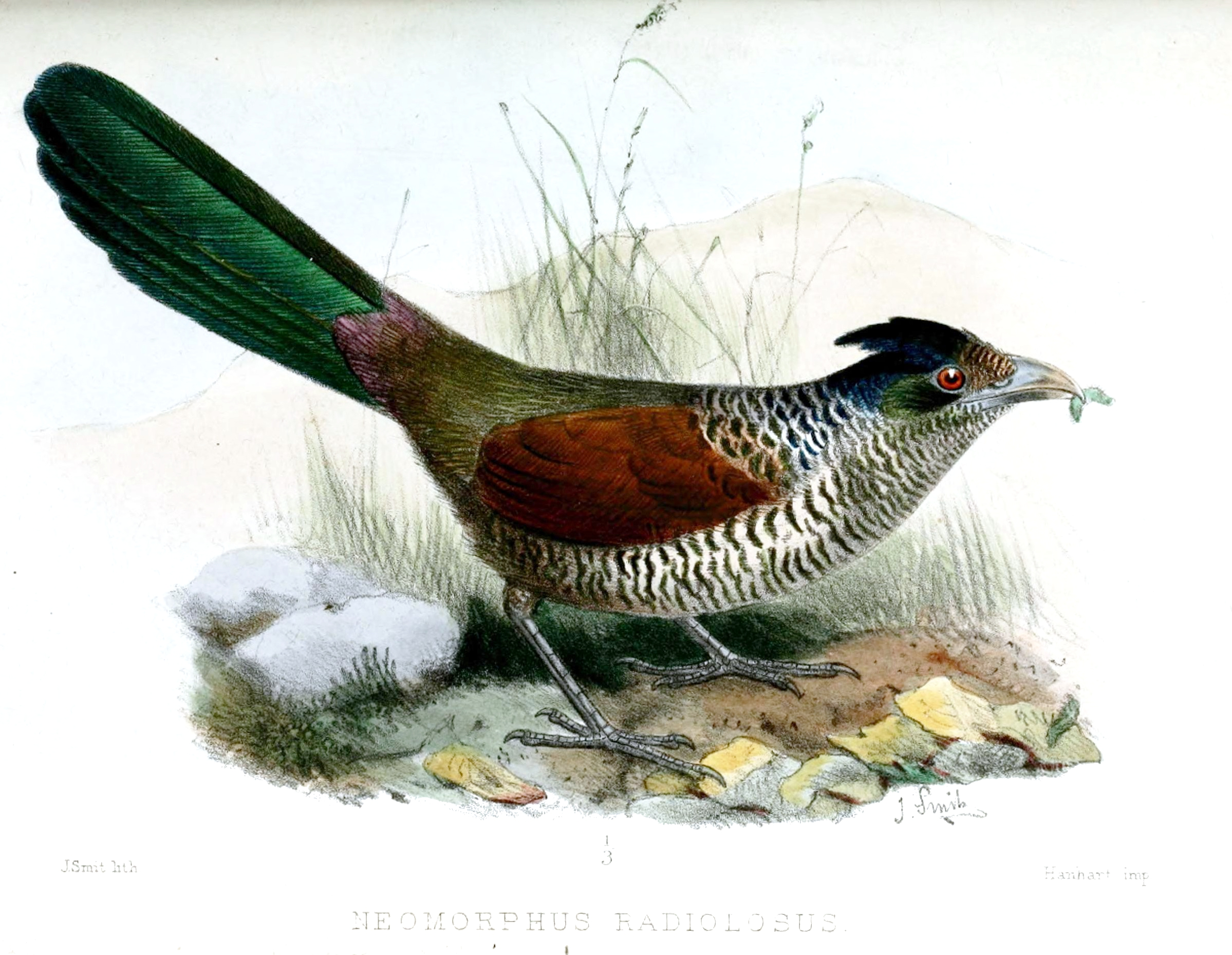
Banded ground cuckoo

- Birds described in 1878 include Everett's white-eye, Pacific screech owl, Legge's hawk-eagle, Ochre-breasted pipit, Grey wren-warbler, Whistling fruit dove, Ashy-headed babbler, Scaly-breasted honeyeater, Fischer's turaco,

== Events ==
- Death of George Dawson Rowley

== Publications ==
- William Vincent Legge A history of the birds of Ceylon Published by the author [1878-1880] BHL
- Daniel Giraud Elliot On the Fruit-Pigeons of the Genus Ptilopus Proceedings of the Zoological Society of London.1878 500–575 London :Academic Press
- Anton Reichenow and Gustav Mützel, Vogelbilder aus fernen Zonen [Pictures of Birds from Faraway Lands] Theodor Fischer, Kassel, Germany: 1878-83
- George Ernest Shelley A Monograph of the Cinnyridae, or Family of Sun Birds (1878)

Ongoing events

- John Gould The birds of Asia 1850-83 7 vols. 530 plates, Artists: J. Gould, H. C. Richter, W. Hart and J. Wolf; Lithographers:H. C. Richter and W. Hart
- Henry Eeles Dresser and Richard Bowdler Sharpe A History of the Birds of Europe, Including all the Species Inhabiting the Western Palearctic Region.Taylor & Francis of Fleet Street, London
- José Vicente Barbosa du Bocage Ornithologie d'Angola. 2 volumes, 1877–1881.
- The Ibis
