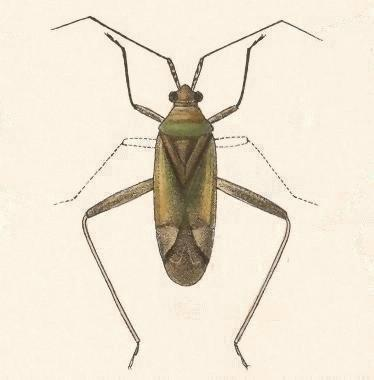
- Compsocerocoris elegans as illustrated in Biologia Centrali-Americana

Scientific classification
- Kingdom: Animalia
- Phylum: Arthropoda
- Class: Insecta
- Order: Hemiptera
- Suborder: Heteroptera
- Family: Miridae
- Genus: Compsocerocoris
- Species: C. elegans

Binomial name
- Compsocerocoris elegans Carvalho and Dolling, 1976

= Compsocerocoris elegans =

Species of true bug

Compsocerocoris elegans is a species of grass bugs (insects in the family Miridae).
