= Friedrich Tischler =

German lawyer and ornithologist

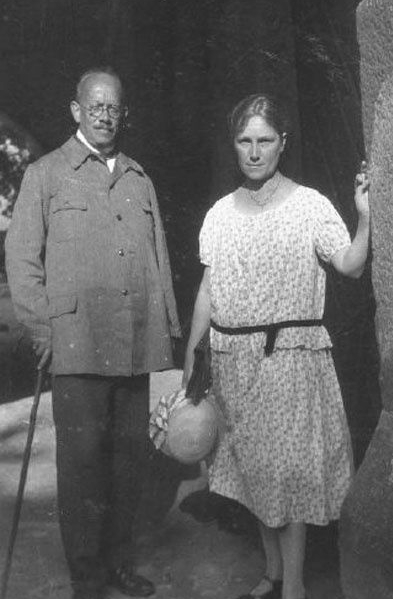
Friedrich and Rose Tischler c. 1937

Friedrich Tischler (2 June 1881 – 29 January 1945) was a German lawyer and ornithologist who studied the birds of East Prussia and published a two volume work on them. He was working on another major work which was destroyed during the Second World War. He committed suicide along with his wife when Soviet troops marched into Germany.

== Biography ==
Tischler was the brother of the botanist Georg Tischler (1878–1955) and the son of Oskar Tischler (1843–1891), a landowner in Losgehnen. Tischler studied law in Königsberg, Leipzig and Munich and worked as a magistrate in Heilsberg. He took an early interest in birds and biology thanks to his tutor Karl Borowski, and became a member of the Deutschen Ornithologen Gesellschaft (German Ornithologists Society) in 1908 and spent time in an ornithological station on the Curonian Spit, meeting Johannes Thienemann and spent time at the Zoological Institute of the Königsberg Albertina University. He built up an insect collection and a herbarium. He published Die Vögel der Provinz Ostpreußen (the birds of the East Prussian province) in 1914 and a two volume Die Vögel Ostpreußens und seiner Nachbargebiete (the birds of east Prussia and neighbourhood) in 1941. He was appointed as a Foreign Scientific member of the Kaiser Wilhelm Society for the Advancement of Science and was awarded an honorary doctorate by the Königsberg Albertina University.

Friedrich Tischler was married to Rose Kowalski (1884–1945). The manuscript of a third work was destroyed in the Bombing of Königsberg. While Soviet troops invaded the region in the winter of 1945, the couple committed suicide next to a grave that they had their servant Karl Hartwig dig for themselves, most likely on the January 29, 1945. The site was recognizable only as a grassy mound overgrown with trees and it was only in 1999 that a memorial was set up by Polish and German ornithologists.

Otto Kleinschmidt named a subspecies Parus borealis tischleri after Tischler in 1917 but it is today considered a synonym. Similarly he also described Accipiter tischleri in 1938 which is a synonym of Accipiter gentilis and Corvus coloeus tischleri in 1935 which is a synonym of Coloeus monedula soemmerringii.
