= Lusiny =

- Village
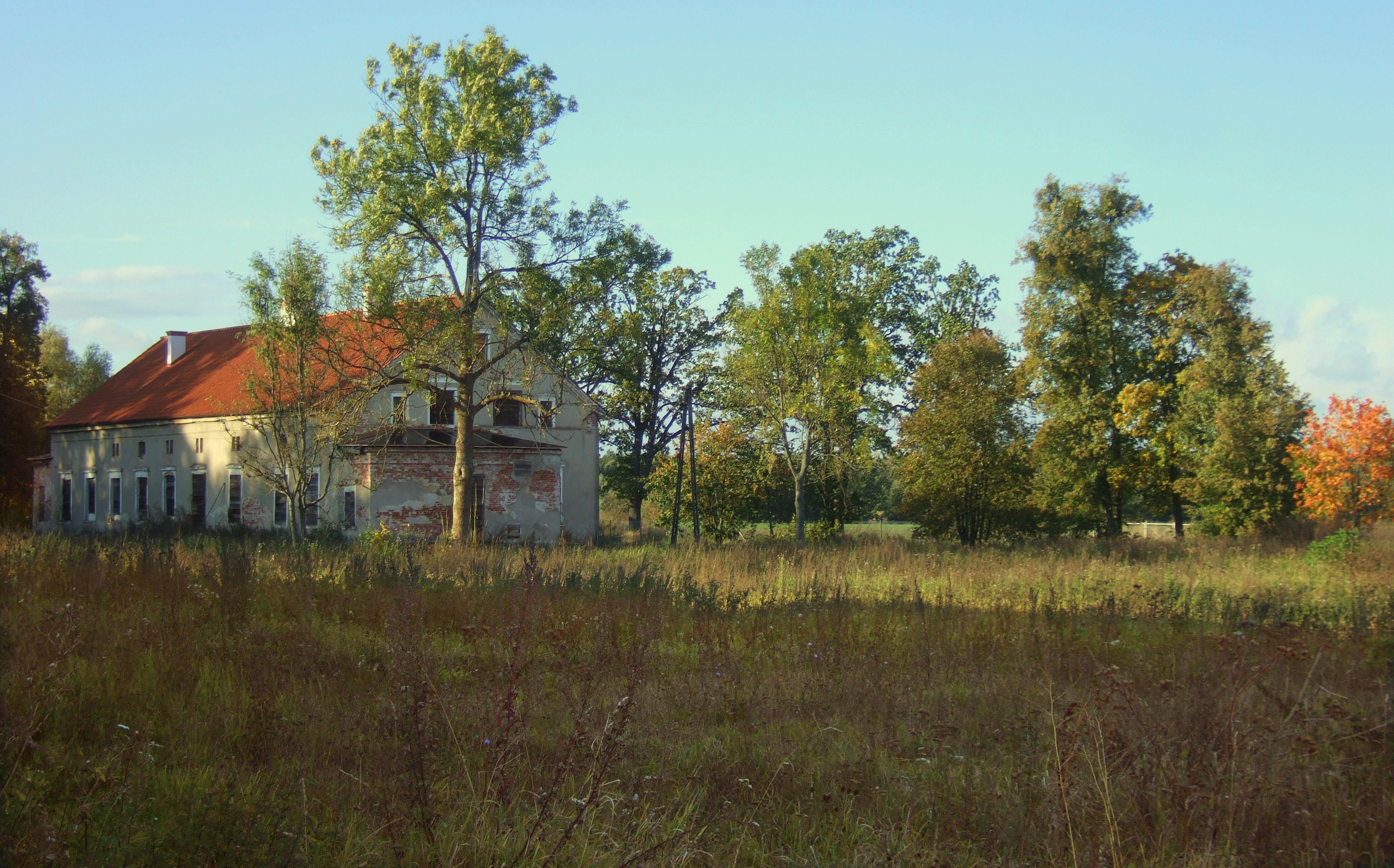
- Old manor house in Lusiny

- Location within Poland
- Coordinates: 54°13′N 20°53′E
- Country: Poland
- Voivodeship: Warmian-Masurian
- County: Bartoszyce
- Gmina: Bartoszyce
- Time zone: UTC+1 (CET)
  - Summer (DST): UTC+2 (CEST)
- Vehicle registration: NBA

Lusiny [luˈɕinɨ] (German: Losgehnen) is a village in the administrative district of Gmina Bartoszyce, within Bartoszyce County, Warmian-Masurian Voivodeship, in northern Poland, close to the border with the Kaliningrad Oblast of Russia.

== History ==
The village was a possession of various nobles, including the Ciesielski and Tischler families.

During World War II, in early 1945 the entire male population was executed by the Soviet Army.

== Notable residents ==
- Friedrich Tischler (1881–1945), ornithologist
