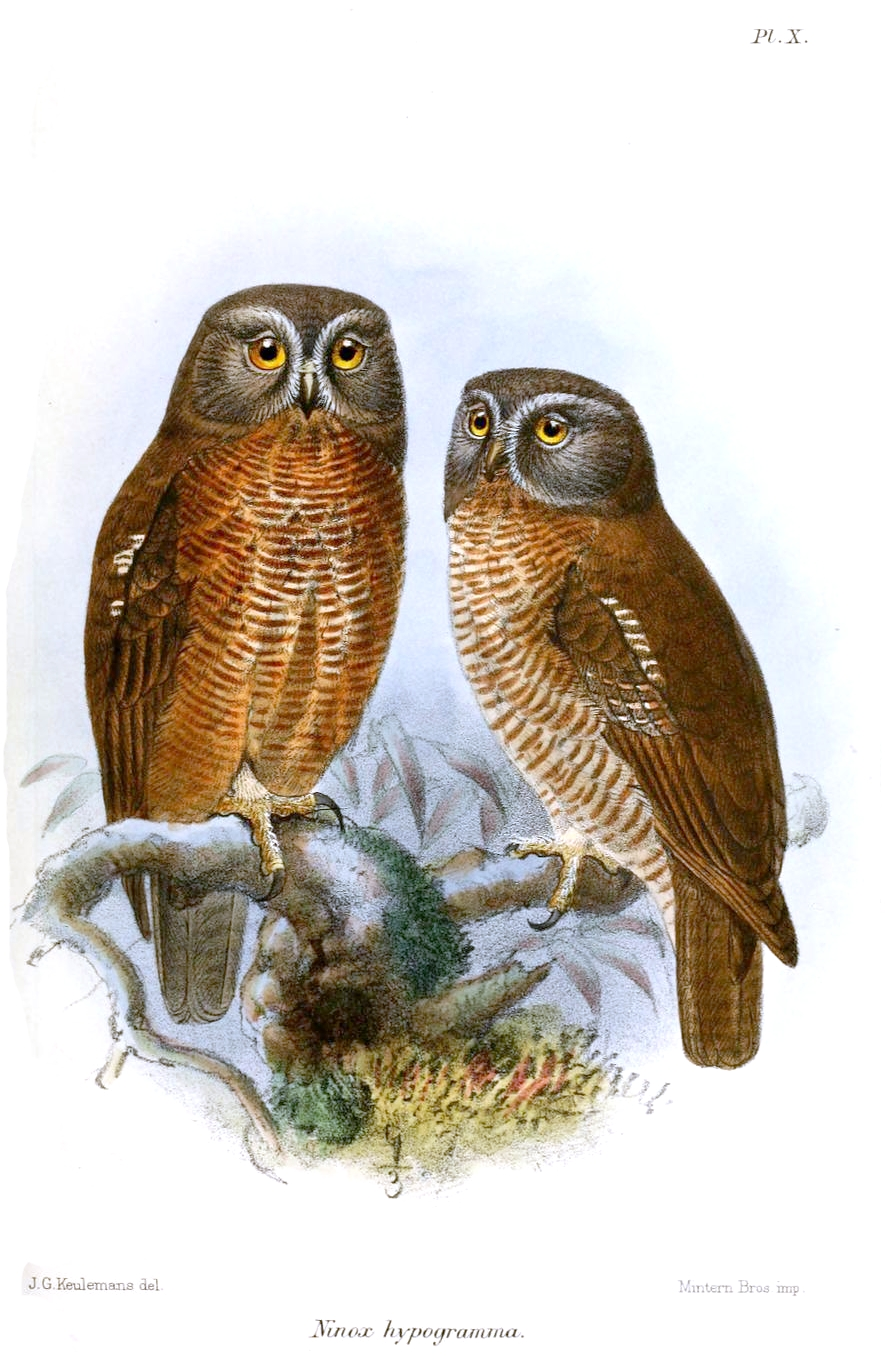
- Ninox hypogramma, Halmahera boobook

Scientific classification
- Kingdom: Animalia
- Phylum: Chordata
- Class: Aves
- Order: Strigiformes
- Family: Strigidae
- Genus: Ninox

Species complex including
- Ninox forbesi (PL Sclater, 1883); Ninox hypogramma (GR Gray, 1861); Ninox squamipila (Bonaparte, 1850); Ninox hantu (Wallace, 1863)

= Moluccan boobook =

Moluccan boobook Species complex of Ninox owls

Group of owls

The Moluccan boobook or Moluccan hawk-owl group (Ninox spp.), are a group of owls in the family Strigidae. They are found in Indonesia. Once considered a single species, the four species are now considered part of a species complex. Natural habitat for all species is subtropical or tropical moist lowland forests.

== Taxonomy ==
=== Species ===
Most taxonomists recognize four species:

- Ninox forbesi (PL Sclater, 1883) - Tanimbar boobook - Tanimbar Islands
- Ninox hypogramma (GR Gray, 1861) - Halmahera boobook - northern Maluku Islands of Halmahera, Ternate, and Bacan
- Ninox squamipila (Bonaparte, 1850) - Seram boobook- Seram Island in the southern Maluku Islands
- Ninox hantu (Wallace, 1863) - Buru boobook - Buru Island in the southern Maluku Islands
