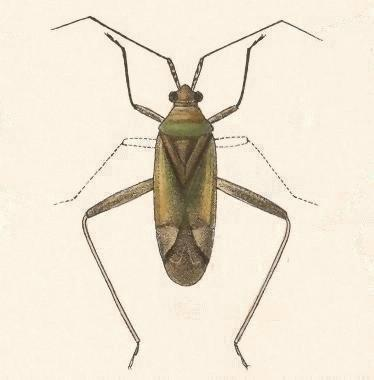
- Biologia Centrali-Americana - Compsocerocoris elegans

Scientific classification
- Domain: Eukaryota
- Kingdom: Animalia
- Phylum: Arthropoda
- Class: Insecta
- Order: Hemiptera
- Suborder: Heteroptera
- Family: Miridae
- Genus: Compsocerocoris; Reuter, 1876

= Compsocerocoris =

Genus of true bugs

Compsocerocoris is a genus of grass bugs (insects in the family Miridae).
