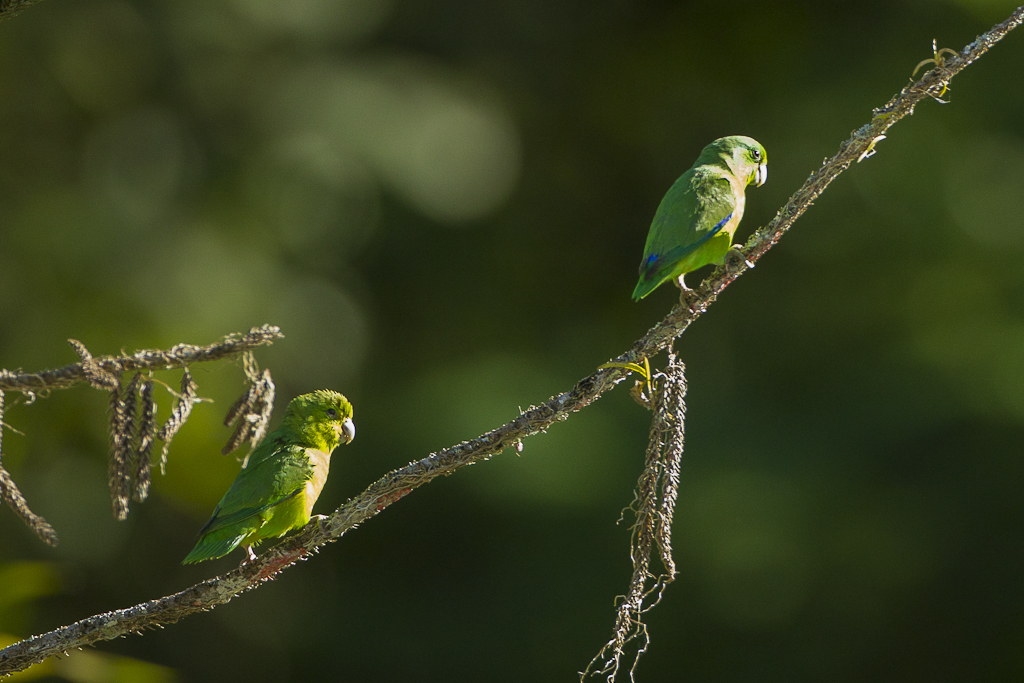

Scientific classification
- Kingdom: Animalia
- Phylum: Chordata
- Class: Aves
- Order: Psittaciformes
- Family: Psittacidae
- Genus: Forpus
- Species: F. crassirostris

Binomial name
- Forpus crassirostris (Taczanowski, 1883)

Synonyms
- Forpus xanthopterygius crassirostris

= Riparian parrotlet =

Large-billed parrotlet

Species of bird

The riparian parrotlet (Forpus crassirostris) or large-billed parrotlet is a species of parrot in the family Psittacidae.

== Description ==
Riparian parrotlets are typically 12–13 centimetres (4.7–5.1 in) long and weigh about 28 grams (0.99 oz). Their bodies are mostly yellow-green. Eyes are dark brown and beaks and feet are light peach. Riparian parrotlets are sexually dimorphic: males have blue rumps and lower backs, with blue feathers along the leading edges of their wings and blue secondaries; primary coverts are blue-gray. Females have no blue feathers and a yellow-green belly.

== Distribution ==
Riparian parrotlets are found in southeastern Colombia to northern Peru and western Brazil. There is a small population on São Sebastião Island. Though they do not fully migrate, it has been suggested that riparian parrotlets are altitudinal migrants: abundance of the species in lowland areas increased during winter and spring; this is likely because during these seasons, the main plants of the large-billed parrotlets' diet were budding and providing more food.

Riparian parrotlets tend to inhabit forest edges, riparian woodlands, and degraded or deforested areas.

== Conservation ==
This species is currently unrecognized by the IUCN Red List, so it does not have an official conservation status. Its populations are included in estimates of cobalt-rumped parrotlets, which are listed as Least Concern with a stable population. It is suggested that the population of riparian parrotlets is relatively low.

== Behavior and ecology ==
=== Social ===
Like all members of the genus Forpus, riparian parrotlets are highly gregarious and are often seen in flocks of up to 100 birds.

=== Reproduction ===
Riparian parrotlets nest in tree cavities or similar places. They have been known to use the abandoned nests of rufous horneros and other unrelated species.

Females lay 3-7 small white eggs, which are incubated for approximately 18 days before hatching.

=== Diet ===
Riparian parrotlets feed on seeds, fruits, flowers, buds, and other plants. They favor palm, Cecropia sp., Handroanthus serratifolius flowers and nectar, and Ceiba speciosa fruits.

== Taxonomy ==
According to most studies, the riparian parrotlet is considered a subspecies of the cobalt-rumped parrotlet as Forpus xanthopterygius crassirostris. However, there are some studies that argue that its morphological differences support the existence of the large-billed parrotlet as its own species, F. crassirostris. There is continuing debate over the validity of this claim. Most taxonomic authorities (including the American Ornithological Society) do not recognize this change in classification.
