= 1876 in birding and ornithology =

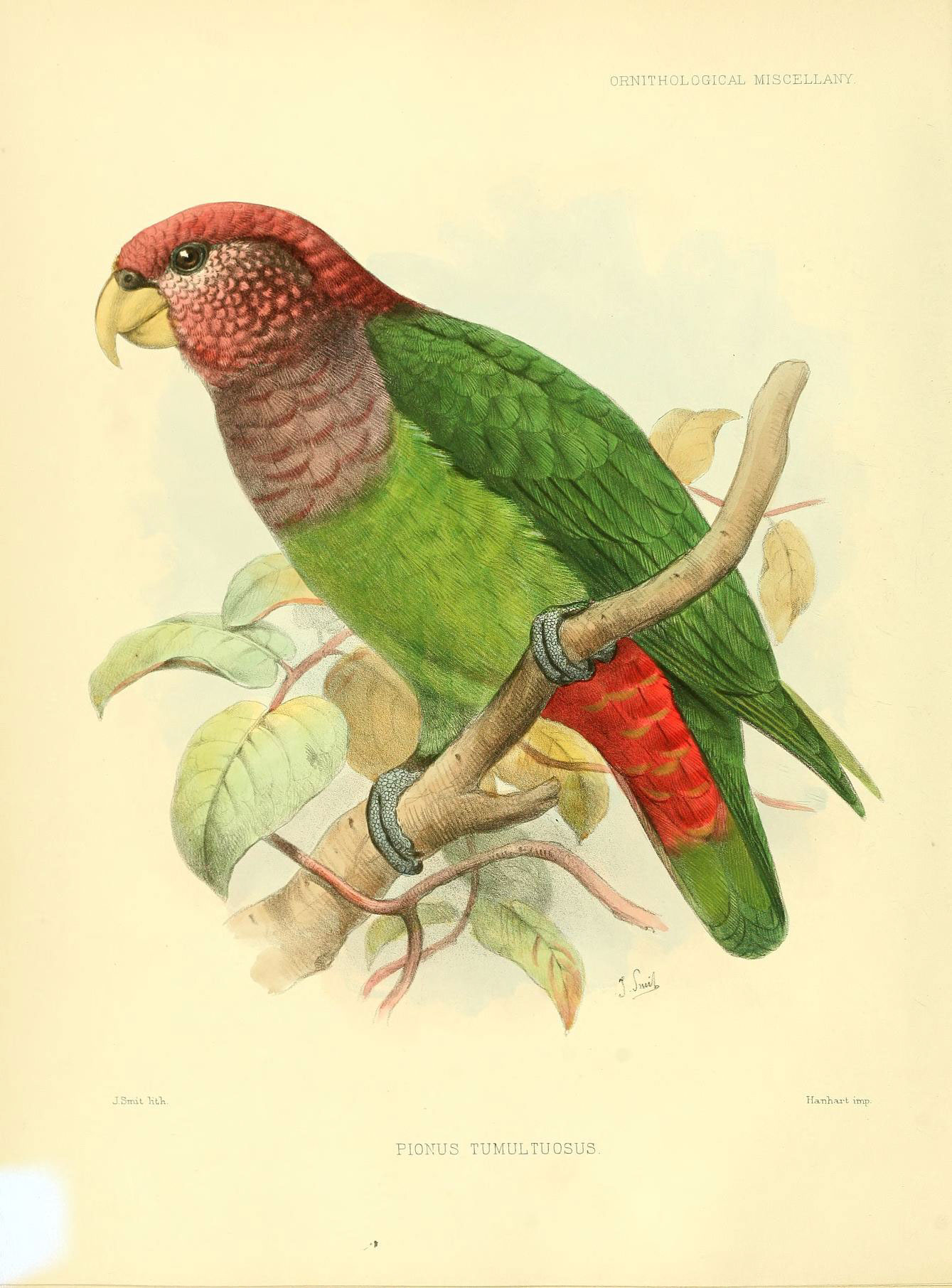
Speckle-faced parrot in Ornithological Miscellany

Birds described in 1876 include the tooth-billed bowerbird, Heuglin's gull, Chinese white-browed rosefinch, Sclater's crowned pigeon, Pohnpei flycatcher, mountain myzomela, streak-headed honeyeater and Maxwell's black weaver.

== Events ==
- Death of Theodor von Heuglin

== Publications ==
- Henry George Vennor, Our Birds of Prey: Or, the Eagles, Hawks and Owls of Canada (1876)
- George Dawson Rowley Ornithological Miscellany Trübner and Co., Bernard Quaritch, R.H. Porter,1876-1878.
- Nikolay Przhevalsky Mongoliya i Strana Tangutov. Tryokhletneye puteshestviye v Vostochnoj Nagoruoj Asii (= Mongolia and the Tangut Country. A Three-Year Travel in Eastern High Asia). Volumes 1–2. Imper. Russ. Geogr. Soc., St. Petersburg (in Russian; English edition, London 1876, French edition, Paris 1880, German edition, Jena 1887; abridged Russian edition with added notes, Moscow 1946).
- August Carl Eduard Baldamus Vogel-Märchen. Dresden, Schöufelb, 1876.
- Tommaso Salvadori, 1876. Descrizione di cinquantotto nuove specie di uccelli, ed osservazioni intorno ad altre poco note, della Nuova Guinea e di altre Isole Papuane, raccolte del Dr. Odoardo Beccari e dai cacciatore del. Sig. A.A. Bruijn. Annali del Museo civico di storia naturale di Genova 7 (56/61): 896–976.
- Jean Cabanis and other members of the German Ornithologists' Society in Ornithologisches Centralblatt Leipzig :L.A. Kittler,1876-82. online

== Ongoing events ==
- John Gould The Birds of Asia 1850-83 7 vols. 530 plates, Artists: J. Gould, H. C. Richter, W. Hart and J. Wolf; Lithographers: H. C. Richter and W. Hart
- Henry Eeles Dresser and Richard Bowdler Sharpe A History of the Birds of Europe, Including all the Species Inhabiting the Western Palearctic Region. Taylor & Francis of Fleet Street, London
- Etienne Mulsant, Histoire Naturelle des Oiseaux-Mouches, ou Colibris constituant la famille des Trochilides (published 1874-77)
- Paolo Savi Ornitologia Italiana Firenze :Successori Le Monnier,1873-1876. (opera posthuma 1873–1876)
- The Ibis
