= Eugen von Boeck =

German naturalist and ornithologist (1823–1886)

- Born: Eugen von Boeck c. 1823; Kempten, Kingdom of Bavaria
- Died: February 1886; Cochabamba, Bolivia
- Citizenship: Bavarian, Bolivian
- Education: University of Dillingen
- Known for: Ornithology, publications on birds, and the founding of several schools in South America
- Spouse(s): Adelheit von Boeck, née von Kapff
- Children: Adolfo, Clara, Emma, Eugen
- Scientific career
- Fields: Zoology, Philosophy, Philology

Eugen von Boeck (July 13, 1823 – January 31, 1886) was a German educator and scientist who lived in Chile, Peru and Bolivia sending and publishing the results of his research in Europe during the second half of the 19th century.

== Birth and education ==
He was born in Kempten im Allgäu, Germany to the heart of a catholic and noble family of the Kingdom of Bavaria, in 1823. His parents were Alois von Boeck and Honoria von Bannwarth. Orphan of both parents by the age of 8, his care was entrusted to his paternal uncle, the Priest Francis Salesius von Boeck, who saw about that he, his three brothers and sister received proper education. After his studies in Institutes run by the Order of St. Benedict in Augsburg and the Jesuit University of Dillingen, in Dillingen an der Donau, having specialized his scientific formation in the fields of Philosophy, Zoology, and Philology, he was called to be a professor in Munich at the age of 23. He converted to Protestantism.

== Migration to South America ==
In 1852, following the impulse to take his knowledge to other regions, he traveled to Valdivia, Chile in response to a request for educationists that was published in his native country. The Hamburger vessel “Hermann” transported him to the New World along with his fellow countrymen who took their technical formation to their new home; among farmers, bakers, carpenters and mechanics, he was the only “erudite” among the passengers. On board the ship he met and married Adelheid Kapff, his companion until death. She was the daughter of a Cavalry Master in the Kingdom of Württemberg and was traveling with a one-year-old son named Adolf. In the mentioned city, he was a professor and director of the “Liceo de Valdivia” (high school) until the year 1861. His children Emma, Albert, Clara and Eugen were all born there. He never restricted his work as an investigator and it was in Valdivia that he wrote his first treatise on ornithology, passion he shared with the German scientist and friend of his, Dr. Rudolf Phillipi. Later, he moved to Arequipa, Peru with a contract for the "Harmsen" Commercial House and once concluded, took his family to live in the city of Tacna, where he took part in the foundation of the “German School”. Due to the renown the school achieved and the fame of the illustrious educator that surpassed the frontiers of Peru, he received the petition of being the founding Director of the first private school in the city of Cochabamba, Bolivia in 1868: the “2 de Mayo” elementary school. Besides his work in this entity, he gave private lessons of languages and science. Further on, the authorities of Cochabamba realized that they were not making the most of the talent he had for teaching. Soon he was invited to be Counselor of Instruction, the first Director of the “Bolivar” elementary school, teacher and finally Director of the “Sucre” elementary school, position he held until his death.

== Publications ==
He would not restrict his work to education but permanently performed study and research. During his stay in Cochabamba, he published countless articles in the local press, being in charge of the meteorological column of the “El Heraldo" newspaper. He traveled around the country mainly observing the ornithological fauna. He carried out important deliveries of the results of his observations to scientific societies in Europe, which in turn published them, giving them the deserved value for the time and effort employed in their preparation. About this he commented: “the stay here is costly because it is difficult to receive communications, there are few libraries and everything is very modest.” However, this did not stop him from making a valuable contribution to both culture and science. Among others works, he published Seven Liberal Arts in the Middle Ages, Trip to the Araucania, Treatise on Physical Geography, Quechua and Ornithology of the Valley of Cochabamba, Bolivia and its Surroundings, being the latter the first meaningful scientific work in the branch of ornithology written on this region.

== Final years ==
His wife died in 1885, marking a crucial moment in his life. Referring to this event, he wrote a friend: “it is a deep pain that I have not overcome, many times I find myself lonely and I must render all my energy to overcome this lethargic situation.” Death met him in the year of 1886, in full exercise of his duties. The institutions in which he served, the university and municipal authorities, the noteworthy citizens, the German colony and the “five or six thousand children” he educated, rendered him a worthy posthumous homage before his grave. As “El Heraldo” indicated in the chronicle published on occasion of his funeral: “Few deaths have been felt as much as this”.

== See also ==
- German colonization of Valdivia, Osorno and Llanquihue
