= Bradford Torrey =

American ornithologist (1843–1912)

Bradford Torrey (October 9, 1843 – October 7, 1912) was an American ornithologist.

== Biography ==
Bradford Torrey was born in Weymouth, Massachusetts on October 9, 1843. He was educated in the public schools of Weymouth, taught for two years, and subsequently engaged in business in Boston. In 1886, he became an assistant editor of the Youth's Companion. He was also a frequent contributor to periodicals.

Torrey devoted much time to the study of birds, their habits, peculiarities, and domestic traits. He died in Santa Barbara, California on October 7, 1912.

== Published ornithological works ==
- Birds in the Bush (1885)
- A Rambler's lease (1892)
- The Foot-Path Way (1893)
- A Florida Sketch-Book (1895)
- Spring Notes from Tennessee (1896)
- A World of Green Hills (1898)
- Every-Day Birds (1901)
- The Clerk of the Woods (1904)
- Field-days in California (1913)
