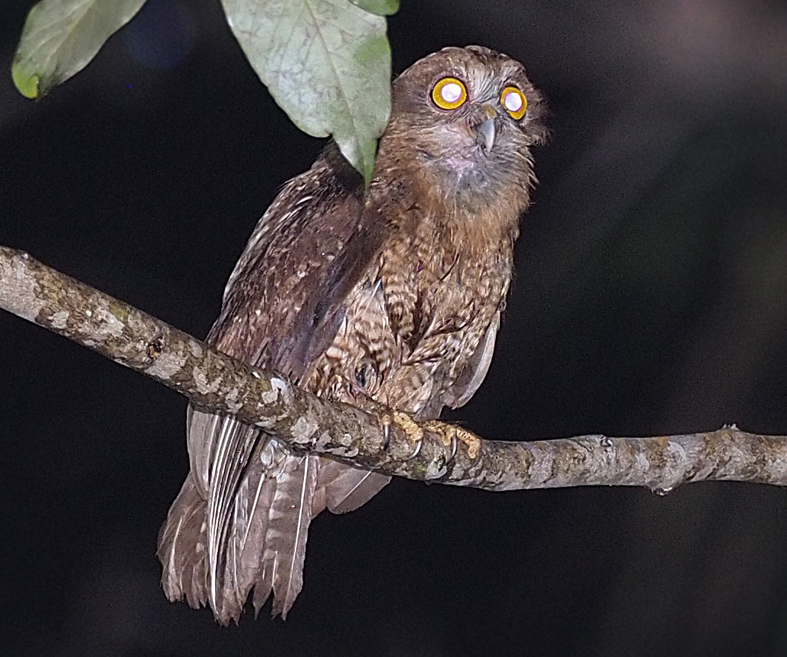

Conservation status
- Least Concern (IUCN 3.1)
- CITES Appendix II

Scientific classification
- Kingdom: Animalia
- Phylum: Chordata
- Class: Aves
- Order: Strigiformes
- Family: Strigidae
- Genus: Ninox
- Species: N. hantu

Binomial name
- Ninox hantu (Wallace, 1863)

= Buru boobook =

Species of owl

The Buru boobook (Ninox hantu) is a species of owl in the family Strigidae. It is found in Indonesia. Its natural habitat is subtropical or tropical moist lowland forests. It is threatened by habitat loss. It used to be considered a subspecies of the Moluccan boobook.

The Buru boobook is dark on the top with a bright rufous beneath it. Its forehead, cheeks, and chin are slight white, the tarsi and toes are filled with bristles, the bill is a horn-colored white, the irises are yellow, and their feet are white.
