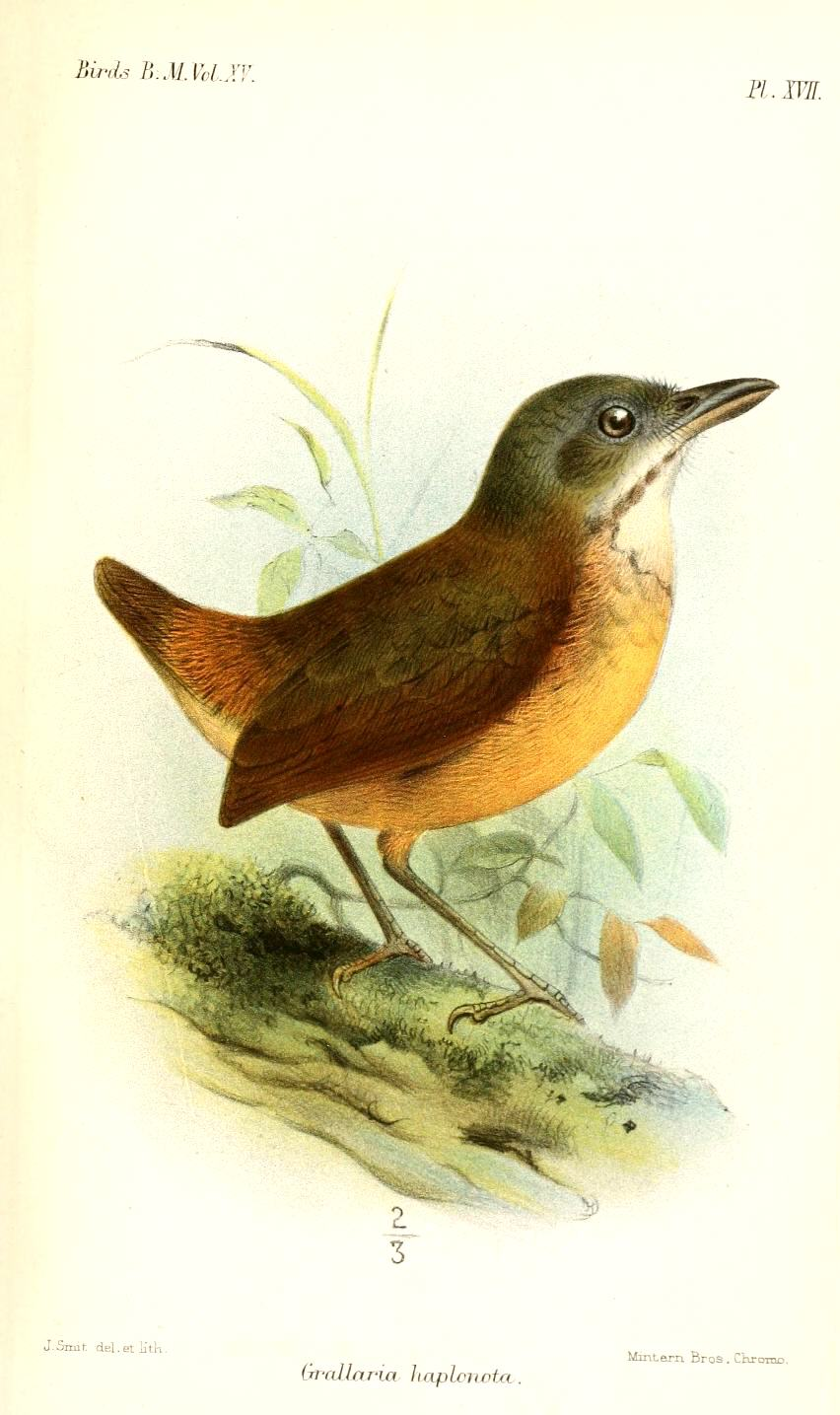
- Illustration by Joseph Smit, 1890

Conservation status
- Least Concern (IUCN 3.1)

Scientific classification
- Kingdom: Animalia
- Phylum: Chordata
- Class: Aves
- Order: Passeriformes
- Family: Grallariidae
- Genus: Grallaria
- Species: G. haplonota

Binomial name
- Grallaria haplonota Sclater, PL, 1877

= Plain-backed antpitta =

Species of bird

The plain-backed antpitta (Grallaria haplonota) is a species of bird in the family Grallariidae. It is found in Colombia, Ecuador, Peru, and Venezuela.

== Taxonomy and systematics ==
The plain-backed antpitta has these four subspecies:

- G. h. haplonota Sclater, PL, 1877
- G. h. pariae Phelps, WH & Phelps, WH Jr, 1949
- G. h. parambae Rothschild, 1900
- G. h. chaplinae Robbins, MB, & Ridgely, 1986

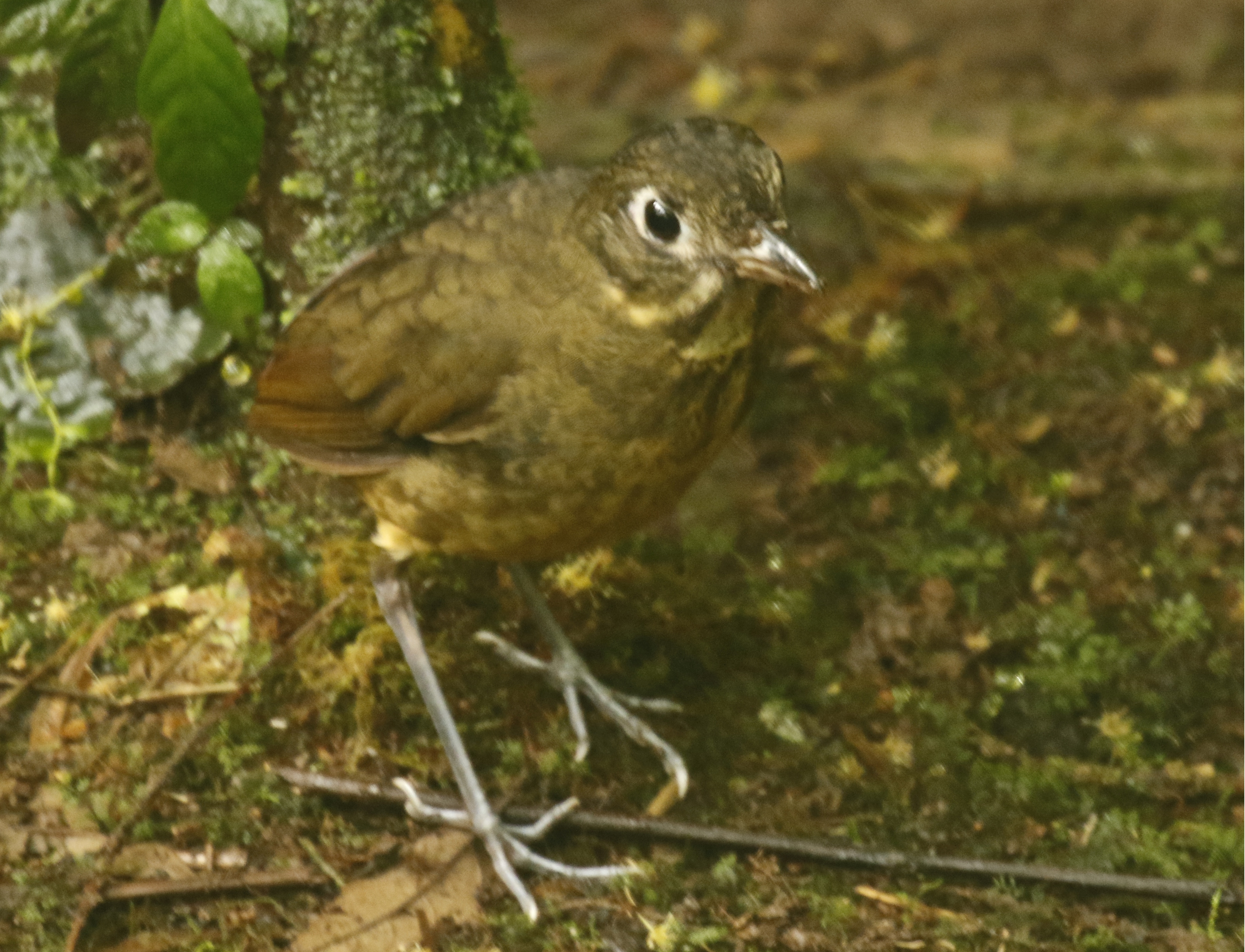
Wildsumaco Lodge - Ecuador

== Description ==
Grallaria antpittas are a "wonderful group of plump and round antbirds whose feathers are often fluffed up...they have stout bills [and] very short tails". The plain-backed antpitta is 16 to 17 cm (6.3 to 6.7 in) long and weighs 75 to 90 g (2.6 to 3.2 oz). The sexes have the same plumage. Adults of the nominate subspecies G. h. haplonota have a pale buff "moustache" with a dusky stripe below it on an otherwise brown face. Their upperparts are brown with a gray tinge on their crown; their tail is dark rufescent. Their chin and throat are white and the rest of their underparts ochraceous that is darkest on their breast.

Subspecies G. h. pariae has darker underparts and more reddish belly and undertail coverts than the nominate. G. h. parambae has darker but more tawny underparts than the nominate. G. h. chaplinae has more greenish olive upperparts and less white on the throat than the nominate. All subspecies have a dark brown iris, a black maxilla, a brownish horn mandible, and gray legs and feet.

== Distribution and habitat ==
The plain-backed antpitta has a highly disjunct distribution; no subspecies' range touches any of the others. The subspecies are found thus:

- G. h. haplonota: northern Venezuela; the Andes in Lara and Yaracuy states and in the Coastal Range from Carabobo to Miranda
- G. h. pariae: northeastern Venezuela's Paria Peninsula
- G. h. parambae: western slope of the Andes from Chocó and Risaralda departments in Colombia south through western Ecuador to El Oro Province
- G. h. chaplinae: eastern slope of the Andes from Colombia's Cauca Department south through eastern Ecuador into northern Peru's Amazonas and Loreto departments and separately in San Martín and Ucayali departments

The plain-backed antpitta inhabits the floor and understory in the interior and edges of humid to wet montane forest. It favors areas along creeks, on steep slopes, and regrowing openings such as those caused by treefall. In elevation it occurs between 700 and 1,600 m (2,300 and 5,200 ft) in Colombia, 700 and 1,300 m (2,300 and 4,300 ft) in western Ecuador, 1,100 and 1,700 m (3,600 and 5,600 ft) in eastern Ecuador, 1,150 and 1,500 m (3,800 and 4,900 ft) in Peru, and 900 and 1,950 m (3,000 and 6,400 ft) in Venezuela.

== Behavior ==
=== Movement ===
The plain-backed antpitta is believed to be resident throughout its range.

=== Feeding ===
The plain-backed antpitta feeds on small invertebrates like insects, spiders, worms, and snails. It is highly terrestrial while foraging; it walks and hops on the forest floor, pauses, and often stabs into soft soil for earthworms.

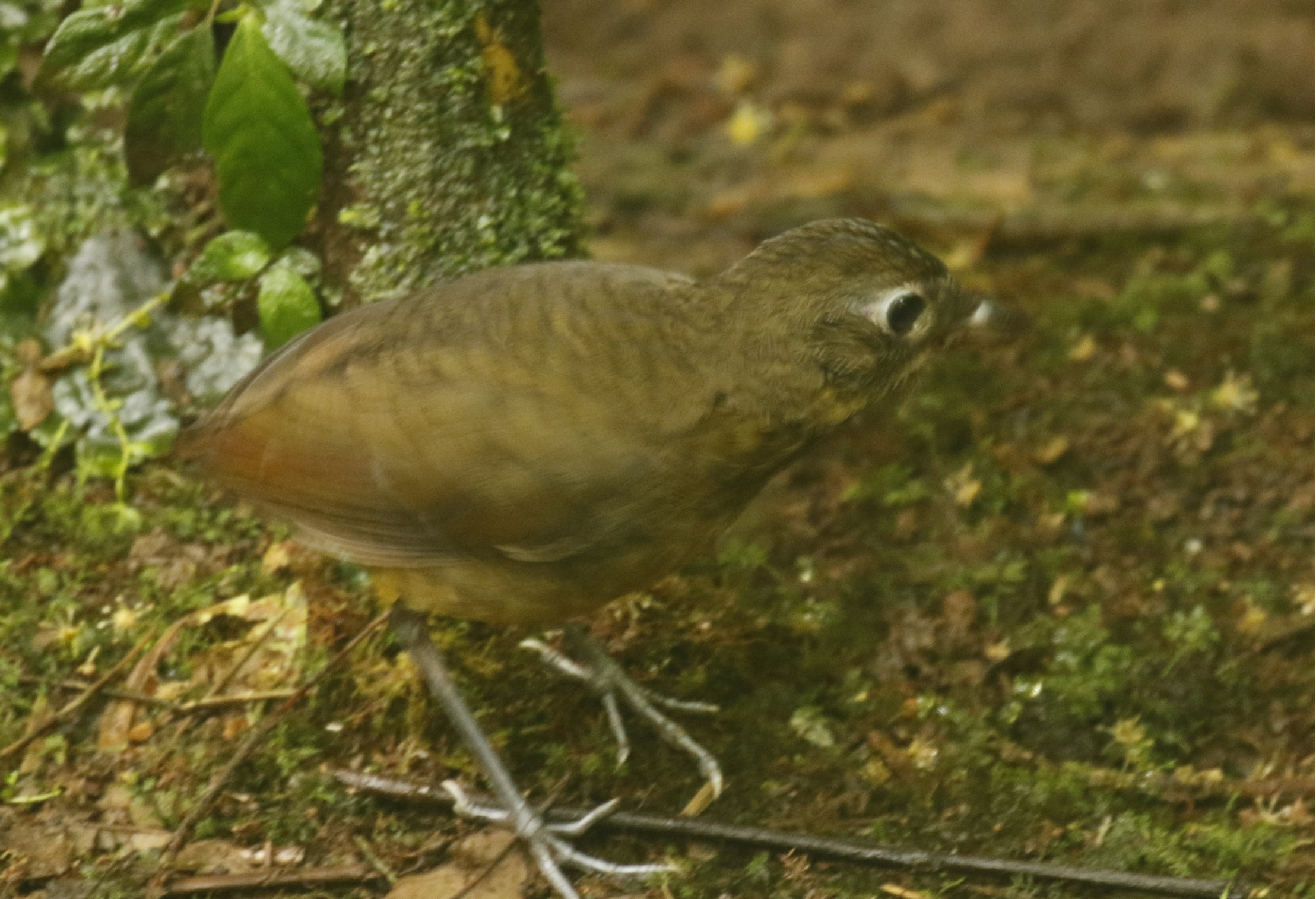
Wildsumaco Lodge - Ecuador

=== Breeding ===
The plain-backed antpitta breeds between April and August in coastal Venezuela; its breeding season elsewhere is not known. The only known nest was a hemisphere with a side entrance, made of sticks, and placed on the ground. It contained two eggs. Nothing else is known about the species' breeding biology.

=== Vocalization ===
The plain-backed antpitta sings from the ground or a low perch. Its song has been described as "a slow, measured [series] of ca. 5-9 low, hollow notes rising slightly in middle" and as "a fairly slow, slightly decelerating, rising-falling, loudest at the highest pitch, series of hooted notes".

== Status ==
The IUCN has assessed the plain-backed antpitta as being of Least Concern. Its population size is not known and is believed to be stable. No immediate threats have been identified. It is considered "rather local" in Colombia, local in Ecuador, "apparently rare and local" in Peru, and "locally common" in Venezuela. It is known in several protected areas and probably occurs in others.
