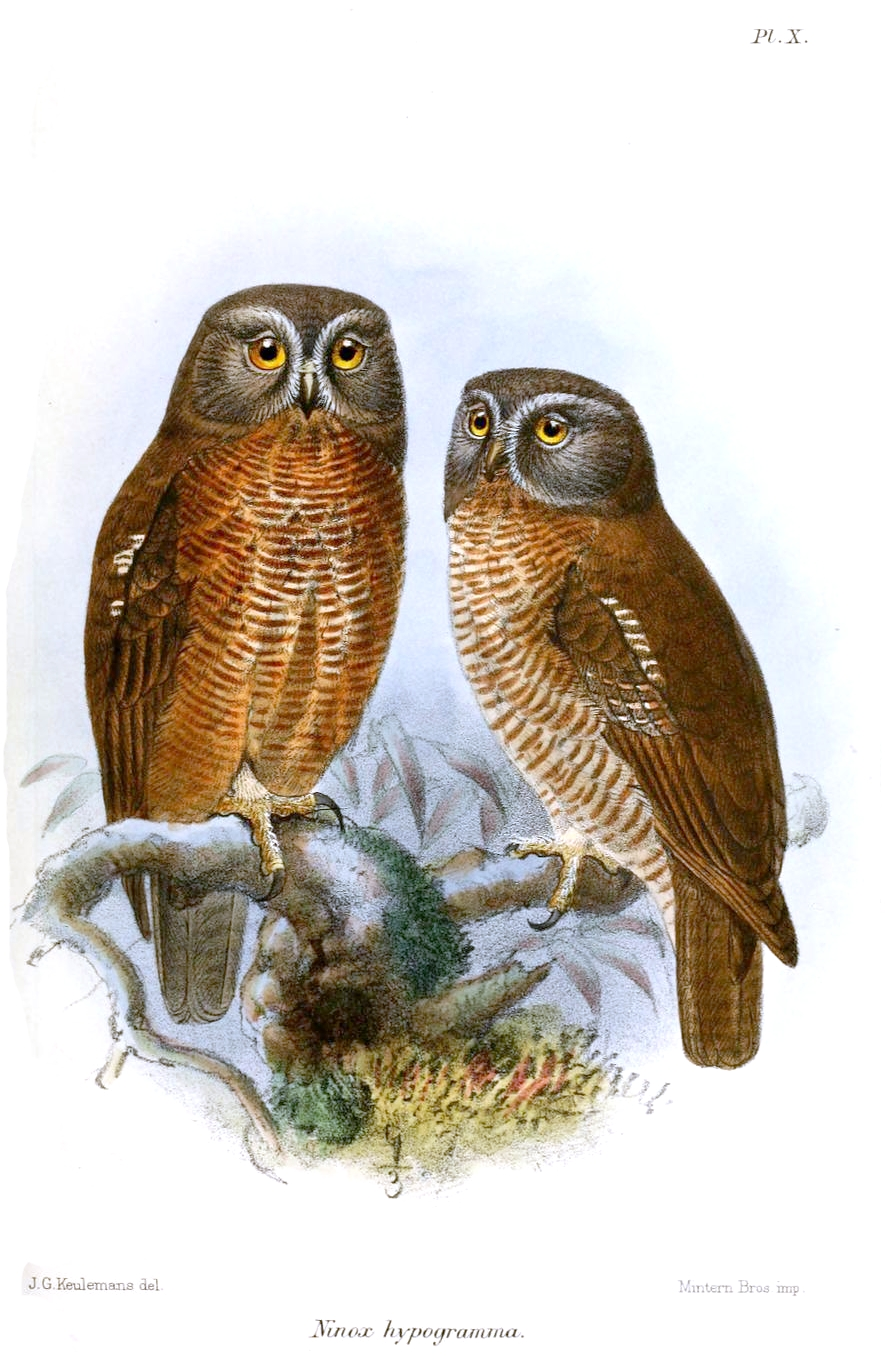

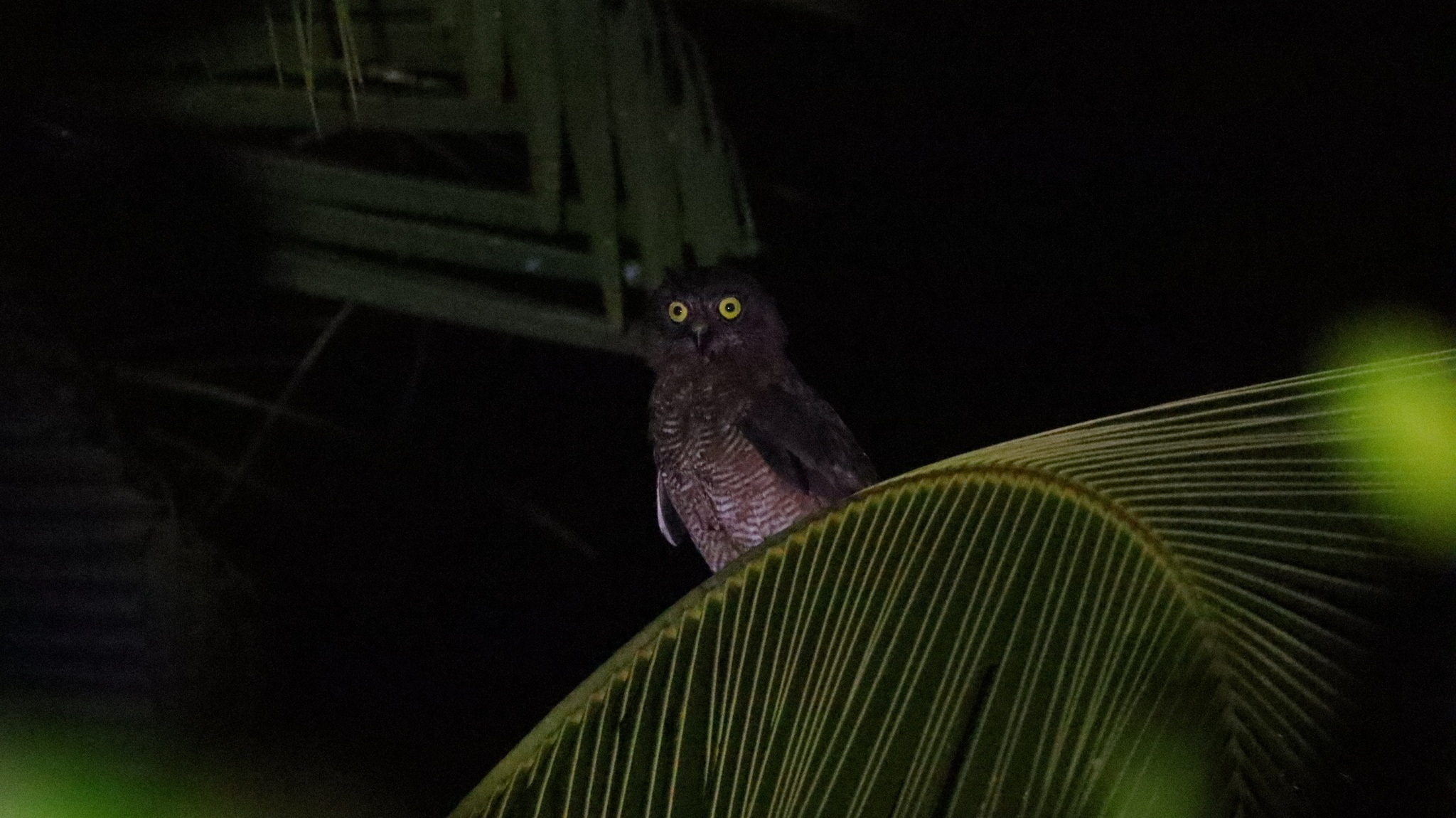

Conservation status
- Least Concern (IUCN 3.1)
- CITES Appendix II

Scientific classification
- Kingdom: Animalia
- Phylum: Chordata
- Class: Aves
- Order: Strigiformes
- Family: Strigidae
- Genus: Ninox
- Species: N. hypogramma

Binomial name
- Ninox hypogramma (GR Gray, 1861)

= Halmahera boobook =

Species of owl

The Halmahera boobook (Ninox hypogramma) is a species of owl in the family Strigidae. It inhabits the Indonesian islands of Halmahera, Ternate and Bacan. Its natural habitat is subtropical or tropical moist lowland forests. It is threatened by habitat loss. It was previously considered to be a subspecies of the Moluccan boobook.
