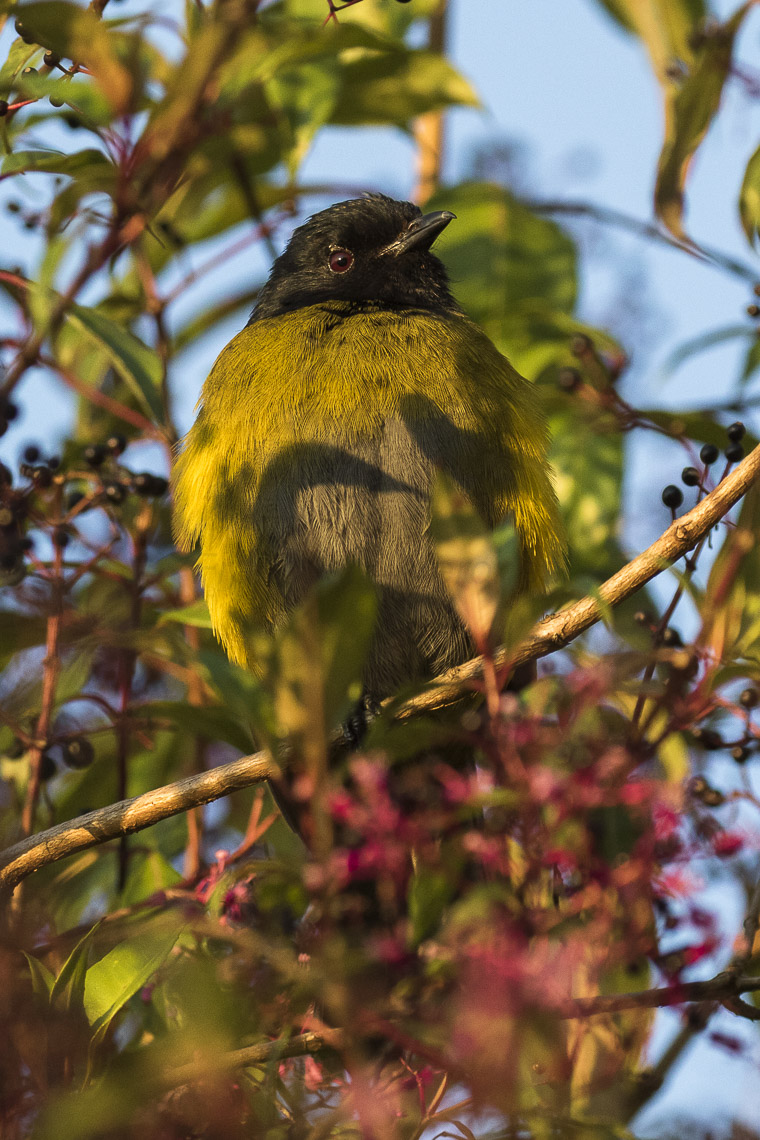

Conservation status
- Least Concern (IUCN 3.1)

Scientific classification
- Kingdom: Animalia
- Phylum: Chordata
- Class: Aves
- Order: Passeriformes
- Family: Ptiliogonatidae
- Genus: Phainoptila; Salvin, 1877
- Species: P. melanoxantha

Binomial name
- Phainoptila melanoxantha Salvin, 1877

= Black-and-yellow phainoptila =

Species of bird

The black-and-yellow phainoptila or black-and-yellow silky-flycatcher (Phainoptila melanoxantha) is a species of bird in the family Ptiliogonatidae, the silky-flycatchers. It is found in Costa Rica and Panama.

== Taxonomy and systematics ==
The black-and-yellow phainoptila is the only member of its genus, but its further taxonomy is unresolved. The IOC, the Clements taxonomy, AviList, and the American Ornithological Society assign it two subspecies, the nominate P. m. melanoxantha (Salvin, 1877) and P. m. parkeri (Barrantes & Sánchez, JE, 2000). However, as of late 2025 BirdLife International's Handbook of the Birds of the World includes a third, P. m. minor. The IOC and AviList call the species black-and-yellow phainoptila and the others call it the black-and-yellow silky-flycatcher. The generic name Phainoptila is derived from the Greek and means "shining plumage".

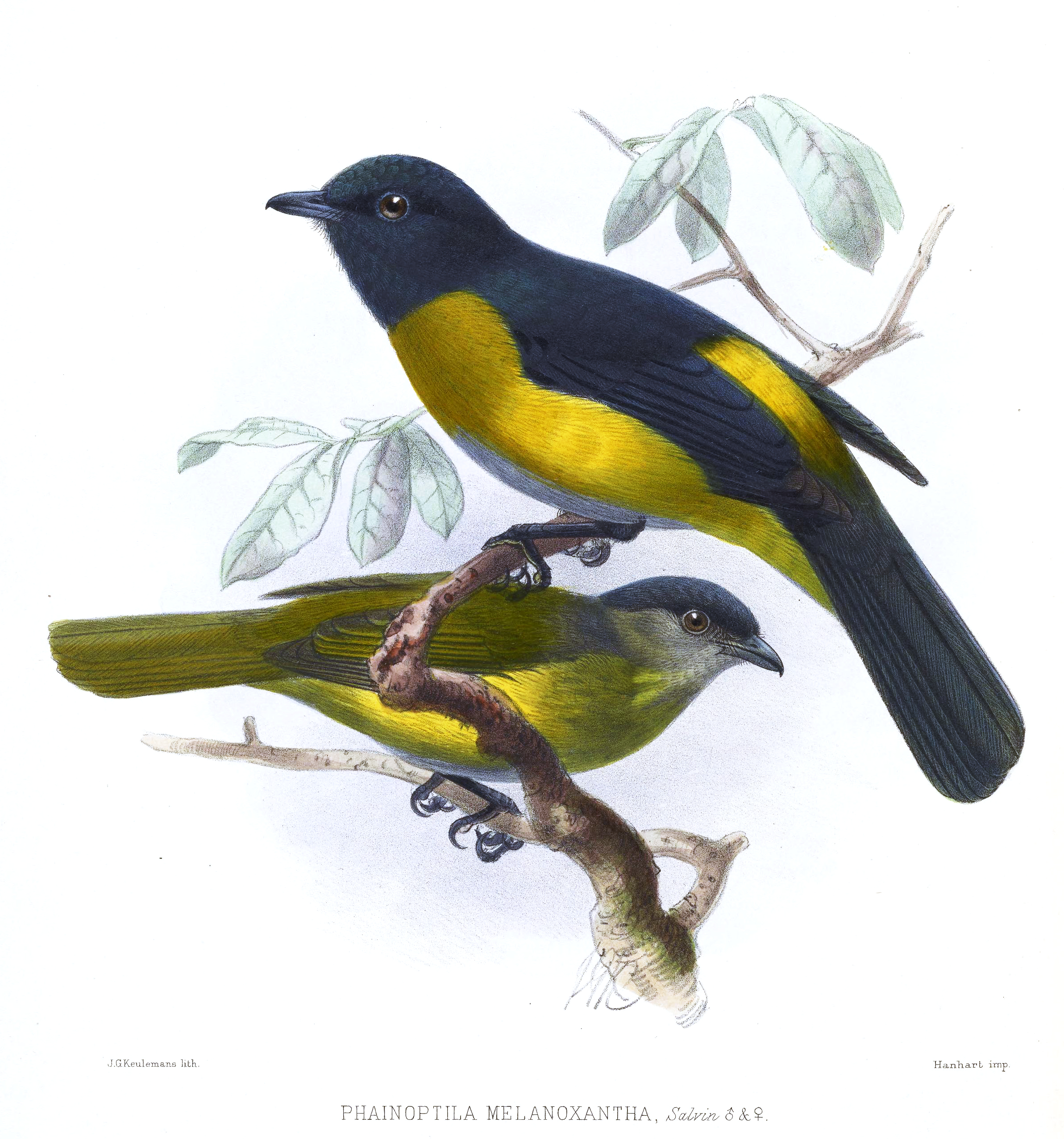

== Description ==
The black-and-yellow phainoptila is about 20 cm (7.9 in) long. It weighs an average of 60 g (2.1 oz). It is a heavy-bodied bird with a wide rounded tail. Adult males of the nominate subspecies have a black head, back, wings, and tail. Their rump is bright yellow. Their throat is black, their breast olive-green, the center of their belly gray, and the rest of their belly, sides, flanks, and undertail coverts bright yellow. Adult females have a dark gray hindneck, face, and throat that blends through sooty gray to a dark olive-green breast. Juveniles are similar to adult females but duller overall, with a sooty crown, faint dusky streaks on the breast, and olive-green flanks. Males of subspecies P. m. parkeri have a completely yellow breast (without the nominate's gray center) and females have a different pattern of streaks on the breast. Both subspecies have a dull red iris, a black bill, and black legs and feet with yellow soles.

== Distribution and habitat ==
Subspecies P. m. parkeri of the black-and-yellow phainoptila is found in the Tilarán and Guanacaste cordilleras in northern Costa Rica. The nominate subspecies is found in the Cordillera Central in central Costa Rica and the Cordillera de Talamanca which extends from south-central Costa Rica into western Panama. The ranges are separated from each other by deep river valleys in which the phainoptila is not found.

The black-and-yellow phainoptila inhabits elfin forest and upper montane evergreen forest in the subtropical and temperate zones. Overall it ranges in elevation from 1,200 to 3,000 m (3,900 to 9,800 ft). Subspecies P. m. parkeri is found from 1,200 m (3,900 ft) and the nominate from 1,800 m (5,900 ft) to the timber line.

== Behavior ==
=== Movement ===
The black-and-yellow phainoptila is a generally a year-round resident. However, there is a suggestion that it breeds in the lower elevations of its range and moves higher after breeding.

=== Feeding ===
The black-and-yellow phainoptila feeds almost exclusively on fruits though it is known to include very small numbers of insects in its diet. Fruits from at least 36 genera of plants have been documented. It plucks fruit mostly while perched and take insects in mid-air. It forages mostly in the forest's middle levels. It has been documented briefly joining flocks of Chlorospingus sparrows.

=== Breeding ===
The black-and-yellow phainoptila breeds mostly between March and May, the highlands' rainy season. The species' nest is a cup made from green moss with some plant fibers and lined with fine rootlets and stems. Nests have been found between about 1.5 and 4 m (5 and 13 ft) above the ground in saplings and trees. The usual clutch is two eggs that are grayish white covered with dark spots. The incubation period, time to fledging, and details of parental care are not known.

=== Vocalization ===
The black-and-yellow phainoptila apparently does not sing. Its calls are "[h]igh, sharp, rather soft tsitting and tseeping notes" whose tempo and volume increase before flight.

== Status ==
The IUCN has assessed the black-and-yellow phainoptila as being of Least Concern. It has a large range; its estimated population of between 20,000 and 50,000 mature individuals is believed to be decreasing. No immediate threats have been identified. It is considered fairly common in Costa Rica.
