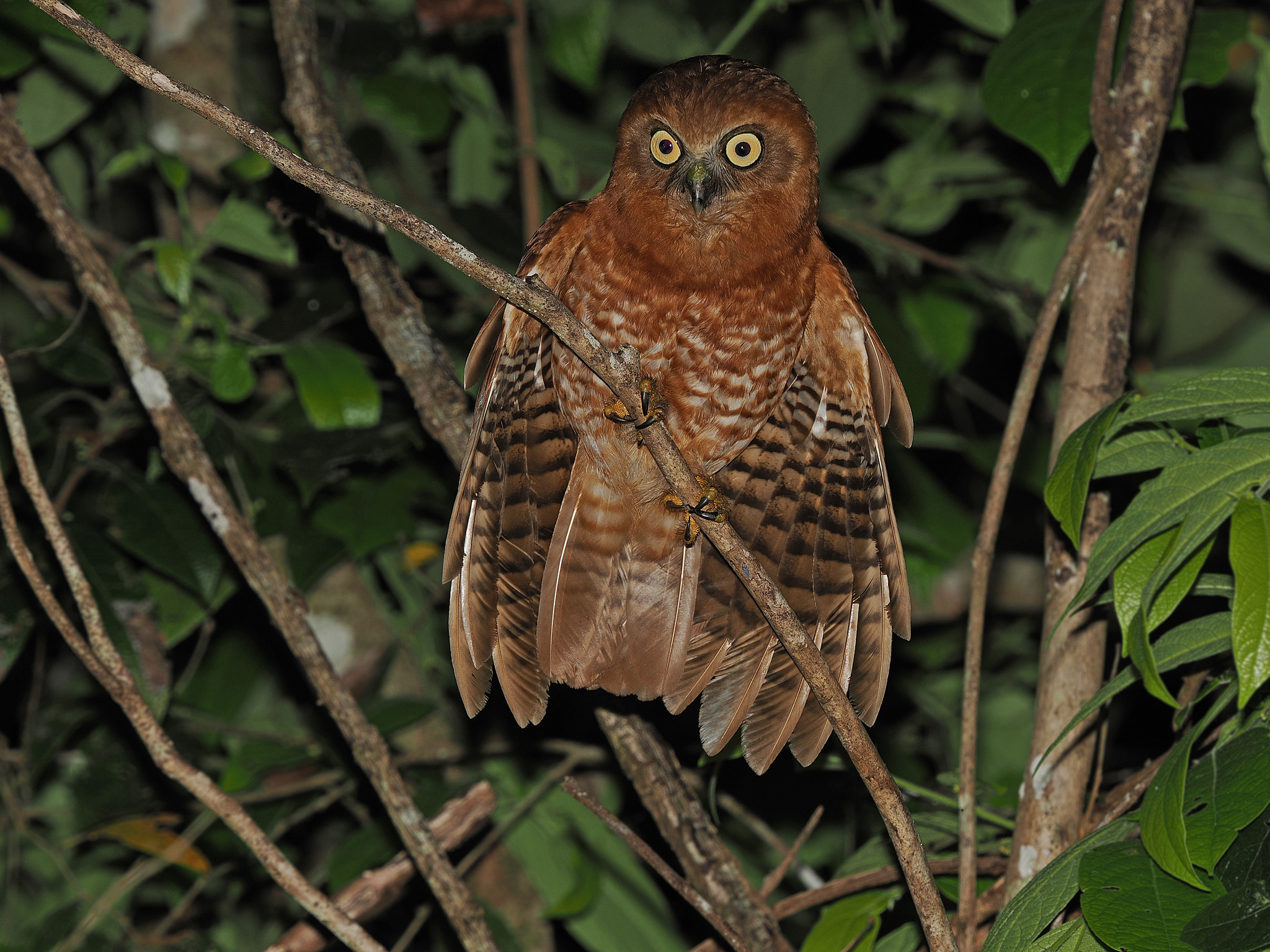

Conservation status
- Least Concern (IUCN 3.1)
- CITES Appendix II

Scientific classification
- Kingdom: Animalia
- Phylum: Chordata
- Class: Aves
- Order: Strigiformes
- Family: Strigidae
- Genus: Ninox
- Species: N. forbesi

Binomial name
- Ninox forbesi Sclater, PL, 1883

= Tanimbar boobook =

Species of owl

The Tanimbar boobook, or Tanimbar hawk-owl (Ninox forbesi), is a species of owl in the family Strigidae. It is found in the Tanimbar Islands of Indonesia. Its natural habitat is subtropical or tropical moist lowland forests. It is threatened by habitat loss. It used to be considered a subspecies of the Moluccan boobook.
