= Gustav Hartlaub =

German physician and ornithologist

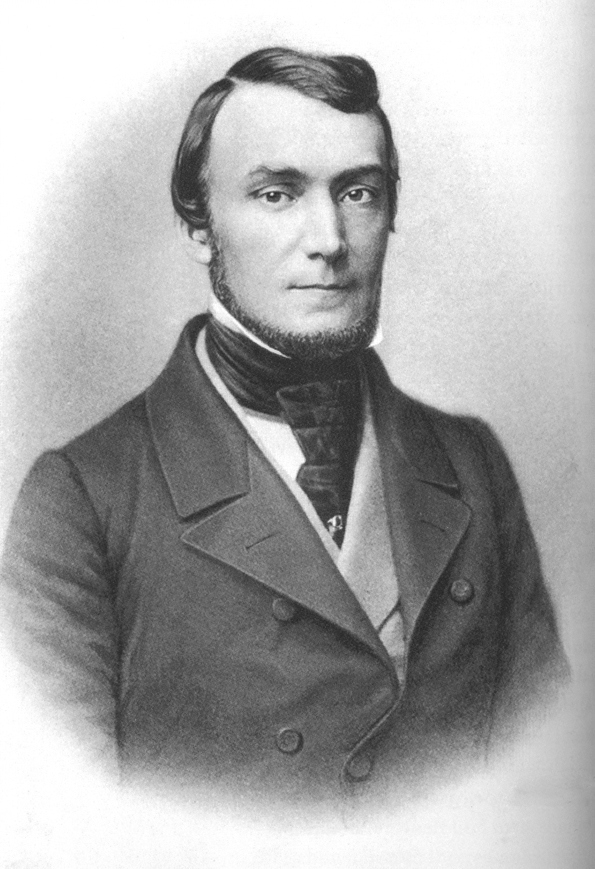
- Born: 8 November 1814; Bremen, Germany
- Died: 29 November 1900 (aged 86)
- Education: University of Göttingen
- Known for: Work on exotic birds
- Scientific career
- Fields: Physician and ornithologist
- Author abbrev. (zoology): Hartlaub

Karel Johan Gustav Hartlaub (8 November 1814 – 29 November 1900) was a German physician and ornithologist.

Hartlaub was born in Bremen, and studied at Bonn and Berlin before graduating in medicine at Göttingen. In 1840, he began to study and collect exotic birds, which he donated to the Bremen Natural History Museum. He described some of these species for the first time. In 1852, he set up a new journal with Jean Cabanis, the Journal für Ornithologie. He wrote with Otto Finsch, Beitrag zur Fauna Centralpolynesiens: Ornithologie der Viti-, Samoa und Tonga- Inseln. This 1867 work which has handcoloured lithographs was based on bird specimens collected by Eduard Heinrich Graeffe for Museum Godeffroy. A number of birds were named for him, including Hartlaub's Bustard, Hartlaub's Turaco, Hartlaub's Duck, and Hartlaub's Gull.
