= Journal of Ornithology =

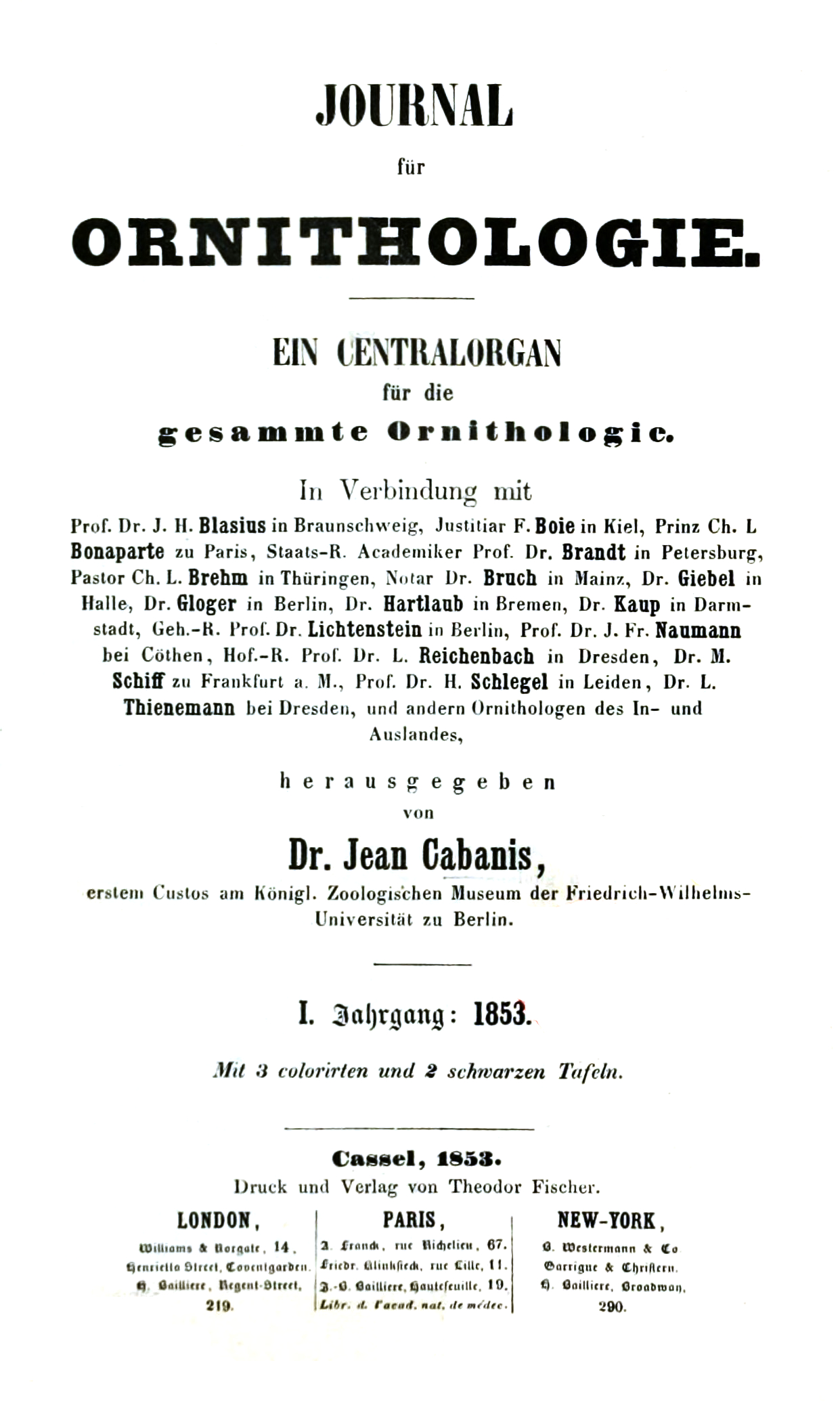
- Title page of the first issue, 1853
- Discipline: Ornithology
- Language: English
- Edited by: Franz Bairlein

Publication details
- Former name(s): Journal für Ornithologie
- History: 1853–present
- Publisher: Springer Science+Business Media on behalf of the Deutsche Ornithologen-Gesellschaft
- Frequency: Quarterly
- Impact factor: 1.711 (2014)

Standard abbreviations
- ISO 4: J. Ornithol.

Indexing
- Journal für Ornithologie
- CODEN: JORNAH
- ISSN: 0021-8375 (print); 1439-0361 (web)
- LCCN: 2005252102
- OCLC no.: 754654105
- Journal of Ornithology
- ISSN: 2193-7192 (print); 2193-7206 (web)

Links
- Journal homepage; Online access; Online archive

The Journal of Ornithology (formerly Journal für Ornithologie) is a scientific journal published by Springer Science+Business Media on behalf of the Deutsche Ornithologen-Gesellschaft. It was founded by Jean Cabanis in 1853, becoming the official journal of the Deutsche Ornithologen-Gesellschaft in 1854.

The first issue was produced in January 1853 and Cabanis noted that although there were specialist journals in entomology and conchology that there was nothing to deal with ornithology in Germany. Among the first essays published in the journal, was an essay by Reichenbach on the concept of species.

According to the Journal Citation Reports, the journal has a 2012 impact factor of 1.632.

== See also ==
- List of ornithology journals
