= Biologia Centrali-Americana =

Encyclopedia of the natural history of Mexico and Central America

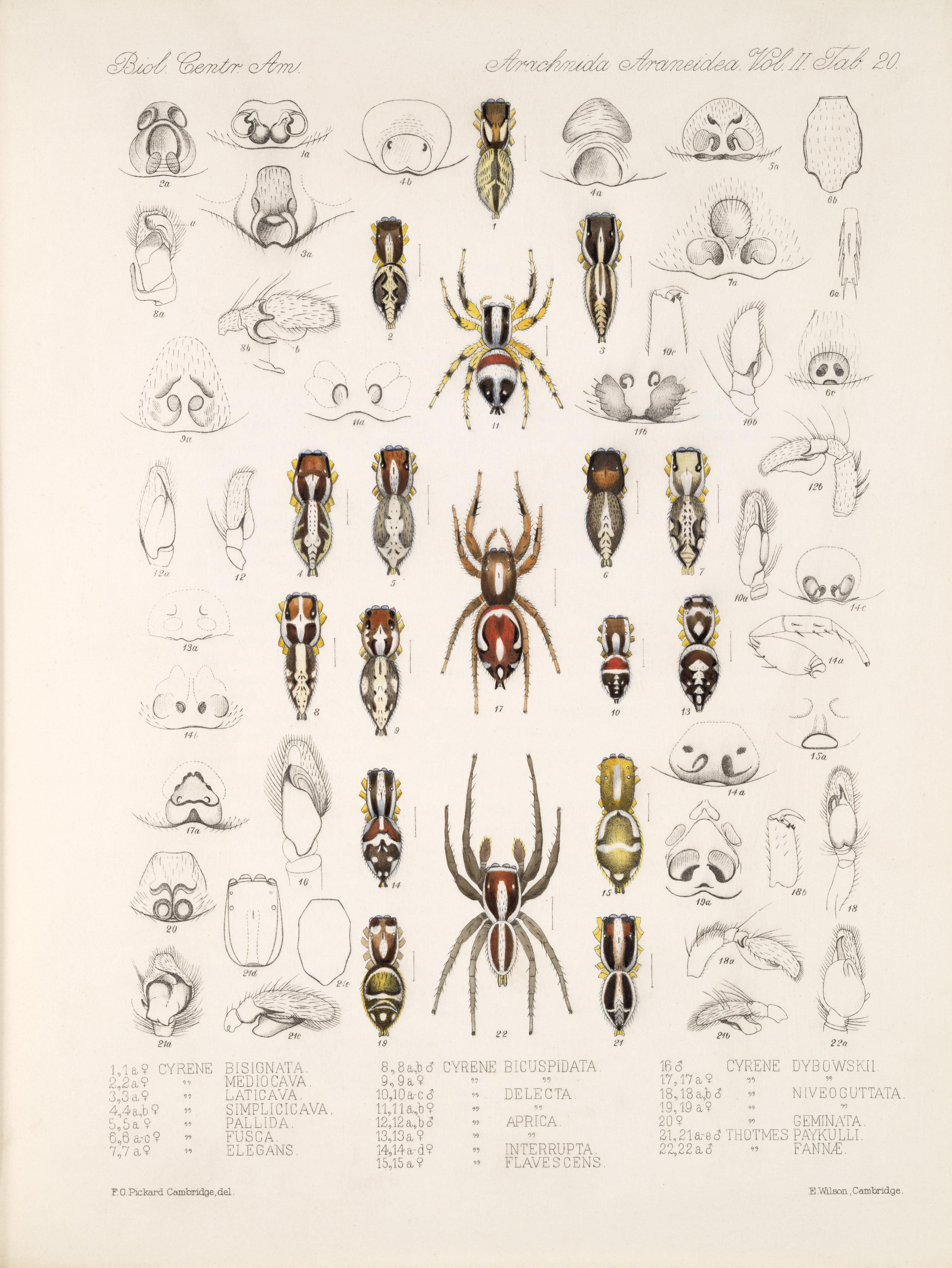
Jumping spider illustrations from Biologia Centrali-Americana

The Biologia Centrali-Americana is an encyclopedia of the natural history of Mexico and Central America, privately issued in 215 parts from 1879 to 1915 by the editors Frederick DuCane Godman and Osbert Salvin, of the British Museum (Natural History) in London. It was begun by Alfred Maudslay publishing his first long-form description of the Archaeology at Chichen Itza (London: R.H. Porter and Dulau, 1889–1902).

This work is still fundamental for the study of Neotropical plants and animals, because it contains almost all that was known of the biodiversity of Mexico and Central America at the time of its publication. Leading scientists of the day were the authors of the volumes. The whole series has 63 volumes with 1677 lithograph plates (more than 900 of which are in color) depicting 18,587 subjects. In total, 50,263 species are treated, of which 19,263 are described as new. Archaeology was added to the already monumental project because of new discoveries in the region.

Since the Biologia Centrali-Americana was published, several volumes have been reprinted, but on the whole the series is rare in libraries and mostly absent from Latin American research institutions. The original volumes were printed on acid paper and have suffered from handling of the now brittle pages.

The Smithsonian Institution has digitized the encyclopedia for distribution via the internet. All the volumes are available at the Biodiversity Heritage Library.

== Source ==
- Lyal, C.H.C. (2011). "The dating of the Biologia Centrali-Americana". Zoological Bibliography. 1 (2): 67–100.
