= German Ornithologists' Society =

German scientific society founded in 1850

The German Ornithologists' Society (since 2024 German: Deutsche Ornithologische Gesellschaft, until then German: Deutsche Ornithologen-Gesellschaft) was founded in 1850, and is one of the world's oldest existing scientific societies. Its goal is to support and further scientific ornithology in Germany on all levels. It publishes the Journal of Ornithology, founded in 1853.
