= Ibis (journal) =

- Discipline: Ornithology
- Language: English
- Edited by: Dominic J. McCafferty

Publication details
- History: 1859–present
- Publisher: Wiley-Blackwell on behalf of the British Ornithologists' Union (United Kingdom)
- Frequency: Quarterly
- Impact factor: 1.804 (2015)

Standard abbreviations
- ISO 4: Ibis

Indexing
- ISSN: 1474-919X

Links
- Journal homepage; Online access; Online archive

Ibis (formerly The Ibis), subtitled the International Journal of Avian Science, is the peer-reviewed scientific journal of the British Ornithologists' Union. It was established in 1859. Topics covered include ecology, conservation, behaviour, palaeontology, and taxonomy of birds. The editor-in-chief is Dominic J. McCafferty (University of Glasgow). The journal is published by Wiley-Blackwell in print and online. It is available free on the internet for institutions in the developing world through the OARE scheme (Online Access to Research in the Environment).

== History ==
In 1858 the British Ornithologists' Union (BOU) was formed. It was the first organization, devoted solely to the study of birds. One year later members of the BOU founded a (Quarterly) "Magazine of General Ornithology," entitled The Ibis.

In the preface of the first issue of The Ibis the editor, Philip Lutley Sclater, recalls that in a meeting in the autumn of 1857 a group of ornithologists who would soon establish the British Ornithologists' Union, there was a "strong feeling that it would be advisable to establish a Magazine devoted solely to Ornithology." A year later, in what was called "the annual assemblage" of November 1858, it was determined, after due consideration, "by those present that a Quarterly Magazine of General Ornithology should be established, that a limited subscription should be entered into to provide a fund for that purpose, and that the subscribers should form an 'Ornithological Union'.

=== Series and editors ===
- Series 1 was published from 1859 to 1864, in six volumes and 24 issues. The first editor was Philip Lutley Sclater (1829–1913).
- Series 2 was published from 1865 to 1870, again in six volumes and 24 issues. The editor was Alfred Newton (1829–1907).
- Series 3: 1871–1876 (six volumes, 24 issues). Editor: Osbert Salvin (1835–1898).
- Series 4: 1877–1882 (six volumes, 24 issues). Editors: Osbert Salvin and Philip Lutley Sclater.
- Series 5: 1883–1888 (six volumes). Editors: P.L. Sclater and Howard Saunders.
- Series 6: 1889–1894 (six volumes). Editor: P.L. Sclater.
- Series 7: 1895–1900 (six volumes). Editors: P.L. Sclater and Howard Saunders.
- Series 8: 1901–1906 (six volumes). Editors: P.L. Sclater and Arthur Humble Evans.
- Series 9: 1907–1912 (six volumes). Editors: P.L. Sclater and Arthur Humble Evans.
- Series 10: 1913–1918 (six volumes). Editor: William Lutley Sclater, the son of P.L. Sclater.
- Series 11: 1919–1924 (six volumes). Editor: W.L. Sclater.
- Series 12: 1925–1930 (six volumes).
- Series 13: 1931–1936 (six volumes). Editor: Claud Buchanan Ticehurst.
- Series 14: 1937–1942 (six volumes).
- From 1943 onward the volumes are numbered 85 etc.

=== Geographical ornithology ===
In the first eighty years of its existence, a very large part of the contents of The Ibis was devoted to what is called "geographical ornithology", "the study of the birds of the different countries of the world" in the words of P.L. Sclater. Sclater had given the start to this important trend in scientific ornithology in his 1858 article in the Journal of the Proceedings of the Linnean Society of London, entitled "On the Geographic Distribution of the Members of the Class Aves". In this period British ornithology reflected the development of Britain as an empire.

== See also ==
- List of ornithology journals

== Sources ==
- Johnson, Kristin (2004). ""The Ibis": Transformations in a Twentieth Century British Natural History Journal". Journal of the History of Biology. 37 (3): 515–555. doi:10.1007/s10739-004-1499-3. JSTOR 4331898. S2CID 83849594.
- Moreau, R.E. (1959). "The Centenarian 'Ibis'". Ibis. 101 (1): 19–38. doi:10.1111/j.1474-919X.1959.tb02353.x.
- Sclater, Philip Lutley (1859). "Preface". The Ibis. 1: i–v.
