= 1853 in birding and ornithology =

- Years in birding and ornithology: 1850 1851 1852 1853 1854 1855 1856
- Centuries: 18th century · 19th century · 20th century
- Decades: 1820s 1830s 1840s 1850s 1860s 1870s 1880s
- Years: 1850 1851 1852 1853 1854 1855 1856

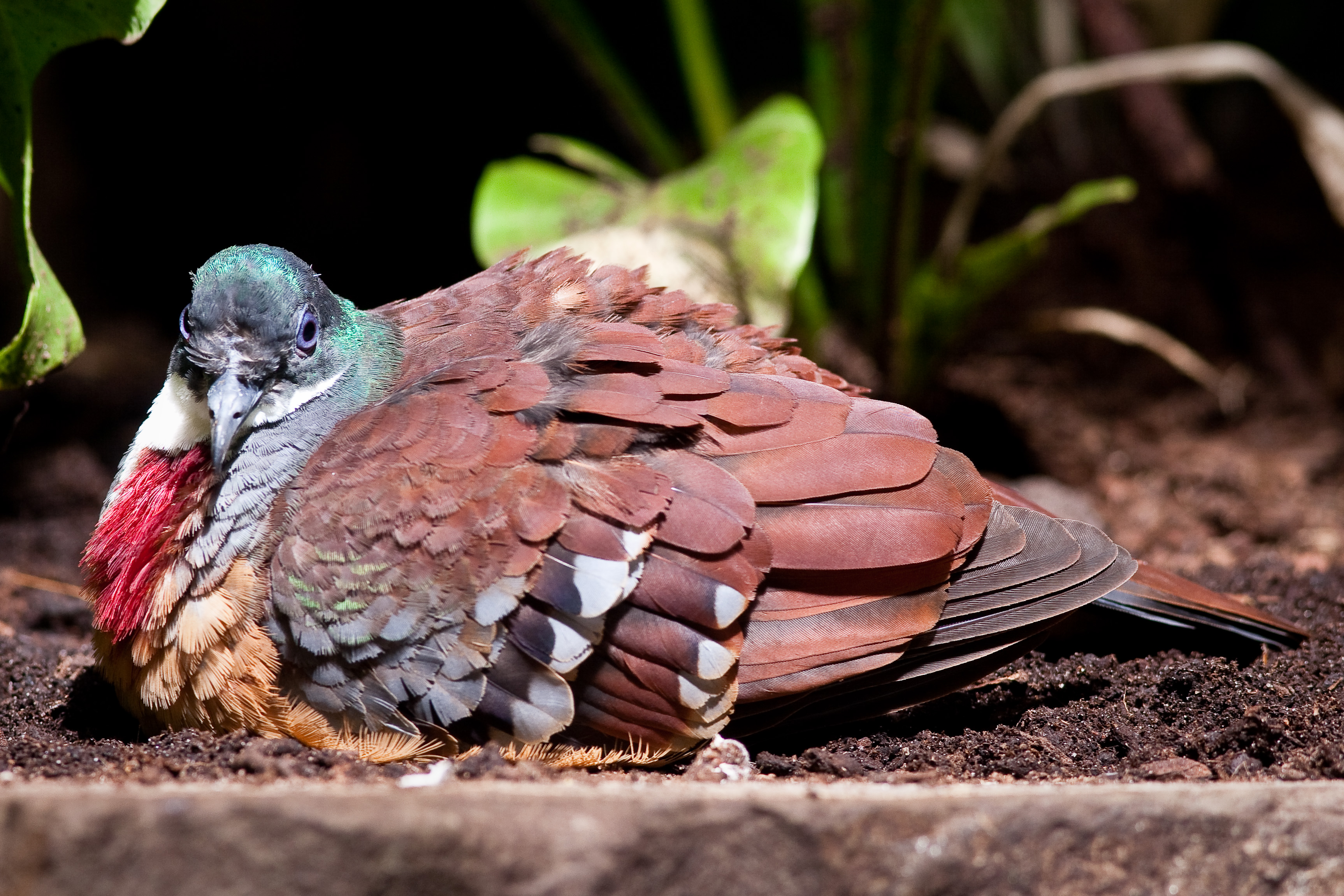
The Mindanao bleeding-heart was described in 1853

Birds described in 1853 include white-thighed swallow, black oropendola, black-breasted barbet, butterfly coquette, carunculated caracara, Fraser's eagle-owl, oriole whistler, ornate flycatcher, Philippine megapode, three-wattled bellbird, yellow-breasted racket-tail

== Events ==
- Death of Hugh Edwin Strickland, Émile Deville

== Publications ==
- John Cassin Illustrations of the Birds of California, Texas, Oregon, British and Russian America (1853–56)
- Gustav Hartlaub and Jean Cabanis, found the Journal für Ornithologie
- Johann Wilhelm von Müller begins Beiträge zur Ornithologie Afrikas (1853-1870)
- Charles John Andersson reaches Lake Ngami
- Emmanuel Le Maout publishes Histoire naturelle des oiseaux, suivant la classification de Isidore Geoffroy Saint-Hilaire, avec l'indication de leurs moeurs, et de leurs raports avec les art, le commerce et l'agriculture.
- Jean-Baptiste Bailly begins publishing an Ornithology of Savoy (1853-1854)
- Charles Lucien Bonaparte 1853. Notes sur les collections rapportées en 1853, par M. A. Delattre, de son voyage en Californie et dans le Nicaragua. Compte Rendu des Séances de l'Académie des Sciences. Mallet-Bachelier. Paris.online BHL
- Jules Bourcier, 1853 Nouvelle espèces du genre Metallura, Gould. Revue et magasin de zoologie pure et appliquée (= 2). Band 5, 1853, S. 295–296 online BHL

Ongoing events

- John Gould The birds of Australia; Supplement 1851–69. 1 vol. 81 plates; Artists: J. Gould and H. C. Richter; Lithographer: H. C. Richter
- John Gould The birds of Asia; 1850-83 7 vols. 530 plates, Artists: J. Gould, H. C. Richter, W. Hart and J. Wolf; Lithographers:H. C. Richter and W. Hart
