= 1859 in birding and ornithology =

- Years in birding and ornithology: 1856 1857 1858 1859 1860 1861 1862
- Centuries: 18th century · 19th century · 20th century
- Decades: 1820s 1830s 1840s 1850s 1860s 1870s 1880s
- Years: 1856 1857 1858 1859 1860 1861 1862

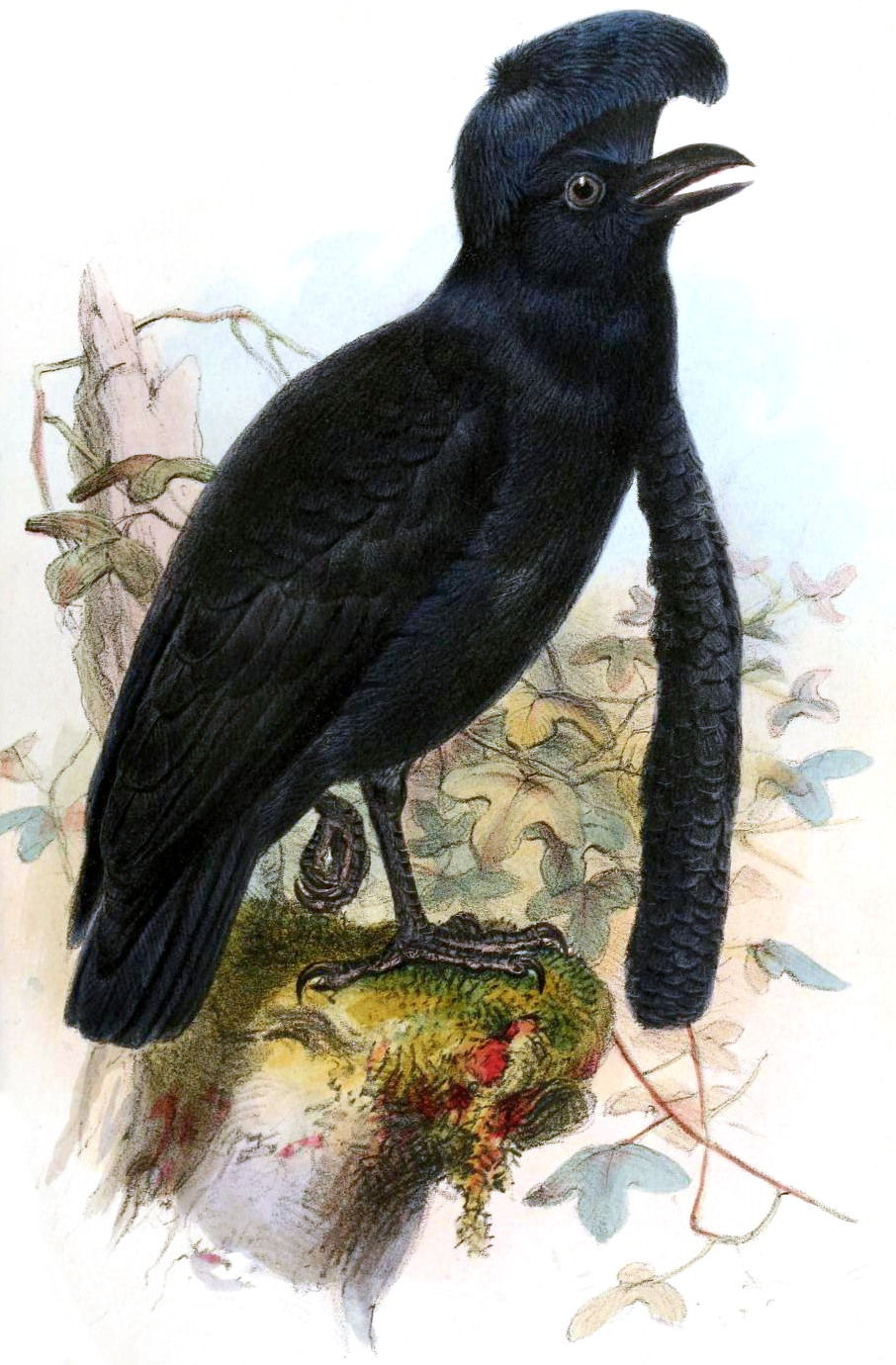
Long-wattled umbrellabird. Illustration from Ibis 1859

- On the Origin of Species published.
- Copenhagen Zoo founded by Niels Kjærbølling.
- Henry Baker Tristram and Osbert Salvin publishes Characters of apparently new species of Birds collected in the great Desert of the Sahara, southwards of Algeria, and Tunis in the first volume of Ibis.
- Thomas Henry Huxley describes the fossil penguin Palaeeudyptes.
- Jean Cabanis and Ferdinand Heine publish Theil II die Schreivögel Museum Heineanum: Verzeichniss der ornithologischen Sammlung des Oberamtmann Ferdinand Heine, auf Gut St. Burchard vor Halberstadt, Museum Ornithologium Heineanum.
- Emile Blanchard Recherches sur les caractères ostéologiques des oiseaux appliqués à la classification naturelle de ces animaux Annales des Sciences Naturelles., t. XI, 1859 online BHL
- Birds described in 1859 include one-colored becard, rufous-fronted wood quail, Tristram's warbler, chestnut-crowned foliage-gleaner, and yellow-bellied warbler.
- Foundation of Museum of Comparative Zoology.
- The Ibis commences

Expeditions

- 1857–1860 SMS Novara Ornithology directed by Johann Zelebor.

Ongoing events

- John Gould The birds of Australia; Supplement 1851–69. 1 vol. 81 plates; Artists: J. Gould and H. C. Richter; Lithographer: H. C. Richter
- John Gould The birds of Asia; 1850-83 7 vols. 530 plates, Artists: J. Gould, H. C. Richter, W. Hart and J. Wolf; Lithographers:H. C. Richter and W. Hart
