= 1865 in birding and ornithology =

- Years in birding and ornithology: 1862 1863 1864 1865 1866 1867 1868
- Centuries: 18th century · 19th century · 20th century
- Decades: 1830s 1840s 1850s 1860s 1870s 1880s 1890s
- Years: 1862 1863 1864 1865 1866 1867 1868

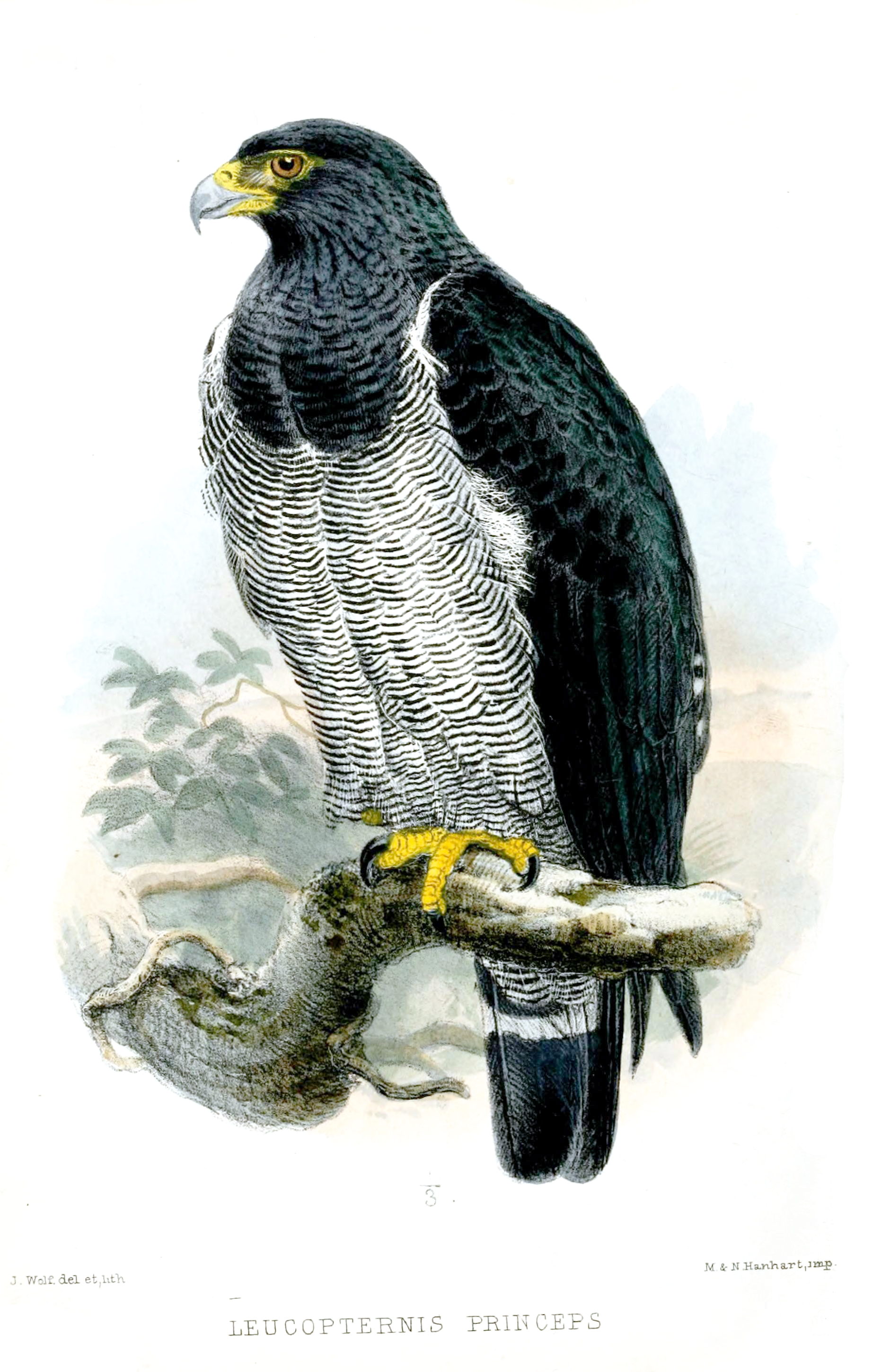
Barred hawk Proceedings of the Zoological Society of London 1865 volume

- Birds described in 1865 include volcano hummingbird, white-fronted tit, Monteiro's hornbill, biscutate swift, bare-cheeked babbler, rufous-throated flycatcher, chestnut-rumped thornbill
- Osbert Salvin Descriptions of Seventeen New Species of Birds from Costa Rica.Proceedings of the Zoological Society of London 1864
- Death of German explorer Karl Klaus von der Decken.
- Death of Thomas Bellerby Wilson
- Death of Alfred Malherbe
- 1865 heralds rapid expansion of the collections of Cambridge University Museum of Zoology.
- Description of the fossil swan Cygnus falconeri.

Expeditions

- 1865–1868 Magenta circumnavigation of the globe Italian expedition that made important scientific observations in South America.
- 1865– HMS Curacoa
- Alfred Grandidier makes his first visit to Madagascar.

Ongoing events

- John Gould The birds of Australia Supplement 1851–69. 1 vol. 81 plates; Artists: J. Gould and H. C. Richter; Lithographer: H. C. Richter
- John Gould The birds of Asia 1850-83 7 vols. 530 plates, Artists: J. Gould, H. C. Richter, W. Hart and J. Wolf; Lithographers:H. C. Richter and W. Hart
- The Ibis
