= 1858 in birding and ornithology =

- Years in birding and ornithology: 1855 1856 1857 1858 1859 1860 1861
- Centuries: 18th century · 19th century · 20th century
- Decades: 1820s 1830s 1840s 1850s 1860s 1870s 1880s
- Years: 1855 1856 1857 1858 1859 1860 1861

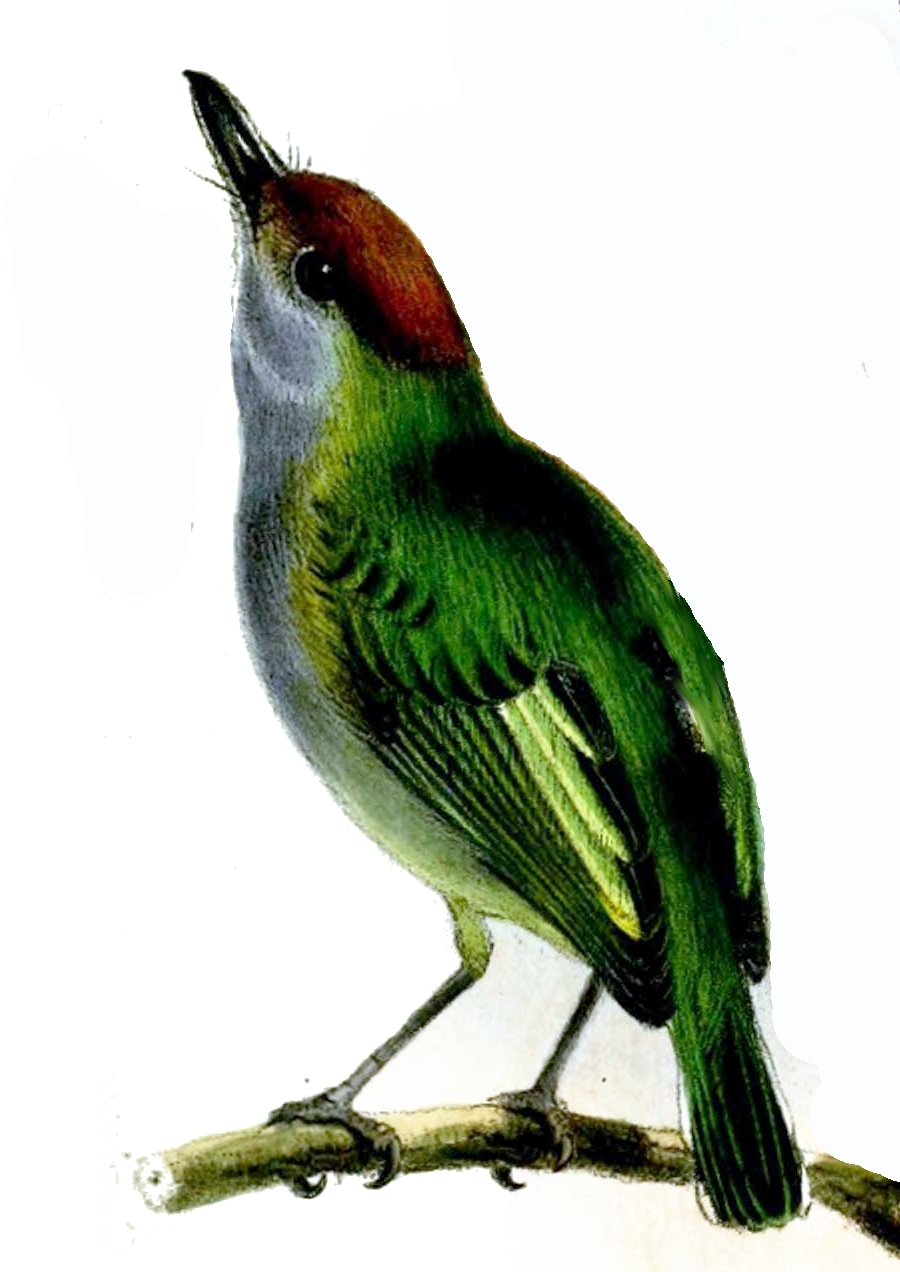
Black-and-white tody-tyrant Proceedings of the Zoological Society of London for 1857 published in 1858

- Birds described in 1858 include phainopepla, northwestern crow, red-necked crake, white-headed wood hoopoe, Wallace's fruit-dove, Arctic warbler
- George Robert Gray publishes A list of the birds, with descriptions of new species obtained by Mr. Alfred R. Wallace in the Aru and Ké Islands in the Proceedings of the Zoological Society of London.
- Heinrich von Kittlitz publishes Denkwürdigkeiten einer Reise nach dem russischen Amerika, nach Mikronesien und durch Kamtschatka.
- British Ornithologists' Union founded.
- Coenraad Jacob Temminck dies. His post at Rijksmuseum van Natuurlijke Historie is awarded to Hermann Schlegel

Expeditions

- 1857–1860 SMS Novara Ornithology directed by Johann Zelebor.

Ongoing events

- John Gould The birds of Australia; Supplement 1851–69. 1 vol. 81 plates; Artists: J. Gould and H. C. Richter; Lithographer: H. C. Richter
- John Gould The birds of Asia; 1850-83 7 vols. 530 plates, Artists: J. Gould, H. C. Richter, W. Hart and J. Wolf; Lithographers:H. C. Richter and W. Hart
