= 1861 in birding and ornithology =

- Years in birding and ornithology: 1858 1859 1860 1861 1862 1863 1864
- Centuries: 18th century · 19th century · 20th century
- Decades: 1830s 1840s 1850s 1860s 1870s 1880s 1890s
- Years: 1858 1859 1860 1861 1862 1863 1864

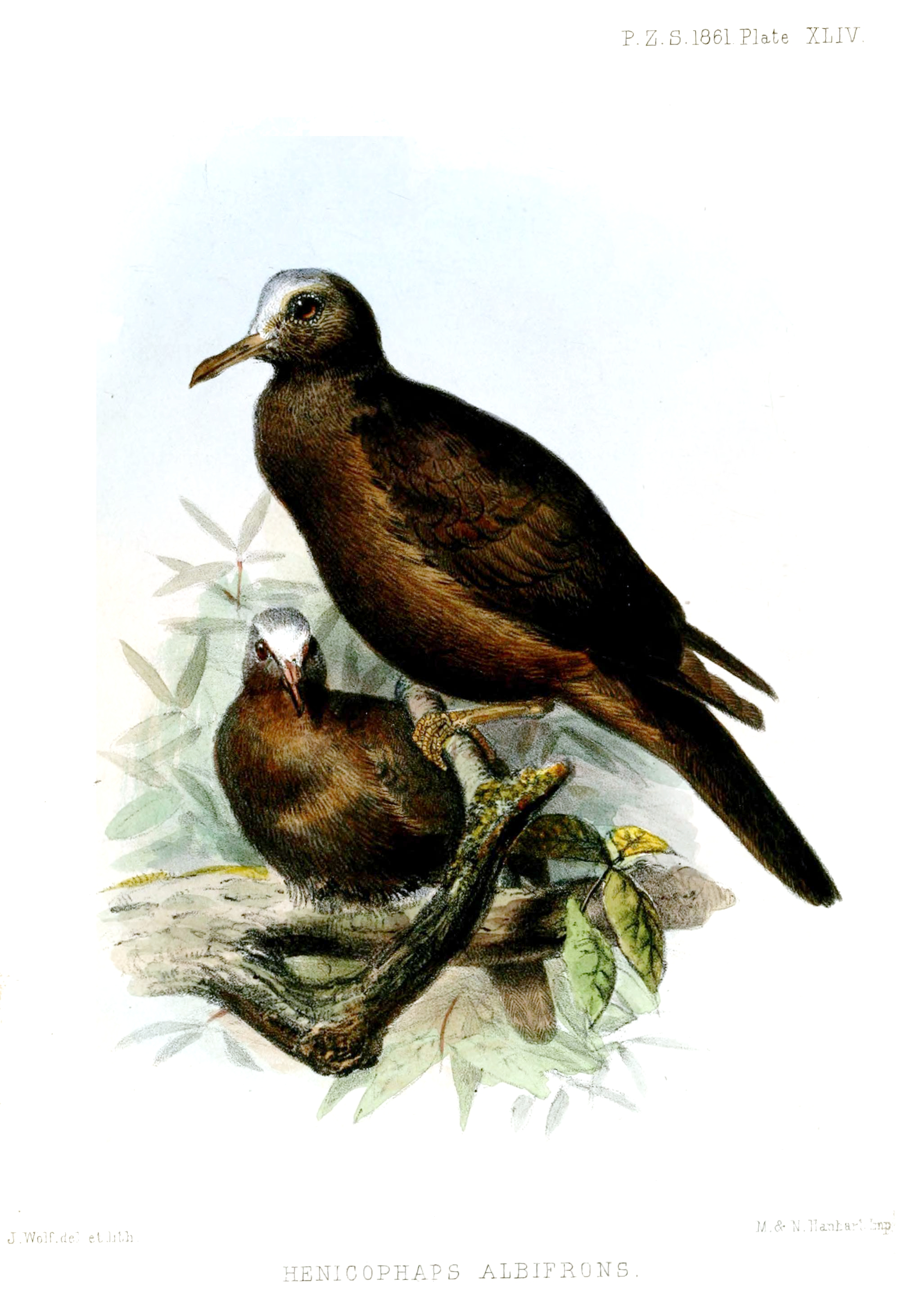
New Guinea bronzewing Proceedings of the Zoological Society of London 1861. Plate by Joseph Wolf

- Archaeopteryx lithographica described by Christian Erich Hermann von Meyer
- Death of Heinrich Rudolf Schinz, Frédéric de Lafresnaye and Édouard Ménétries and Prince Albert. Bird names honouring Prince Albert are Prince Albert's curassow, Menura alberti Albert's lyrebird and Prince Albert's riflebird (Ptiloris magnificus alberti)
- Birds described in 1861 include many-colored Chaco finch, invisible rail, grey-capped tyrannulet, African river martin, black dwarf hornbill, Sulawesi myna, northern nightingale-wren, grey-tailed piha, fiery-billed aracari, Ross's goose,
- Alexander von Homeyer collects birds in the Mediterranean.
- In February The populations of Mascarene martin on Mauritius and Réunion are badly affected by a cyclone.
- John Gould A Monograph of the Trochilidae or Humming Birds with 360 plates Volume 5 Species described in this work include scaly-breasted hummingbird, violet-tailed sylph and bronze-tailed plumeleteer.
- Philip Sclater On the American Barbets (Capitoniae) Ibis, 3: 182–190.online
- George Robert Gray Remarks on, and descriptions of, new species of birds lately sent by Mr. A. R. Wallace, from Waigiou, Mysol and Gagie Islands. Proceedings of the Zoological Society of London, 1861
- Theodor von Heuglin travels to Africa to search for Eduard Vogel and his companions including Werner Munzinger, Gottlob Kinzelbach, and Hermann Steudner.

Ongoing events

- John Gould The birds of Australia; Supplement 1851–69. 1 vol. 81 plates; Artists: J. Gould and H. C. Richter; Lithographer: H. C. Richter
- John Gould The birds of Asia; 1850-83 7 vols. 530 plates, Artists: J. Gould, H. C. Richter, W. Hart and J. Wolf; Lithographers:H. C. Richter and W. Hart
- The Ibis
