= 1864 in birding and ornithology =

- Years in birding and ornithology: 1861 1862 1863 1864 1865 1866 1867
- Centuries: 18th century · 19th century · 20th century
- Decades: 1830s 1840s 1850s 1860s 1870s 1880s 1890s
- Years: 1861 1862 1863 1864 1865 1866 1867

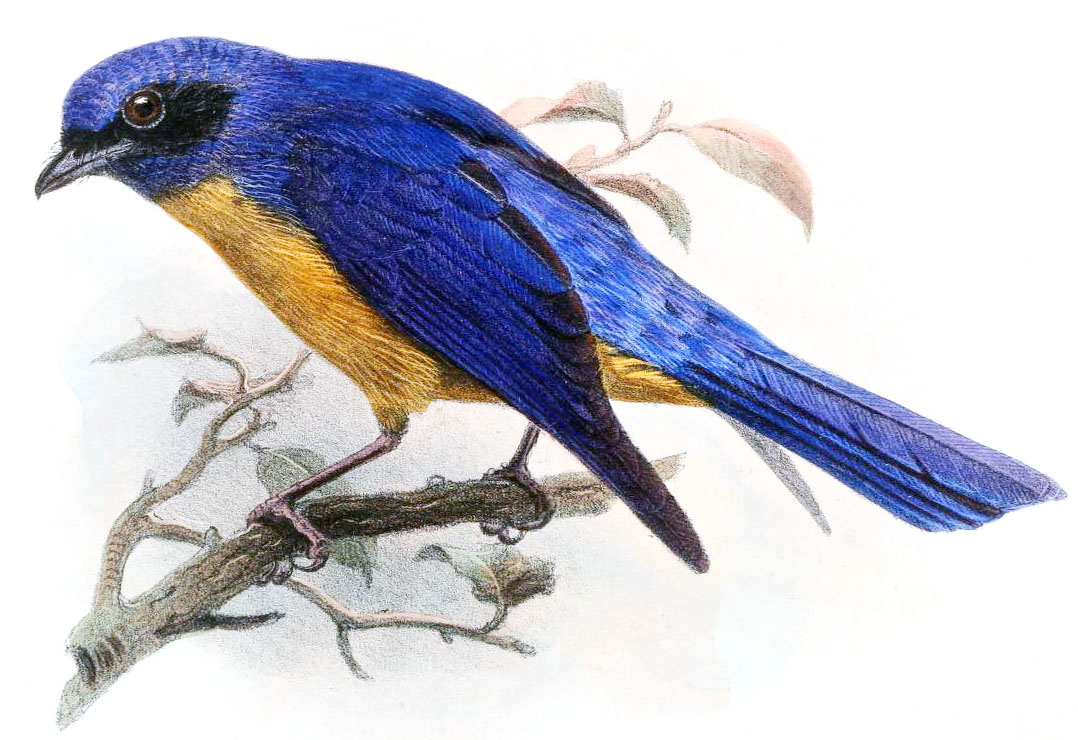
The vivid niltava was described in 1864

- Spencer Fullerton Baird Review of American birds in the Museum of the Smithsonian Institution: pt. 1 Smithsonian Institution Washington, 1864–1872.online Birds described in this work include Sinaloa wren, Pacific wren, wood thrush and black-capped gnatcatcher.
- Birds described in 1864 include Tongan megapode, Livingstone's turaco, plain gerygone, lesser swamp warbler, ashy storm petrel,
- Elliott Coues A critical review of the family Procellaridae Proceedings Philadelphia Academy of Natural Science.
- Lost land of Lemuria postulated.
- Thomas C. Jerdon publishes The Birds of India. Volume II, Part I and The Game Birds and Wildfowl of India
- Death of Christian Ludwig Brehm

Ongoing events

- John Gould The birds of Australia; Supplement 1851–69. 1 vol. 81 plates; Artists: J. Gould and H. C. Richter; Lithographer: H. C. Richter
- John Gould The birds of Asia; 1850-83 7 vols. 530 plates, Artists: J. Gould, H. C. Richter, W. Hart and J. Wolf; Lithographers:H. C. Richter and W. Hart
- The Ibis
