= 1855 in birding and ornithology =

- Years in birding and ornithology: 1852 1853 1854 1855 1856 1857 1858
- Centuries: 18th century · 19th century · 20th century
- Decades: 1820s 1830s 1840s 1850s 1860s 1870s 1880s
- Years: 1852 1853 1854 1855 1856 1857 1858

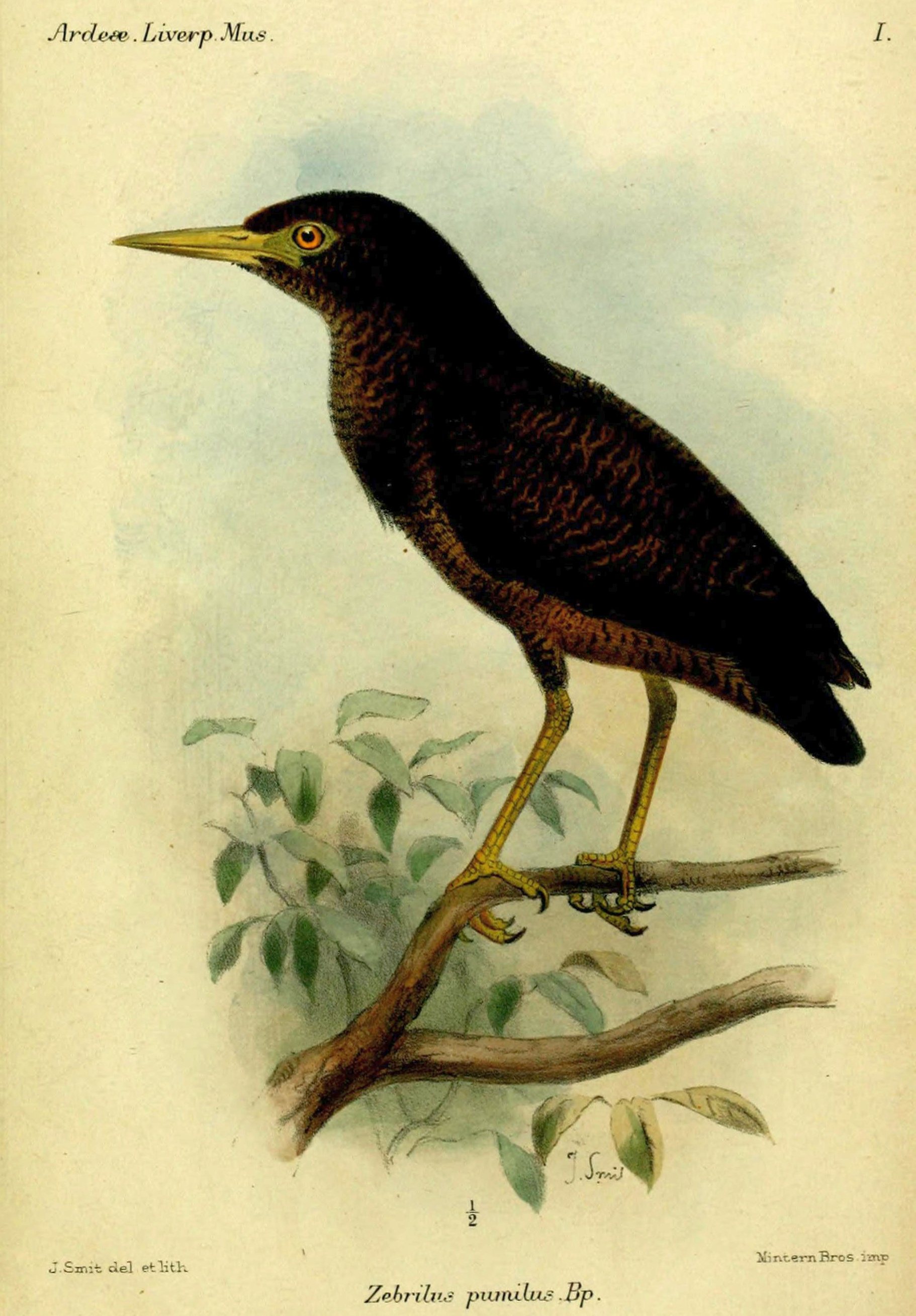
Zigzag heron. Plate by Joseph Smit in the Bulletin of the Liverpool Museum This species was transferred to a new genus Zebrilus erected by Charles Lucien Bonaparte in 1855

- Discovery of the fossil bird Gastornis parisiensis.
- Thomas Campbell Eyton plans a large natural history museum at Eyton Hall.
- Purple-crowned fairywren discovered on Augustus Charles Gregory's northern Australian expedition.
- Birds described in 1855 include Tickell's brown hornbill, Tristan thrush, robust white-eye, sapphire quail-dove,
- William Swainson and Louis Antoine François Baillon die.
- Howard Saunders begins bird studies in Brazil and Chile
- Gustav Radde joins the East Siberian Expedition of 1855, led by the astronomer Ludwig Schwarz.
- John Gould authors Descriptions of Eight New Species of Birds from South America. Proceedings of the Zoological Society of London 1855 Pt 23 no. 288: 67–70. online BHL

Ongoing events

- John Gould The birds of Australia; Supplement 1851–69. 1 vol. 81 plates; Artists: J. Gould and H. C. Richter; Lithographer: H. C. Richter
- John Gould The birds of Asia; 1850-83 7 vols. 530 plates, Artists: J. Gould, H. C. Richter, W. Hart and J. Wolf; Lithographers:H. C. Richter and W. Hart
