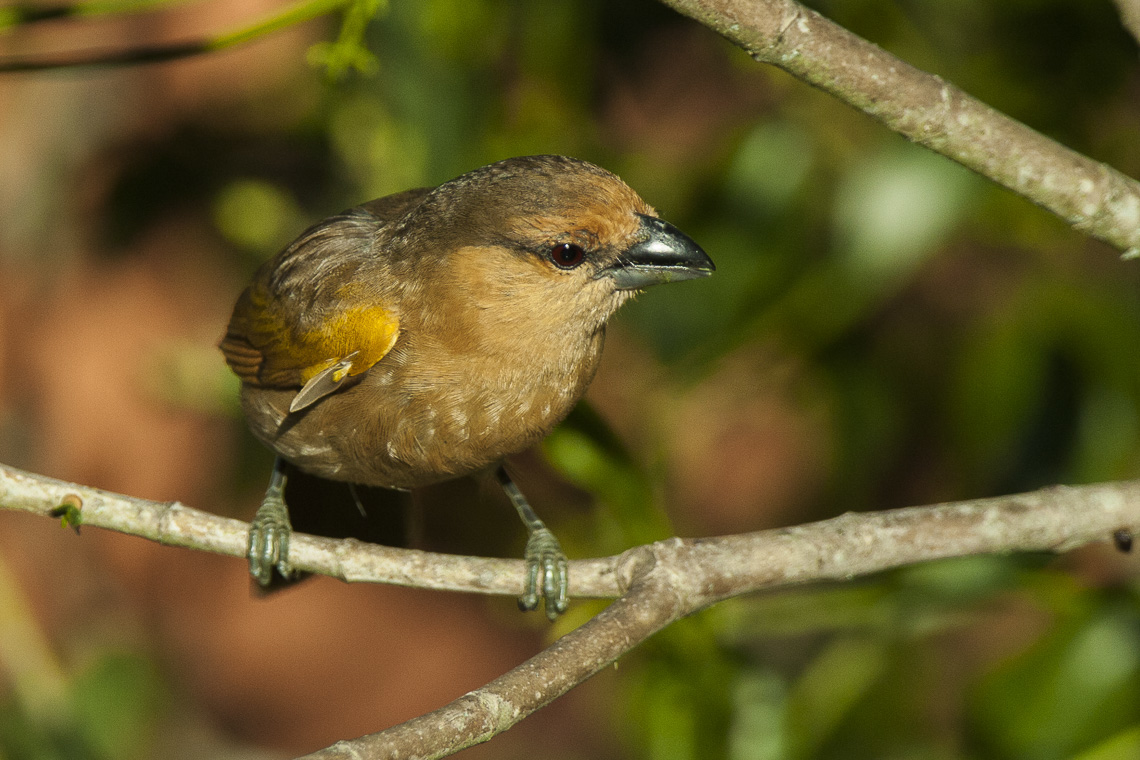
- At Itatiaia National Park, Brazil.

Conservation status
- Near Threatened (IUCN 3.1)

Scientific classification
- Kingdom: Animalia
- Phylum: Chordata
- Class: Aves
- Order: Passeriformes
- Family: Thraupidae
- Genus: Orchesticus; Cabanis, 1851
- Species: O. abeillei

Binomial name
- Orchesticus abeillei (Lesson, 1839)

Synonyms
- Pyrrhula Abeillei (protonym)

= Brown tanager =

Species of bird

The brown tanager (Orchesticus abeillei) is a Near Threatened species of bird in th family Thraupidae, the tanagers and allies. It is endemic to Brazil.

== Taxonomy and systematics ==
The brown tanager was formally described in 1839 by the French naturalist René Lesson with the binomial Pyrrhula Abeillei [sic]. The species was moved to its own monospecific genus Orchesticus in 1851 by the German ornithologist Jean Cabanis. The type locality is Rio de Janeiro in Brazil. The genus name is from the Ancient Greek orkhēstikos meaning "good at dancing". The specific epithet abeillei was chosen to honor the French collector and naturalist M. Abeillé. Within the Thraupidae the brown tanager is placed with the yellow-shouldered grosbeak (Parkerthraustes humeralis) in the subfamily Orchesticinae.

The brown tanager is the only member of its genus and has no subspecies.

== Description ==
The brown tanager is 17 to 18 cm (6.7 to 7.1 in) long and weighs about 31.5 g (1.1 oz). The sexes have the same plumage. Adults have a thin blackish line from the lores through the eye to the nape on an otherwise cinnamon face. They have a brownish mid-crown and nape with a strong gray tinge. Their mantle, back and rump are medium brown. Their upperwing coverts are cinnamon-rufous and their primary coverts dusky with wide rufous edges. Their primaries and secondaries are dusky with cinnamon-rufous edges and their tertials mostly cinnamon rufous with dusky inner webs. Their tail is dusky with a strong rufous tinge. Their throat and underparts are cinnamon-buff and their underwing coverts orange-buff. They have a dark red iris, a thick blackish bill, and horn-colored legs and feet. Because the brown tanager strongly resembles the buff-fronted foliage-gleaner (Philydor rufum), with whom there is range overlap, some authors have suggested that it is an example of social mimicry.

== Distribution and habitat ==
The brown tanager is found in southeastern Brazil from southern Bahia south to eastern Paraná and eastern Santa Catarina. It is a bird of the Atlantic Forest, where it primarily inhabits humid primary forest but also secondary forest, somewhat open woodlands, and parks and gardens with tall trees. In elevation it ranges between 750 and 1,500 m (2,500 and 4,900 ft).

== Behavior ==
=== Movement ===
The brown tanager is believed to be mostly a year-round resident but there are reports of some of the southernmost birds moving north during the austral winter.

=== Feeding ===
The brown tanager feeds primarily on insects and apparently includes small amounts of fruit in its diet. It forages in pairs and small groups in the forest canopy. It picks and probes in live and dead foliage, mosses, and bromeliads and also takes some prey in mid-air with sallies from a perch. It often joins mixed-species feeding flocks.

=== Breeding ===
The brown tanager's breeding season has not been defined but includes October in Rio de Janeiro state. In an apparent courtship display, "male and female faced each other, motionless and upright, with wings drooping, tail depressed and spread". The one known nest was in a bromeliad on a tree trunk. It held two eggs that were pinkish white with reddish blotches. Nothing else is known about the species' breeding biology.

=== Vocalization ===
The brown tanager's dawn song is "an extremely high-pitched sis-sis-sis-sis’sis’sssssssssssssst" whose terminal hiss is weak and easily missed. Its day song is usually a variant of the dawn song. Its call is "extremely high, twittering, like tittsi-tseeh".

== Status ==
The IUCN has assessed the brown tanager as Near Threatened. It has a limited range; its population size is not known and is believed to be decreasing. "Slow to moderate declines are likely to be occurring, owing to on-going habitat loss throughout the range." It is considered "uncommon to rare". It occurs in Itatiaia and Serra dos Órgãos national parks, but the "remaining protected areas are isolated, and almost all unprotected areas are at risk of deforestation".
