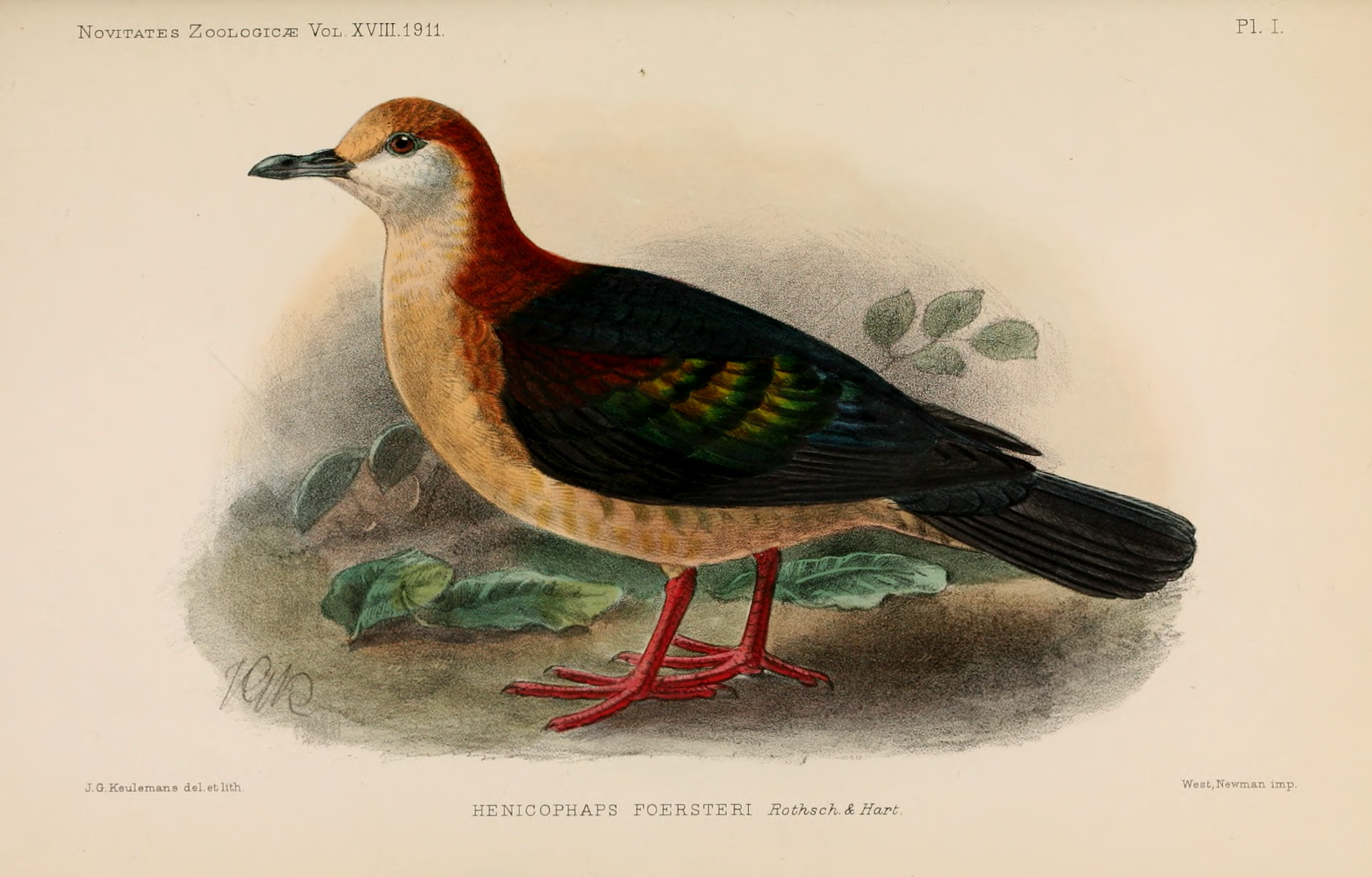

Conservation status
- Vulnerable (IUCN 3.1)

Scientific classification
- Kingdom: Animalia
- Phylum: Chordata
- Class: Aves
- Order: Columbiformes
- Family: Columbidae
- Genus: Henicophaps
- Species: H. foersteri

Binomial name
- Henicophaps foersteri Rothschild & Hartert, 1906
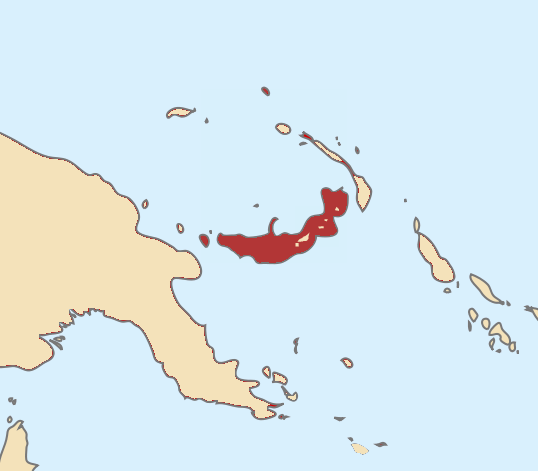
- Distribution of the New Britain Bronzewing

= New Britain bronzewing =

Species of bird

The New Britain bronzewing (Henicophaps foersteri) is a species of bird in the family Columbidae. It is endemic to Papua New Guinea. In 1988, it was rated as a near threatened species on the International Union for Conservation of Nature Red List of Endangered Species. However, in 2000, it was warranted a vulnerable status.

== Description ==
The New Britain bronzewing measures about 38 centimetres (15 in) in length, having 20.5 centimetres (8.1 in) long wingspan. The tail measures 13.7 centimetres (5.4 in), and the bill measures 3 centimetres (1.2 in) in length. It has a buff coloured forehead and a reddish brown crown. The irides and the bill are dark. It has dark brown upperparts, and the chin, throat, and ear feathers are creamy white. The greater and the median coverts are metallic golden green, and the lesser coverts are dark maroon. It has blue iridescent tertials.

It emits a monotonously repeating pip-yia call, with the second note being higher pitched than the first note.

== Distribution and habitat ==
The New Britain bronzewing is endemic to Papua New Guinea. Its natural habitat is old-growth and second-growth lowland forests up to elevations of at least 700 metres (2,300 ft) above sea level.

== Status and conservation ==
In 1988, the New Britain bronzewing was rated as a near threatened species on the IUCN Red List of Endangered Species. However, in 2000, it was warranted a vulnerable status due to its small population numbering less than 5,000, which is probably decreasing due to habitat loss. It is a rare species. It has been recorded in the Poikili and the Garu Wildlife Protection Areas.
