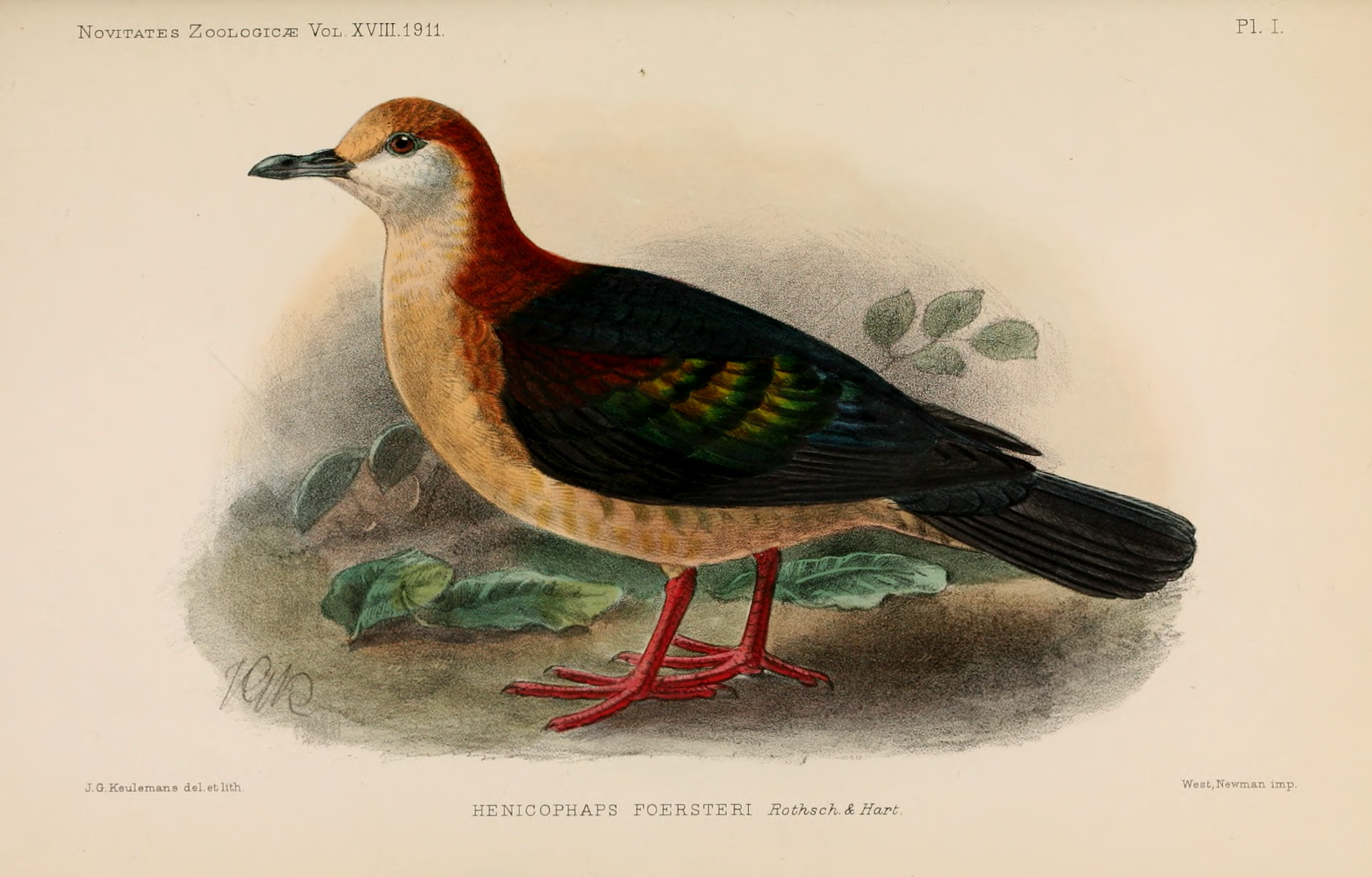
- New Britain bronzewing, Henicophaps foersteri

Scientific classification
- Domain: Eukaryota
- Kingdom: Animalia
- Phylum: Chordata
- Class: Aves
- Order: Columbiformes
- Family: Columbidae
- Subfamily: Columbinae
- Genus: Henicophaps; G.R. Gray, 1862

Type species
- Henicophaps albifrons Gray GR, 1862

Species
- See text

= Henicophaps =

Genus of birds

Henicophaps is a small genus of doves that are endemic to New Guinea and the Bismarck Archipelago. These are stocky pigeons with unusually long heavy bills that live in wet forests and forage primary on the ground.

English zoologist George Robert Gray introduced the genus Henicophaps in 1862 to accommodate the New Guinea bronzewing (Henicophaps albifrons) that had been collected by the naturalist Alfred Russel Wallace on the island of Waigeo, northwest New Guinea. The genus name combines the Ancient Greek henikos meaning "unique" and "phaps" meaning "pigeon".

The genus includes two species.

- New Guinea bronzewing (Henicophaps albifrons)
- New Britain bronzewing (Henicophaps foersteri)
