= 1850 in birding and ornithology =

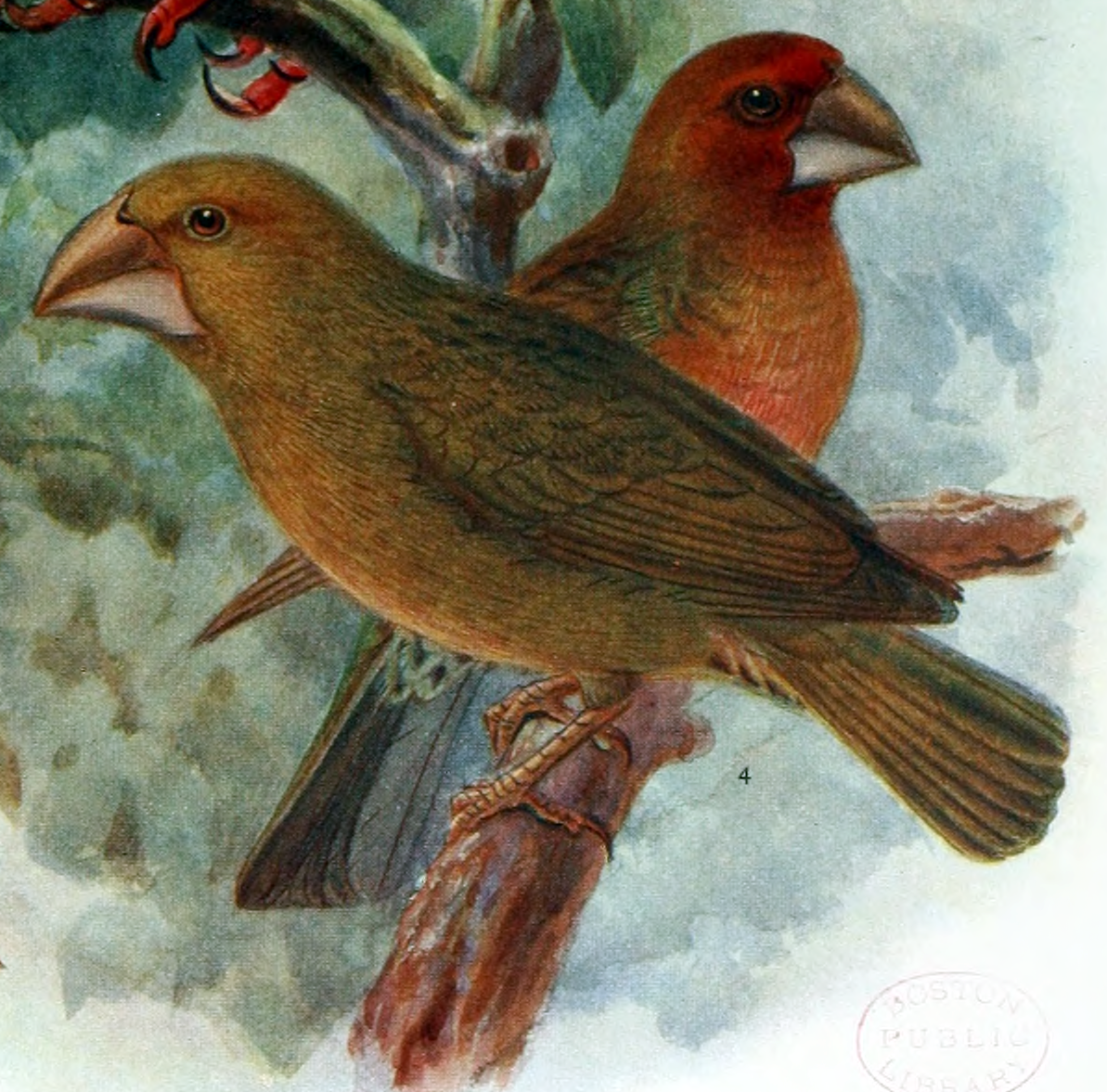
The now extinct Bonin grosbeak was placed in a new genus in Charles Bonaparte's 1850 monograph Conspectus Generum Avium

Birds

Birds described in 1850 include bee hummingbird, Wilson's bird-of-paradise, blue swallow, blue-shouldered robin-chat, Bornean banded pitta, Cape white-eye, grey-collared oriole, long-billed crow, purple-bearded bee-eater, Shoebill

- Extinction of the spectacled cormorant
- Edward Smith-Stanley obtains a grey trembler specimen from the bird collector Jules Verreaux

People

- Death of Henri Marie Ducrotay de Blainville

Publications

- Charles Lucien Bonaparte publishes Conspectus Generum Avium (Leyden); Revue critique de l'ornithologie Européenne (Brussels) and Monographie des loxiens (crossbills, grosbeaks, and allied species) (Leyden)
- John Gould commences The Birds of Asia (1850–83)
- Francis Orpen Morris begins A History of British Birds (1850–1857)
- Frédéric de Lafresnaye 1850. Essai d'une monographie du genre Picule (Buffon), Dendrocolaptes (Hermann, Illiger), devenu aujourd'hui la sous-famille Dendrocolaptinæ (Gray, Genera of birds), de la famille de Certhiadæ de Swains. Revue et Magasin de Zoologie Pure et Appliquée online BHL

Ongoing events

- Fauna Japonica

Institutions

- Deutsche Ornithologen-Gesellschaft founded
- The Berlin Museum has a total of 13,760 bird specimens
