= Müllerberget =

Mountain in Svalbard, Norway

Coordinates: 77.6626°N 21.5418°E

Müllerberget is a mountain in Edgeøya, Svalbard. It has a height of 534 m.a.s.l., and is the highest bare summit of Edgeøya (while the Kvalpyntfonna glacier reaches higher). The mountain is named after German zoologist Johann Wilhelm von Müller.
