= Kvalpyntfonna =

Glacier in Svalbard, Norway

- Location within Svalbard
- Location: Edgeøya, Svalbard
- Coordinates: 77°33′12″N 21°20′02″E

Kvalpyntfonna (Whale Point Glacier) is a glacier at Edgeøya, Svalbard. It covers a mountain area northeast of Kvalpynten. Its summit at 551 m.a.s.l. is the highest point on Edgeøya (while the Müllerberget mountain is the highest bare summit).

== See also ==
- List of glaciers in Svalbard
