= 1852 in birding and ornithology =

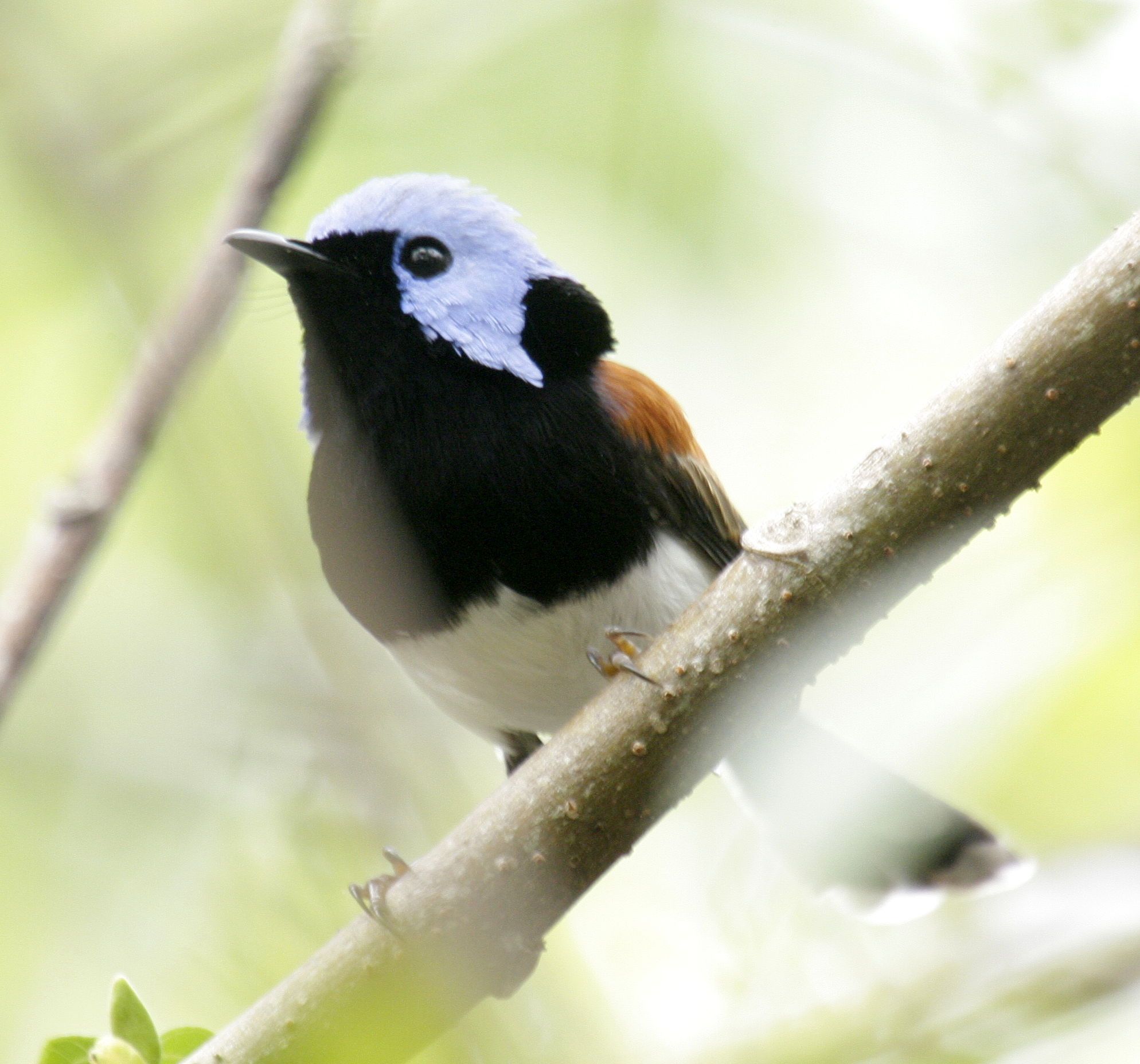
The lovely fairywren, first described by John Gould in 1852

- Death of William Thompson, a pioneer of ornithology in Ireland.
- Death of Louis François Auguste Souleyet, a prominent malacologist and the namesake for the streak-headed woodcreeper.
- Paul Gervais describes the Eocene bird genus Ludiortyx
- Sulawesi pygmy woodpecker described by Alfred Malherbe
- Death of Grigori Ivanovitch Langsdorff
- August Carl Eduard Baldamus, Christian Ludwig Brehm, Johann Wilhelm von Müller and Johann Friedrich Naumann publish Verzeichnis der Vögel Europa's. als Tausch-Catalog eingerichtet in Stuttgart. In this year also Müller began work on the illustrated book Beiträge zur Ornithologie Afrikas (1853–1870),

Ongoing events

- John Gould The birds of Australia; Supplement 1851–69. 1 vol. 81 plates; Artists: J. Gould and H. C. Richter; Lithographer: H. C. Richter
- John Gould The birds of Asia; 1850-83 7 vols. 530 plates, Artists: J. Gould, H. C. Richter, W. Hart and J. Wolf; Lithographers:H. C. Richter and W. Hart
