= 1854 in birding and ornithology =

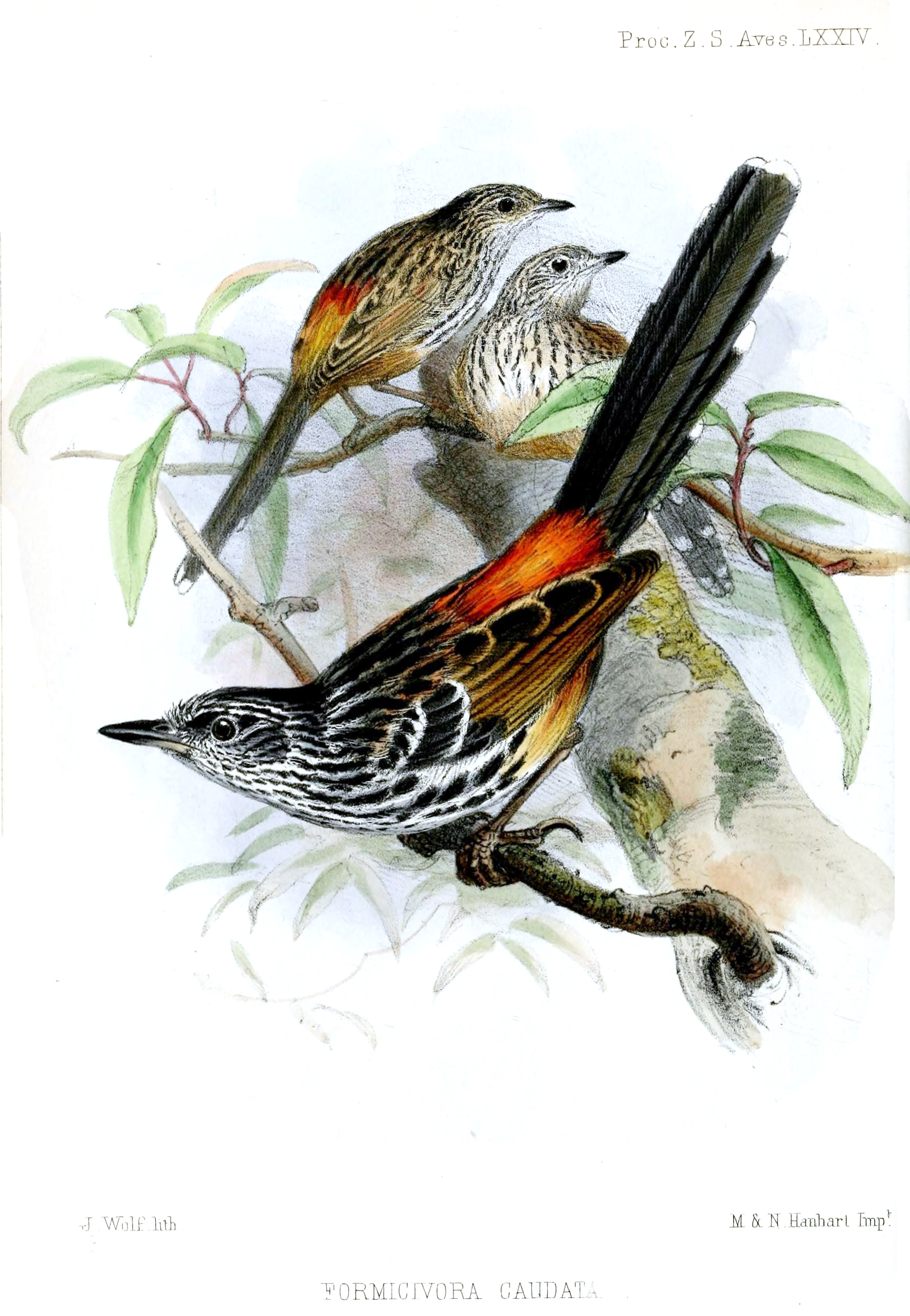
Illustration of Long-tailed antbird published in Proceedings of the Zoological Society of London 1854

- Orders Gruiformes and Ciconiiformes established.
- Adolphe Delattre and Johann Friedrich Naumann die in this year.
- Italian bird collector Matteo Botteri travels to Mexico.
- Réunion ibis described by Edmond de Sélys Longchamps.Other birds described in 1854 include fire-capped tit, thick-billed spiderhunter, cinnamon woodpecker, brown-breasted barbet, black-streaked puffbird, Hornby's storm petrel.
- Edgar Leopold Layard travels to Cape Colony.
- Jean-Baptiste Bailly publishes Ornithologie de la Savoie.
