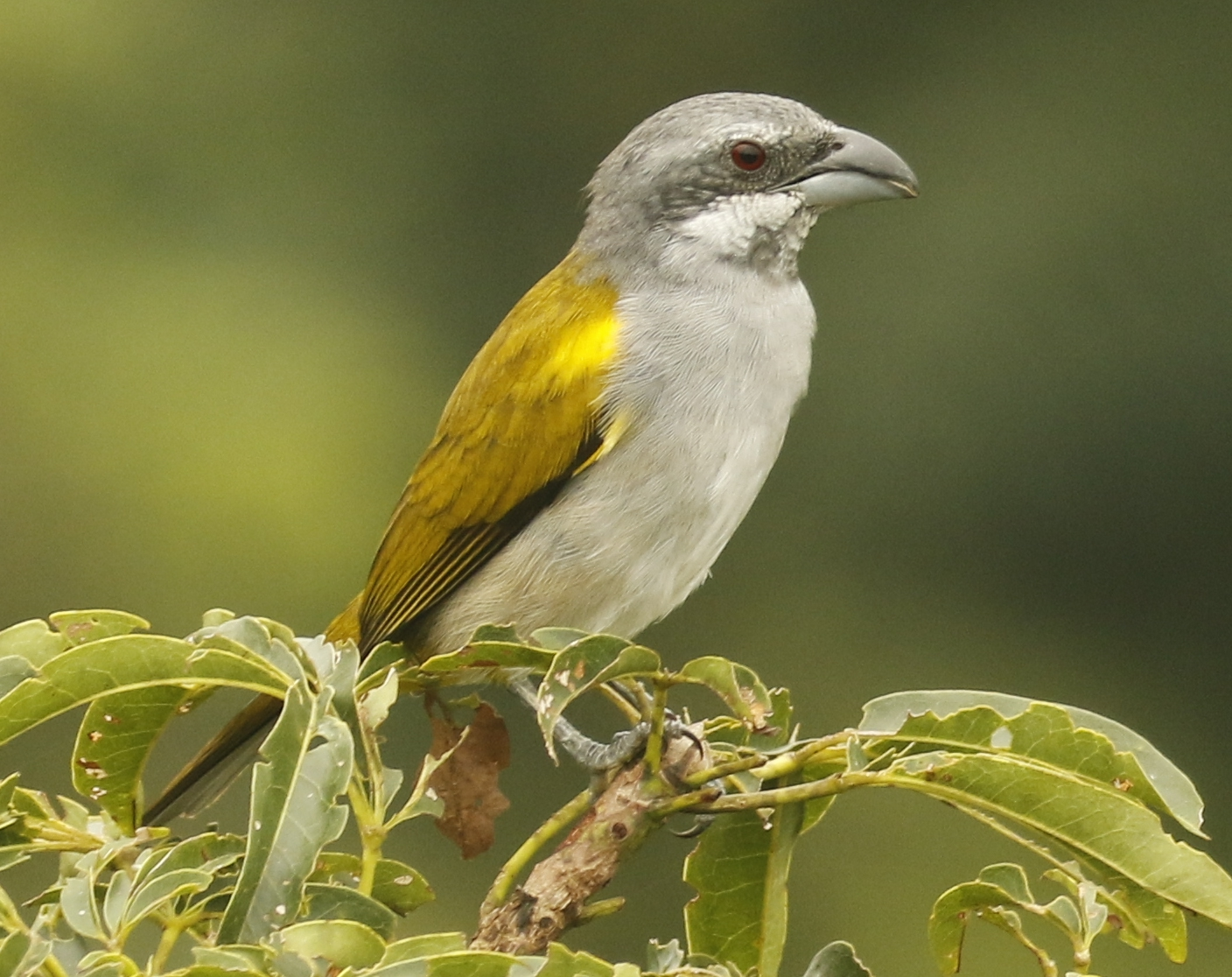
- In Yasuni National Park, Ecuador

Conservation status
- Least Concern (IUCN 3.1)

Scientific classification
- Kingdom: Animalia
- Phylum: Chordata
- Class: Aves
- Order: Passeriformes
- Family: Thraupidae
- Genus: Parkerthraustes; Remsen, 1997
- Species: P. humeralis

Binomial name
- Parkerthraustes humeralis (Lawrence, 1867)

Synonyms
- See text

= Yellow-shouldered grosbeak =

Species of bird

The yellow-shouldered grosbeak (Parkerthraustes humeralis) is a species of bird in the family Thraupidae, the tanagers and allies. It is found in Bolivia, Brazil, Colombia, Ecuador, and Peru.

== Taxonomy and systematics ==
The yellow-shouldered grosbeak was formally described in 1867 by the American amateur ornithologist George Newbold Lawrence. He coined the Latin name Pytilus (Caryothraustes) humeralis. Following information from molecular genetics the species was moved from genus Caryothrautes (Note: The name combines karuon "nut" and thraustēs "crusher") to its own genus Parkerthraustes in 1997 by James Van Remsen Jr., to honor the late ornithologist Theodore A. Parker III. The specific epithet humeralis is Late Latin, meaning "of the shoulders".

The yellow-shouldered grosbeak was long considered a member of the cardinal family Cardinalidae. It was moved to the tanager family based on the results of a molecular phylogenetic study published in 2007. It shares the subfamily Orchesticinae with the brown tanager (Orchesticus abeillei).

The yellow-shouldered grosbeak is the only member of its genus and has no subspecies.

== Description ==
The yellow-shouldered grosbeak is 16 to 16.5 cm (6.3 to 6.5 in) long; three individuals weighed 31 to 37 g (1.1 to 1.3 oz). It has a somewhat less massive bill than other grosbeaks. The sexes have the same plumage. Adults have a slate gray crown and nape and a wide black mask from the lores onto the ear coverts. Their upperparts are mostly olive-green with yellow secondary wing coverts that give it its English name. Its throat is white with black scaling or barring. Its breast and belly are gray and its vent and undertail coverts yellow. It has a red iris, a black maxilla, a gray mandible, and gray legs and feet.

== Distribution and habitat ==
The yellow-shouldered grosbeak is a bird of the western and southern Amazon Basin. In the west its range extends from Putumayo Department in southwestern Colombia south through eastern Ecuador and eastern Peru into Bolivia as far as Cochabamba Department. From Peru its range extends eastward across Brazil south of the Amazon through Pará almost to Tocantins. It inhabits humid terra firme forest, where it mostly is found in the canopy. In elevation it is found below 300 m (1,000 ft) in Colombia, mostly below 600 m (2,000 ft) in Ecuador, below 750 m (2,500 ft) in Peru, and between 200 and 1,000 m (700 and 3,300 ft) in Brazil.

== Behavior ==
=== Movement ===
The yellow-shouldered grosbeak is a year-round resident.

=== Feeding ===
The yellow-shouldered grosbeak's diet has not been studied but is known to include insects, seeds, and flowers. It usually forages in pairs high in the canopy as members of a mixed-species feeding flock. It takes most insect food by gleaning from foliage.

=== Breeding ===
Nothing is known about the yellow-shouldered grosbeak's breeding biology.

=== Vocalization ===
The yellow-shouldered grosbeak's song, which is rarely heard, is "a repetitive high, lisping seet tseer-tseer". Its most common call is "a distinctive, high, lisping tsuit-wsst". Another call is an "extremely high, thin feetjuh".

== Status ==
The IUCN has assessed the yellow-shouldered grosbeak as being of Least Concern. It has a very large range; its population size is not known and is believed to be decreasing. No immediate threats have been identified. It is considered "local and uncommon" in its small Colombian range, "rare to locally uncommon" in Ecuador, "rare but widespread" in Peru, and "uncommon to rare" in Brazil. "Human activity has little direct effect on the Yellow-shouldered Grosbeak, other than the local effects of habitat destruction."
