= 1868 in birding and ornithology =

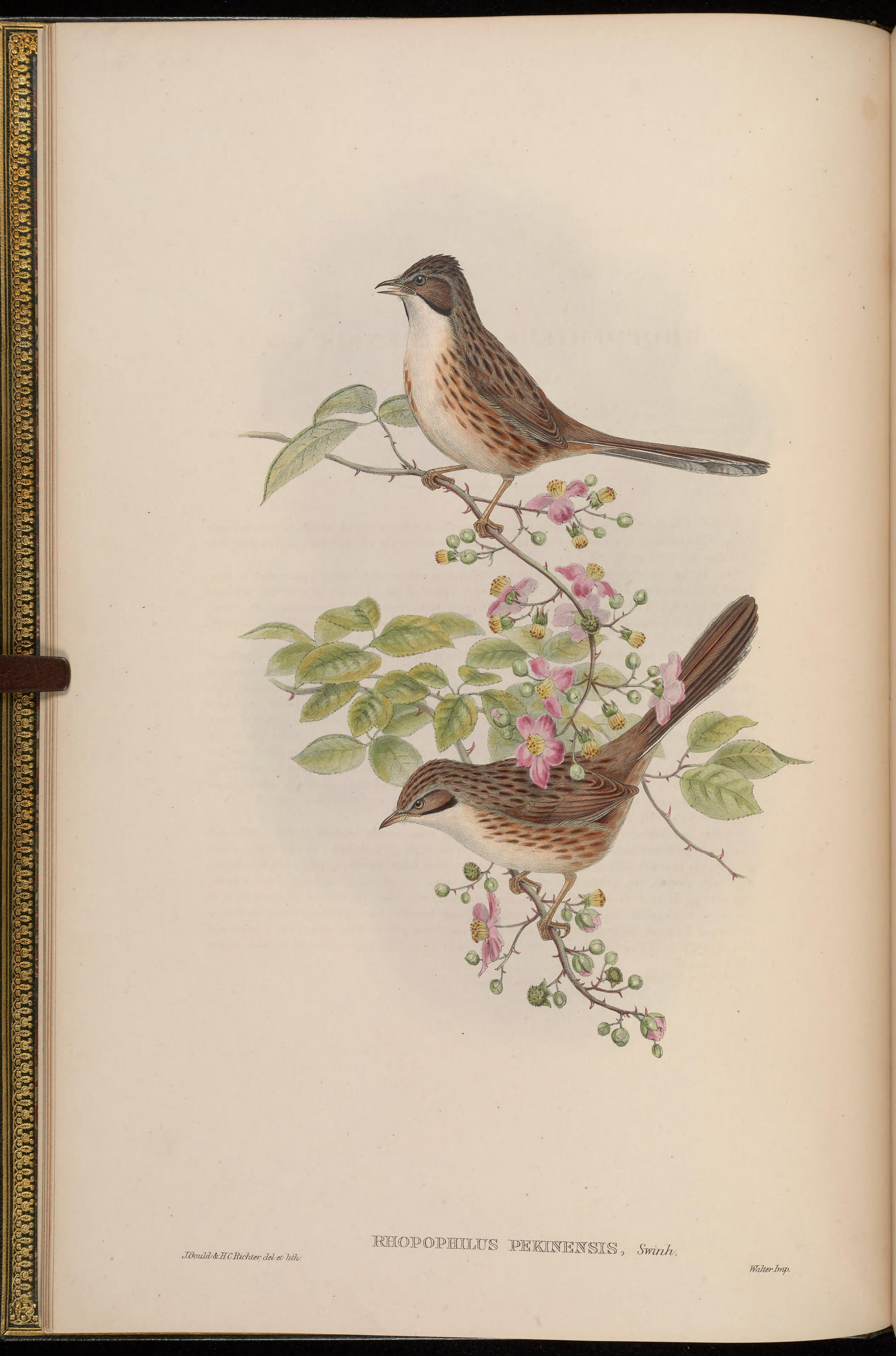
Beijing babbler in Gould Birds of Asia

- Birds described in 1868 include Antillean siskin, Yap monarch, saffron-crested tyrant-manakin, chestnut-headed crake,
- Alfred Newton proposes protection for seabirds
- Death of Magnus von Wright.
- August von Pelzeln publishes volume 1 of Zur Ornithologie Brasiliens; Resultate von Johann Natterers Reisen in den Jahren 1817 bis 1835.Wien, A. Pichler's Witwe & Sohne, 1868–70.
- Édouard Verreaux Catalogue des Oiseaux disponibles dans la maison d'E. Verreaux, 1868 – Catalog of birds found in the house of E. Verreaux
- Bernard Altum Der Vogel und sein Leben, Münster 1868 (Birds and their lives); published in several editions, 7th edition 1903.

Expeditions

- 1865–1868 Magenta circumnavigation of the globe Italian expedition that made important scientific observations in South America.

Ongoing events

- John Gould The birds of Australia Supplement 1851–69. 1 vol. 81 plates; Artists: J. Gould and H. C. Richter; Lithographer: H. C. Richter
- John Gould The birds of Asia 1850-83 7 vols. 530 plates, Artists: J. Gould, H. C. Richter, W. Hart and J. Wolf; Lithographers:H. C. Richter and W. Hart
- The Ibis
