= 1851 in birding and ornithology =

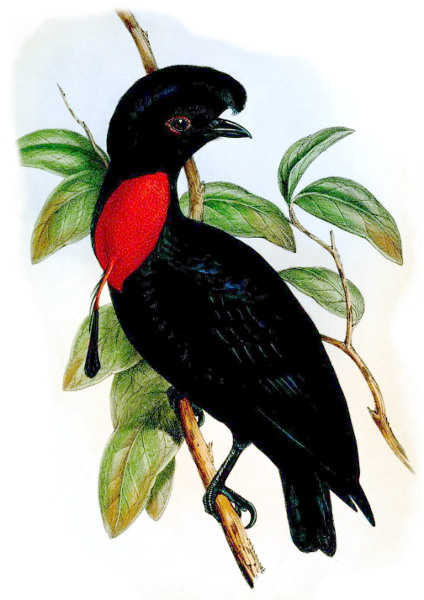
Bare-necked umbrellabird, a rainforest species from Central America first described in 1851

== People ==
- 27 January – Death of John James Audubon, French-American ornithologist, naturalist and painter who produced the monumental Birds of America
- 5 July – Birth of William Brewster, American ornithologist and cofounder of the American Ornithologists' Union

== Books ==
- Emmanuel Le Maout Les Mammifères et les Oiseaux (1851–1854, 2 vol. gr. in-8, illustrés. Showy work for the publishers stand at Exposition Universelle in 1855
- Jacques Pucheran, 1851 Catalogue méthodique de la collection des mammifères de la collection des oiseaux et des collections annexes Paris Gide et Baud online Gallica
- Edward Vernon Harcourt A Sketch of Madeira London, John Murray,1851. online BHL

== Birds ==
Birds described in 1851 include the bare-necked umbrellabird, common ʻamakihi, dusky-headed parakeet, Madeira firecrest, Madeiran storm petrel, North Island brown kiwi, olive sparrow, grey-crowned palm-tanager, red-headed fody, rufous-throated tanager, silver-throated tanager, Sri Lanka bush warbler, yellow-bellied tanager and yellow-eared bulbul.

The last Norfolk kākā died in captivity in London.

Isidore Geoffroy Saint-Hilaire describes the Elephant bird.

== Institutions ==
- K.k. Naturhistorisches Hofmuseum in Vienna extensively reorganized.

Ongoing events

- John Gould The birds of Australia; Supplement 1851–69. 1 vol. 81 plates; Artists: J. Gould and H. C. Richter; Lithographer: H. C. Richter
- John Gould The birds of Asia; 1850-83 7 vols. 530 plates, Artists: J. Gould, H. C. Richter, W. Hart and J. Wolf; Lithographers:H. C. Richter and W. Hart
