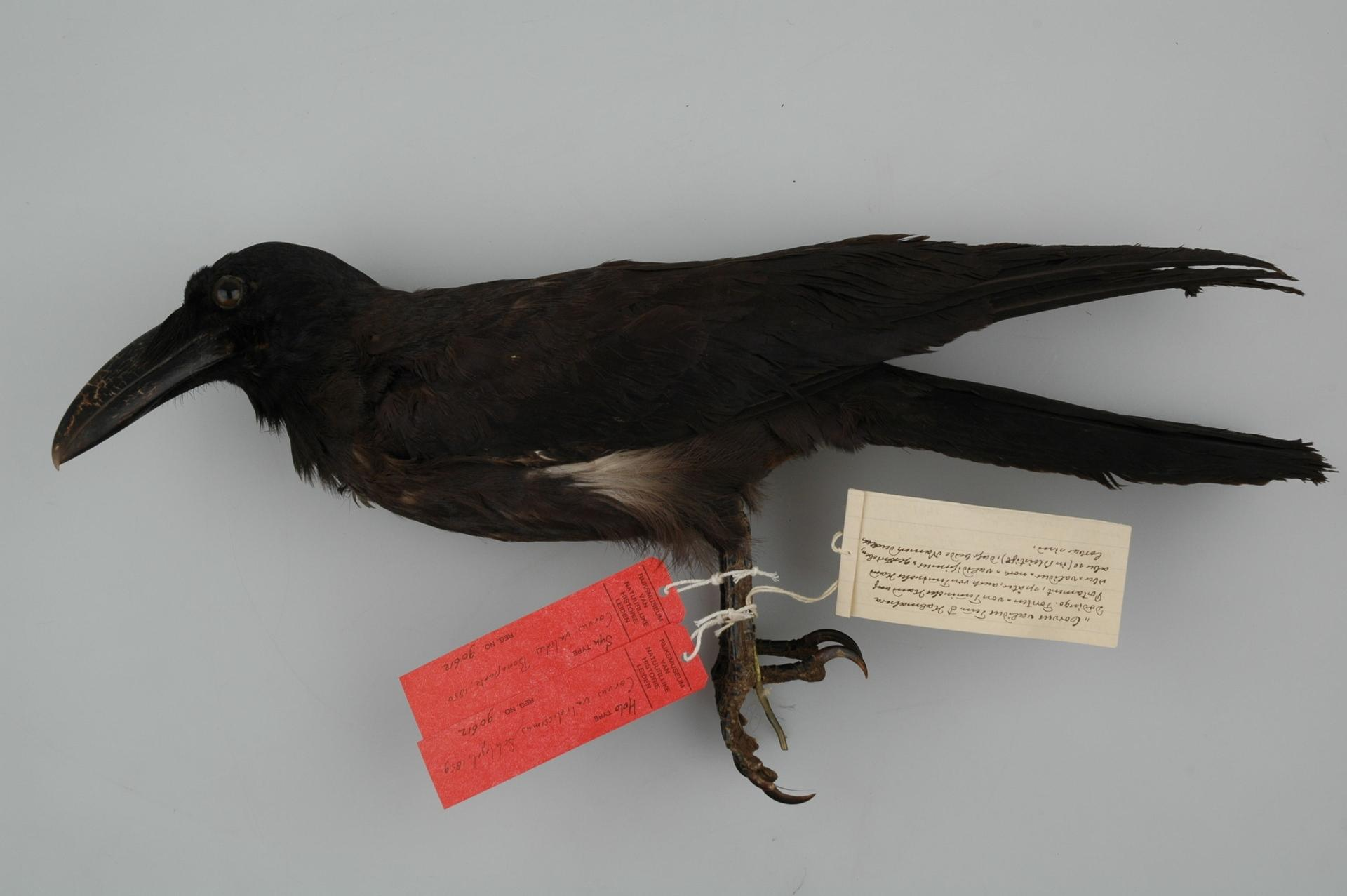
- Preserved specimen from the Naturalis Biodiversity Center, Netherlands
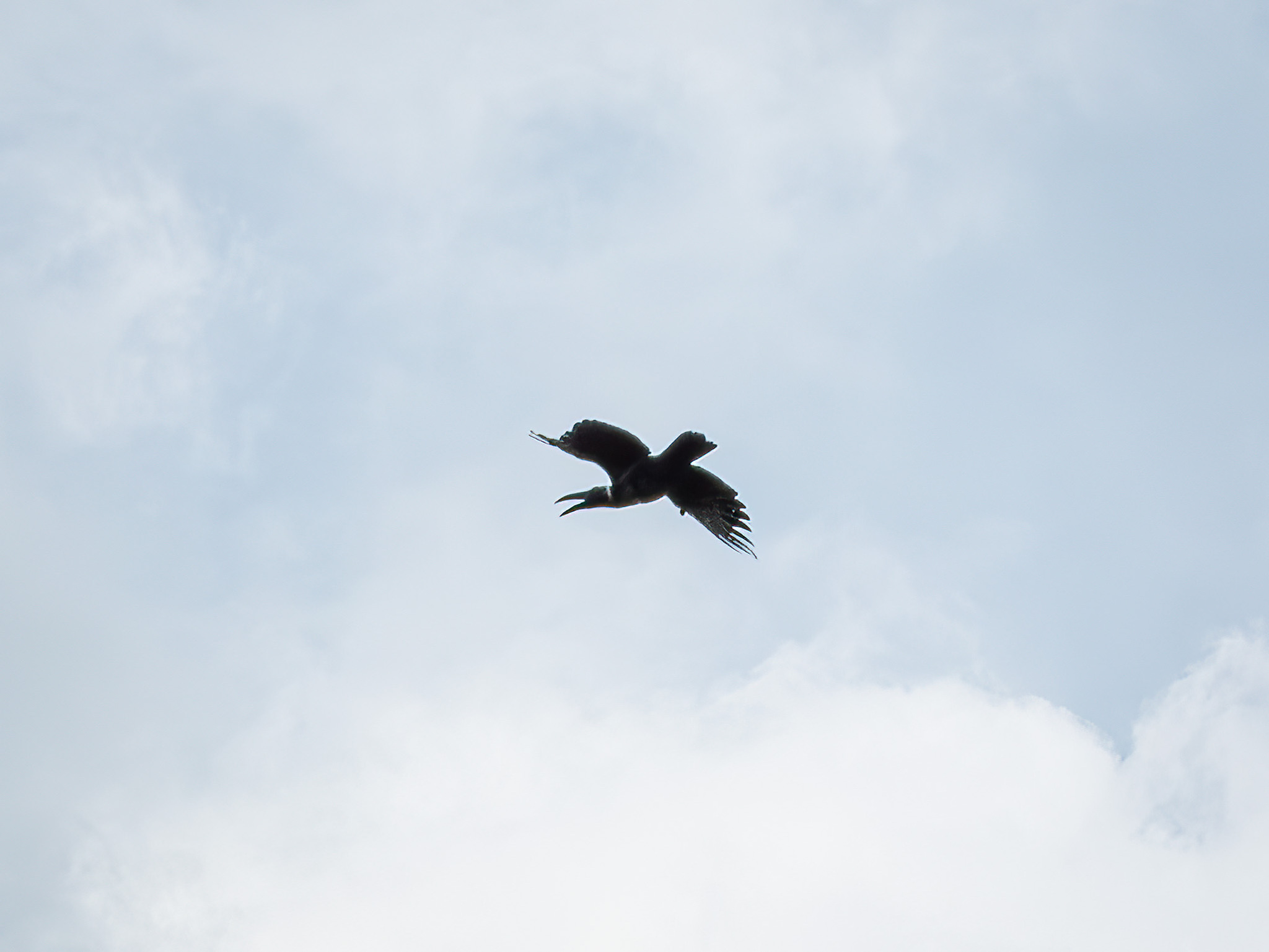

Conservation status
- Least Concern (IUCN 3.1)

Scientific classification
- Kingdom: Animalia
- Phylum: Chordata
- Class: Aves
- Order: Passeriformes
- Family: Corvidae
- Genus: Corvus
- Species: C. validus

Binomial name
- Corvus validus Bonaparte, 1850

= Long-billed crow =

Species of bird

Long-billed Crow, Halmahera

The long-billed crow (Corvus validus) is a crow that is endemic to the Northern Maluku Islands. This crow is large with glossy plumage, a large bill and white irises. It is classified by the International Union for Conservation of Nature as a "near-threatened species".

== Description ==
The long-billed crow is a large crow growing from 45 to 53 cm (18 to 21 in) in length including its relatively short tail. The large bill tapers from a broad base and is black, as are the legs and feet. In adults, the plumage is glossy and entirely black; juveniles have dull black plumage. The iris is dark grey on juveniles, turning to pale blue to white in adults. The call of this crow has been likened to the yapping of a puppy "cruk ... cruk ... cruk".

The long-billed crow can be differentiated from other crows by its large size and glossy plumage, its long beak and its white iris. The only other crow within its range is the Torresian crow (Corvus orru) which has a much smaller beak and inhabits more open areas rather than forests.

== Distribution and habitat ==
The long-billed crow is endemic to the Maluku Islands, an archipelago within Indonesia. It is a forest-dwelling bird and is mainly found on the islands of Morotai, Kayoa, Kasiruta, Bacan and Halmahera.

== Status ==
The long-billed crow has a restricted range with a total area of occupancy of about 25,700 km^{2} (9,900 mi^{2}). The forests in which it lives are being degraded and the population of the crow is estimated to be declining. However, it is a common bird and although it favours primary forest, it seems able to adapt to a certain extent to secondary forests, partly logged areas, coconut plantations and cultivated areas. The International Union for Conservation of Nature, for a long period of time, rated its conservation status as being of "least concern". On 2014 IUCN changed the status to "near threatened" because populations seemed to be declining more rapidly than was previously thought, but re-assigned it as least concern on 2024.
