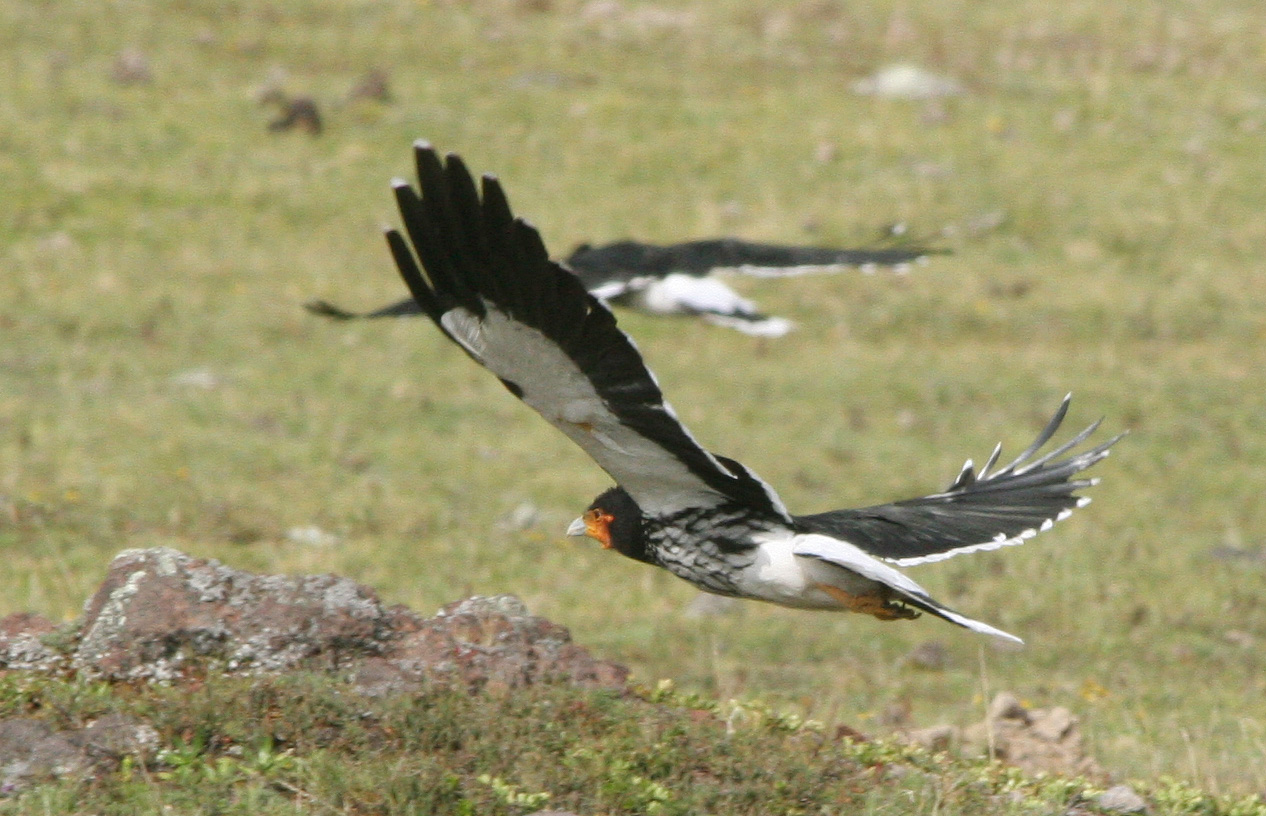

Conservation status
- Least Concern (IUCN 3.1)

Scientific classification
- Kingdom: Animalia
- Phylum: Chordata
- Class: Aves
- Order: Falconiformes
- Family: Falconidae
- Genus: Daptrius
- Species: D. carunculatus

Binomial name
- Daptrius carunculatus (Des Murs, 1853)

Synonyms
- Polyborus carunculatus Des Murs, 1853; Milvago megalopterus Sclater, 1858; Milvago carunculatus Sclater, 1860; Daptius carunculatus

= Carunculated caracara =

Species of bird

The carunculated caracara (Daptrius carunculatus) is a species of bird of prey in the family Falconidae, the falcons and caracaras. It is found in Colombia and Ecuador.

== Taxonomy and systematics ==
The carunculated caracara was formally described in 1853 as Phalcoboenus carunculatus by the French naturalist Marc Œillet des Murs based on a specimen collected in Colombia. A more detailed unpublished description by des Murs dating from 1845 was published in an article by Philip Sclater in 1861. The carunculated caracara is monotypic: no subspecies are recognised.

The carunculated caracara was formerly placed in the genus Phalcoboenus. Molecular genetic studies found that the genus Milvago was polyphyletic with the chimango caracara sister to the genus Phalcoboenus and the yellow-headed caracara sister to the genus Daptrius. As the genetic divergence was relatively shallow, the polyphyly was resolved by expanding the genus Daptrius to include the species formerly placed in the genera Milvago and Phalcoboenus.

== Description ==
The carunculated caracara is 50 to 56 cm (20 to 22 in) long with a wingspan of 112 to 119 cm (44 to 47 in). The sexes' plumages are alike. Adults are mostly glossy black with a bold pattern of white streaks on their breast. Their lower belly, undertail coverts, underside of the wing, and tips of the flight and tail feathers are pure unmarked white. Their cere and the bare skin on their face and throat are bright orange to deep red, and wrinkles ("caruncles") in the throat skin give the species its English name and specific epithet. Their iris is hazel to blackish gray and their legs and feet bright yellow. Juveniles are tawny to dark brown with some white mottling on the head, rump, and underparts. Their legs and feet are dusky.

== Distribution and habitat ==
The carunculated caracara is found in the Andes from southwestern Colombia to southern Ecuador. It inhabits the temperate zone above treeline, where the landscape is páramo or grassy pastures with scattered bushes. In elevation it mostly ranges between 3,000 and 4,000 m (9,800 and 13,100 ft) but has been recorded as high as 4,700 m (15,400 ft).

== Behavior ==
=== Movement ===
As far as is known the carunculated caracara is a year-round resident, but is somewhat nomadic within its range, gathering in flocks that may number more than 100 outside the breeding season.

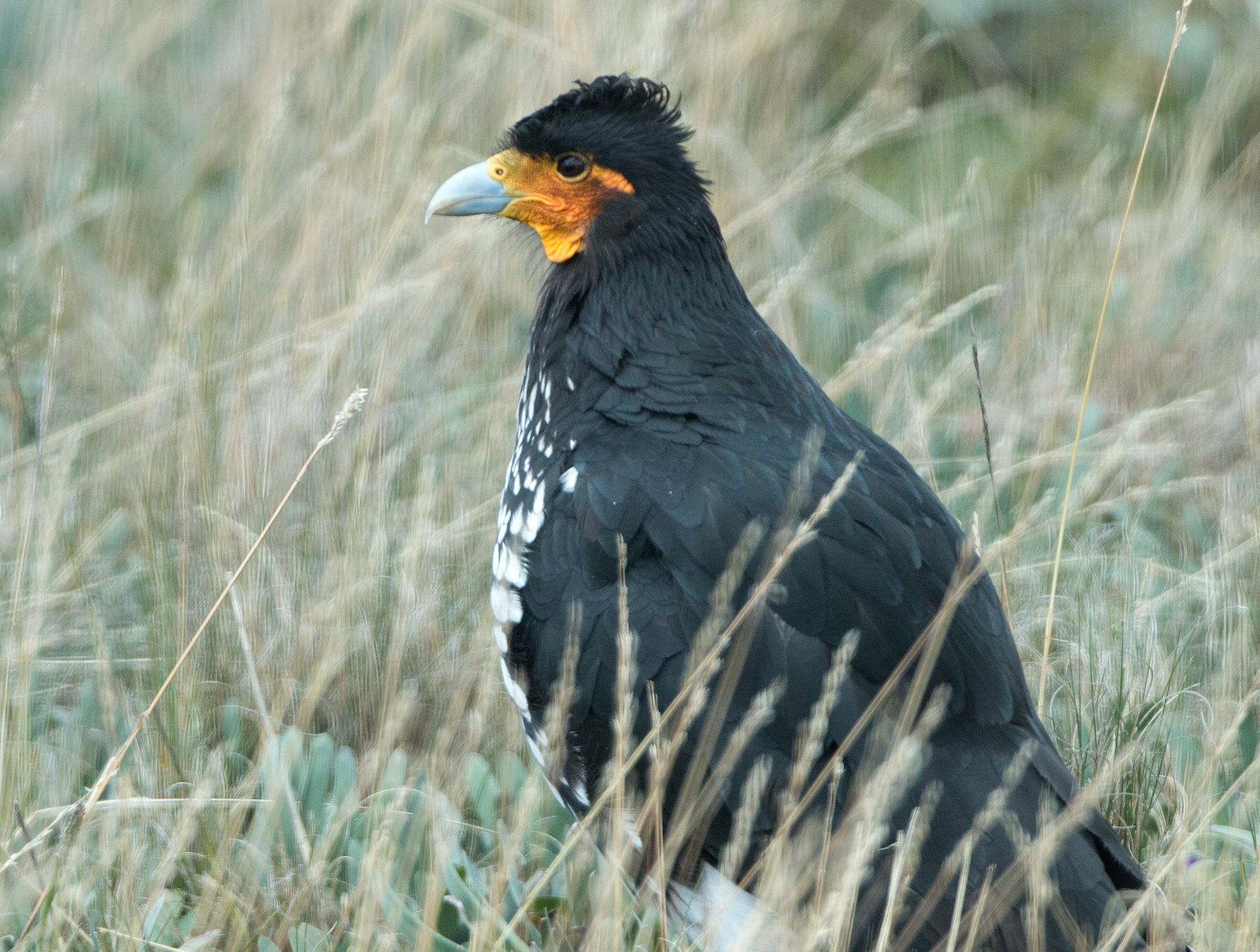
At Antisana Ecological Reserve, Ecuador

=== Feeding ===
The carunculated caracara is omnivorous and highly opportunistic. Its diet includes worms, insects and their larvae, other invertebrates, amphibians, small lizards and mammals, nestling birds, carrion, and vegetable matter like grain. It usually forages by walking or running on the ground but will do so in low-level flight. In often feeds in small groups among cattle or llamas.

=== Breeding ===
The carunculated caracara usually lays eggs during September and October, though there are records from later. It usually builds a stick nest on a cliff ledge but one has been recorded in a tree. The clutch size usually is two eggs. The incubation period, time to fledging, and details of parental care are not known.

=== Vocalization ===
As of early 2023, the Cornell Lab of Ornithology's Macaulay Library had only one recording of carunculated caracara flight calls. Xeno-canto had it and two other recordings. One is "grating and squealing barks" and the other a "long series of harsh notes".

== Status ==
The IUCN has assessed the carunculated caracara as being of Least Concern. Though it has a restricted range and an estimated population of fewer than 6700 mature individuals, the latter is believed to be stable. No immediate threats have been identified. It is considered uncommon to locally common and "relatively secure at present, given that [its] habitat [is] not under significant pressure".
