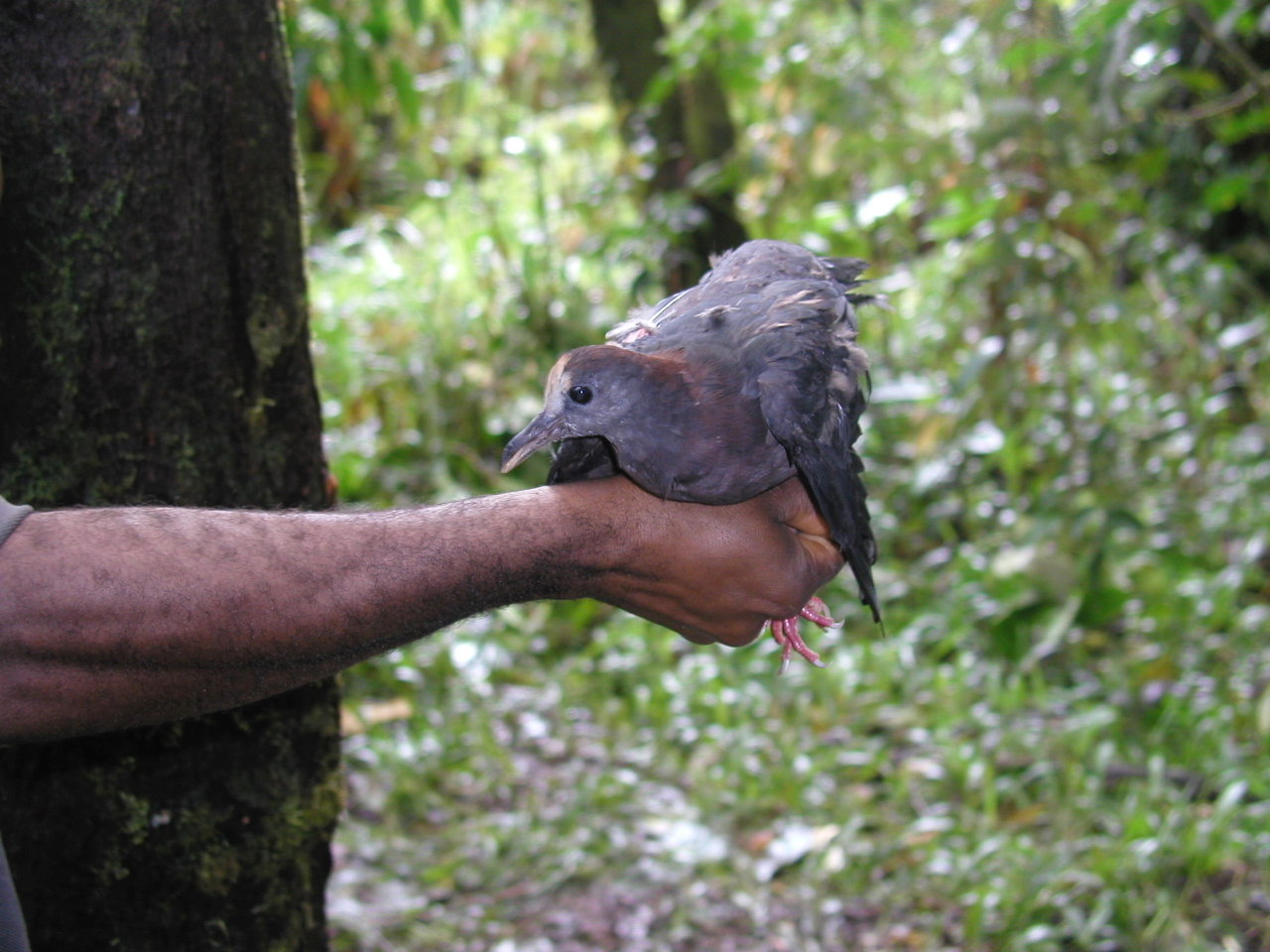

Conservation status
- Least Concern (IUCN 3.1)

Scientific classification
- Kingdom: Animalia
- Phylum: Chordata
- Class: Aves
- Order: Columbiformes
- Family: Columbidae
- Genus: Henicophaps
- Species: H. albifrons

Binomial name
- Henicophaps albifrons Gray, 1862

= New Guinea bronzewing =

Species of bird

The New Guinea bronzewing (Henicophaps albifrons) is a species of bird in the pigeon and dove family Columbidae. It is found in New Guinea. Its natural habitats are subtropical or tropical moist lowland forests and subtropical or tropical moist montane forests.

== Taxonomy and systematics ==
The New Guinea bronzewing was described and given the binomial name Henicophaps albifrons by the English zoologist George Robert Gray in 1862 from a specimen that had been collected by the naturalist Alfred Russel Wallace on the island of Waigeo, northwest New Guinea. The specific epithet combines the Latin albus meaning "white" and frons meaning "forehead" or "front".

Two subspecies are recognised:

- H. a. albifrons Gray, GR, 1862 – west Papuan islands, New Guinea, Yapen Island (off northwest New Guinea)
- H. a. schlegeli (von Rosenberg, HKB, 1866) – Aru Islands (southwest of New Guinea)
