= 1866 in birding and ornithology =

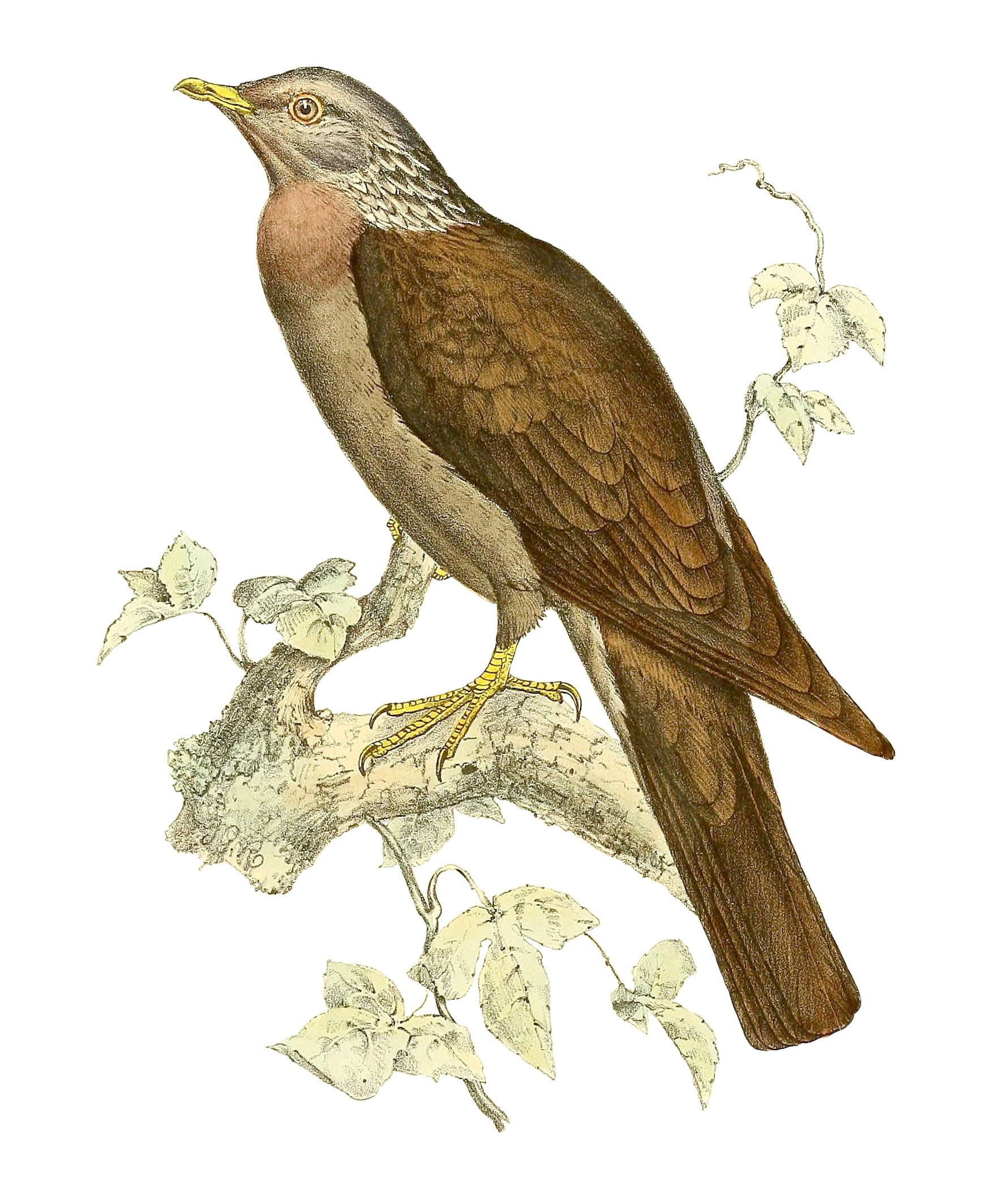
Comoros olive pigeon Illustration from Recherches sur la faune de Madagascar et de ses dépendances by François Pollen and Douwe Casparus van Dam

- Richard Owen describes the mandible of the broad-billed parrot.
- Philip Sclater Exotic Ornithology (1866–69).
- Carl Jakob Sundevall Conspectus avium picinarum, Stockholm [Sweden] :Samson & Wallin, 1866.[on woodpeckers] online BHL
- Birds described in 1866 include Cabanis's tanager, bar-winged rail, spot-crowned antvireo, Van Dam's vanga, Mayotte drongo,
- Death of Johann Wilhelm von Müller
- Death of Philipp Franz von Siebold
- Axel Wilhelm Eriksson leaves Sweden for South-West Africa.
- Foundation of Museu Paraense Emílio Goeldi.
- Death of Christian Ludwig Landbeck. He had described many bird species in collaboration with Rodolfo Amando Philippi.
- Death of Ferdinand Joseph L'Herminier
- Philippi, R. A. & Landbeck, L. 1866. Beiträge zur Fauna Chiles. Archiv für Naturgeschichte 32: 121–132.Masafuera rayadito.

== Expeditions ==
- 1865–1868 Magenta circumnavigation of the globe Italian expedition that made important scientific observations in South America.

== Ongoing events ==
- John Gould The birds of Australia; Supplement 1851–69. 1 vol. 81 plates; Artists: J. Gould and H. C. Richter; Lithographer: H. C. Richter
- John Gould The birds of Asia; 1850-83 7 vols. 530 plates, Artists: J. Gould, H. C. Richter, W. Hart and J. Wolf; Lithographers:H. C. Richter and W. Hart
- The Ibis
