= 1867 in birding and ornithology =

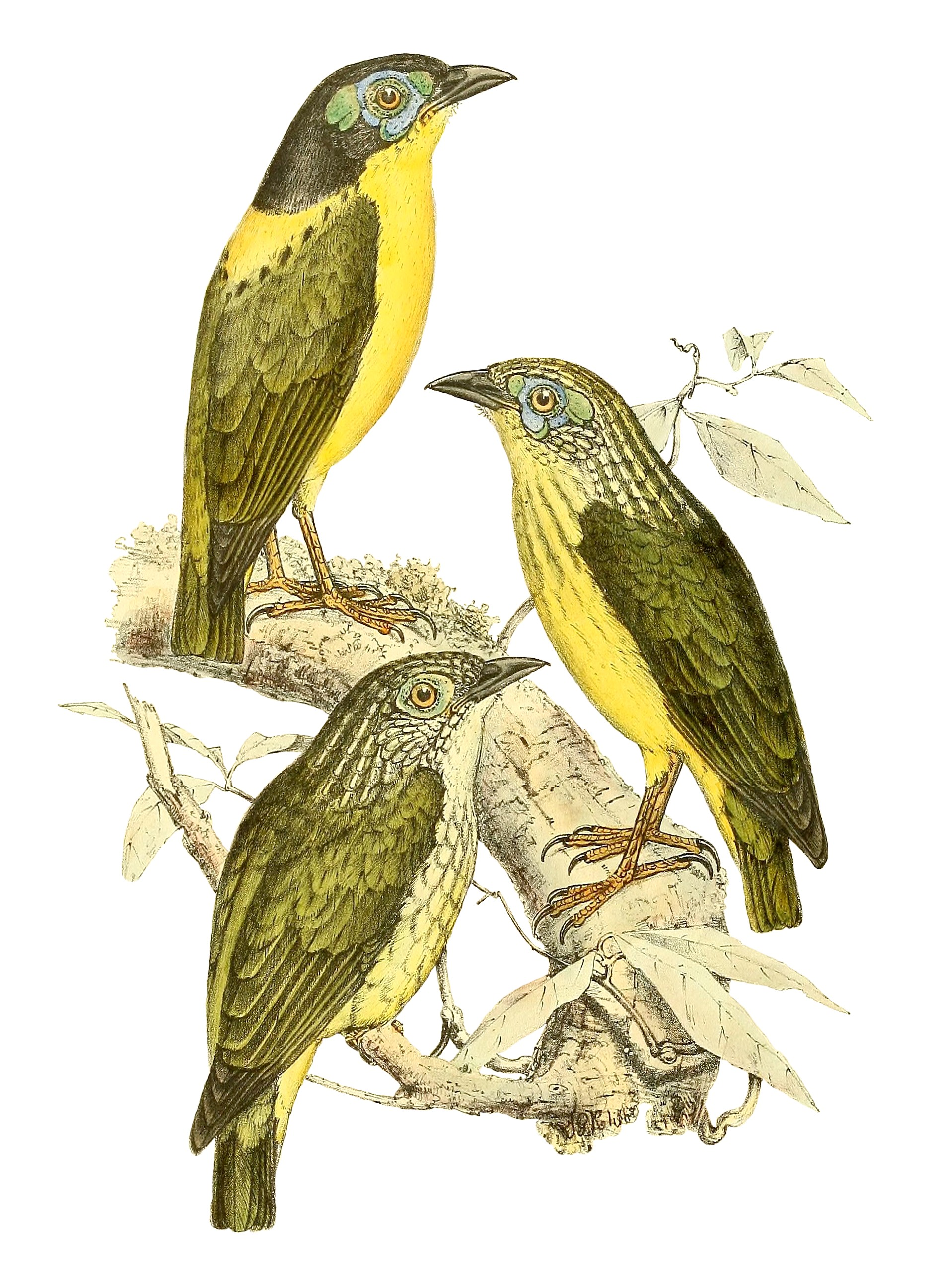
Schlegel's asity

- Birds described in 1867 include short-tailed finch, Mascarene coot (subfossil, Tongatapu rail (known only from brief descriptions of a specimen, now lost and a painting) Drakensberg rockjumper, Darwin's nothura, yellow-shouldered grosbeak, helmeted honeyeater, rufous scrubbird
- Death of Prince Maximilian of Wied-Neuwied
- Death of Prideaux John Selby
- Death of John MacGillivray
- Death of Filippo de Filippi
- Alphonse Milne-Edwards Recherches anatomiques et paléontologiques pour servir à l'histoire des oiseaux fossiles de la France.1867-71 Online at Gallica Bibliothèque nationale de France
- Foundation of Museo Civico di Storia Naturale di Genova

Expeditions

- 1865–1868 Magenta circumnavigation of the globe Italian expedition that made important scientific observations in South America.

Ongoing events

- John Gould The birds of Australia; Supplement 1851–69. 1 vol. 81 plates; Artists: J. Gould and H. C. Richter; Lithographer: H. C. Richter
- John Gould The birds of Asia; 1850-83 7 vols. 530 plates, Artists: J. Gould, H. C. Richter, W. Hart and J. Wolf; Lithographers:H. C. Richter and W. Hart
- The Ibis
