= Jean-Baptiste Bailly =

French ornithologist

Jean-Baptiste Bailly (23 August 1822, Chambéry – 20 December 1880 Chambéry) was a French ornithologist.

Bailly was one of the founders of the Société d’histoire naturelle de Savoie in 1844 and of the Museum of Natural History in Chambéry where he was the Conservator. In 1848 he was given permission by Charles Albert of Sardinia (1798–1849) to collect bird specimens in Savoy (then part of Italy) an authorization later renewed by Victor Emmanuel II of Italy (1820–1878). In 1853-1854 he published Ornithology of Savoy (Ornithologie de la Savoie ou histoire des oiseaux qui vivent en Savoie à l’état sauvage- four volumes published in Paris). This was supplemented in 1855-1856 by an atlas of 110 plates (published in Chambéry).
