= 1860 in birding and ornithology =

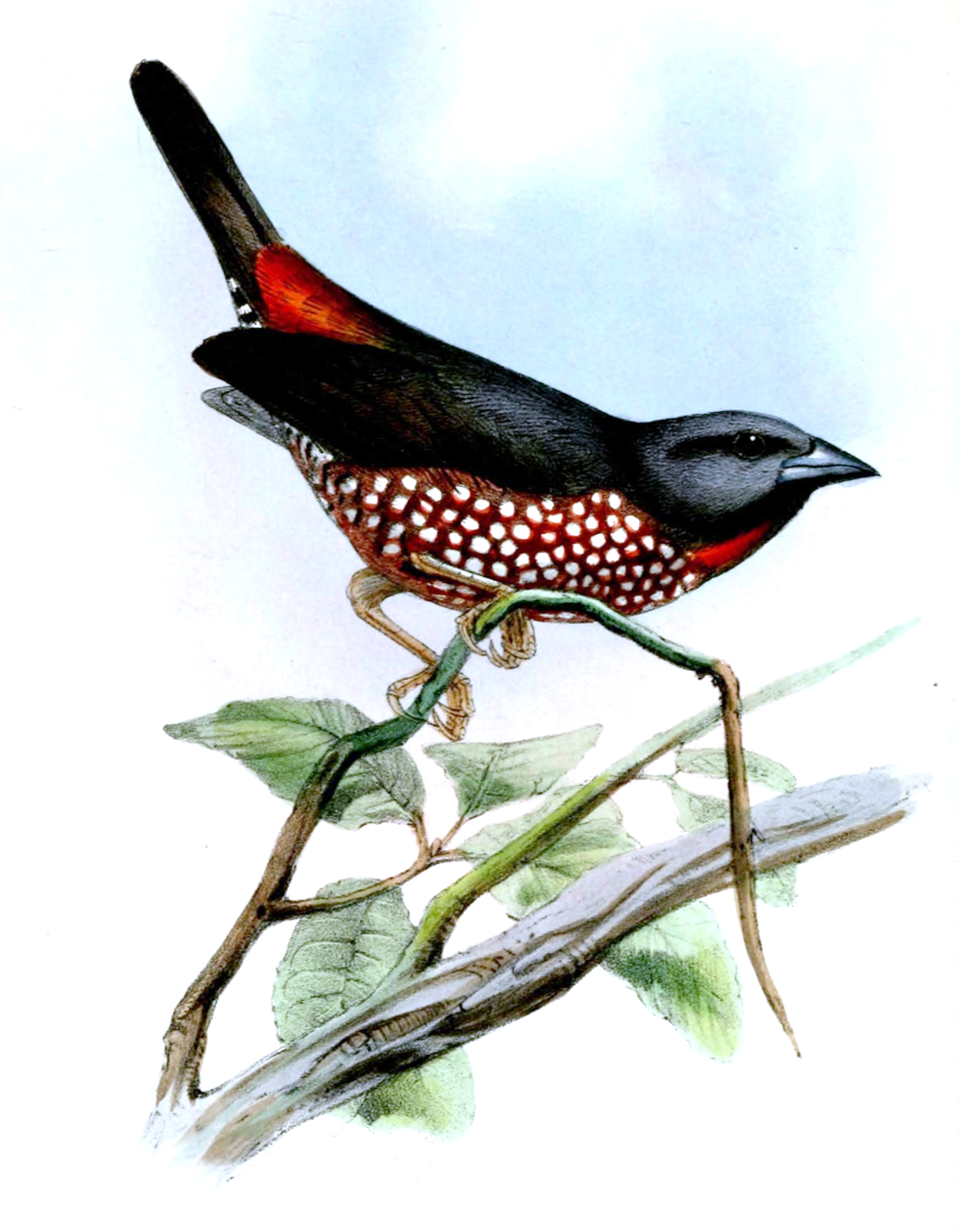
Brown twinspot Proceedings of the Zoological Society of London 1860

- Birds described in 1860 include glittering kingfisher, northern cassowary, white-throated whistler, Knysna warbler, orange-breasted fruiteater, snowy-throated kingbird, Ecuadorian piedtail, azure dollarbird,
- George Newbold Lawrence, Spencer Fullerton Baird and John Cassin, co-author Birds of North America
- Jacob Henry Studer begins studying the birds of Ohio.
- 1860 Oxford evolution debate
- Alfred Brehm undertakes an expedition to Norway and Lapland
- Johann Jakob von Tschudi publishes Reise durch die Andes von Südamerika

Expeditions

- 1857–1860 SMS Novara Ornithology directed by Johann Zelebor.

Ongoing events

- John Gould The birds of Australia; Supplement 1851–69. 1 vol. 81 plates; Artists: J. Gould and H. C. Richter; Lithographer: H. C. Richter
- John Gould The birds of Asia; 1850-83 7 vols. 530 plates, Artists: J. Gould, H. C. Richter, W. Hart and J. Wolf; Lithographers:H. C. Richter and W. Hart
- The Ibis
