= 1857 in birding and ornithology =

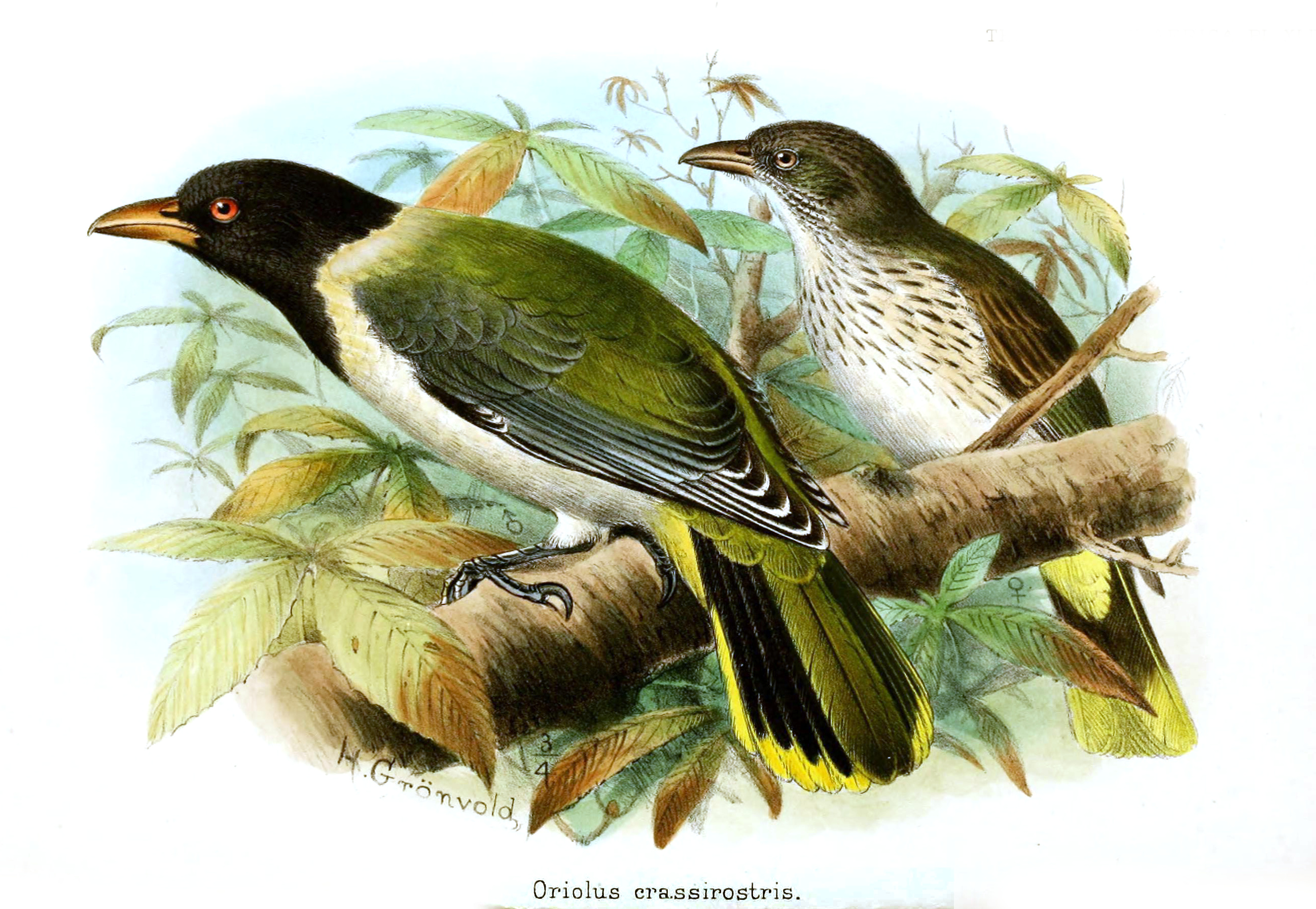
São Tomé oriole described in 1857

- Thomas Mayo Brewer publishes part of North American Oology
- Charles Lucien Bonaparte, a prominent authority on North American birds, dies.
- Martin Lichtenstein, who heavily contributed to the ornithological collection at the Berlin Zoological Museum, dies.
- August von Pelzeln becomes Curator of birds at Kaiserlichen Hof-Naturalien-Cabinet in Vienna.
- Birds described in 1857 include black-tailed gnatcatcher, bristlebill, dwarf cassowary, plumed guineafowl, square-tailed nightjar, Thekla lark
- Philip Sclater publishes A monograph of the birds forming the tanagrine genus Calliste
- Gustav Hartlaub publishes System der Ornithologie West Afrika's
- Charles de Souancé publishes Iconographie des perroquets, non figurés dans les publications de Levaillant et de M. Bourjot Saint-Hilaire, in collaboration with Charles Lucien Bonaparte and Émile Blanchard, Paris : P. Bertrand, 1857

Expeditions

- 1857–1860 SMS Novara Ornithology directed by Johann Zelebor.

Ongoing events

- John Gould The birds of Australia; Supplement 1851–69. 1 vol. 81 plates; Artists: J. Gould and H. C. Richter; Lithographer: H. C. Richter
- John Gould The birds of Asia; 1850-83 7 vols. 530 plates, Artists: J. Gould, H. C. Richter, W. Hart and J. Wolf; Lithographers:H. C. Richter and W. Hart
