= 1863 in birding and ornithology =

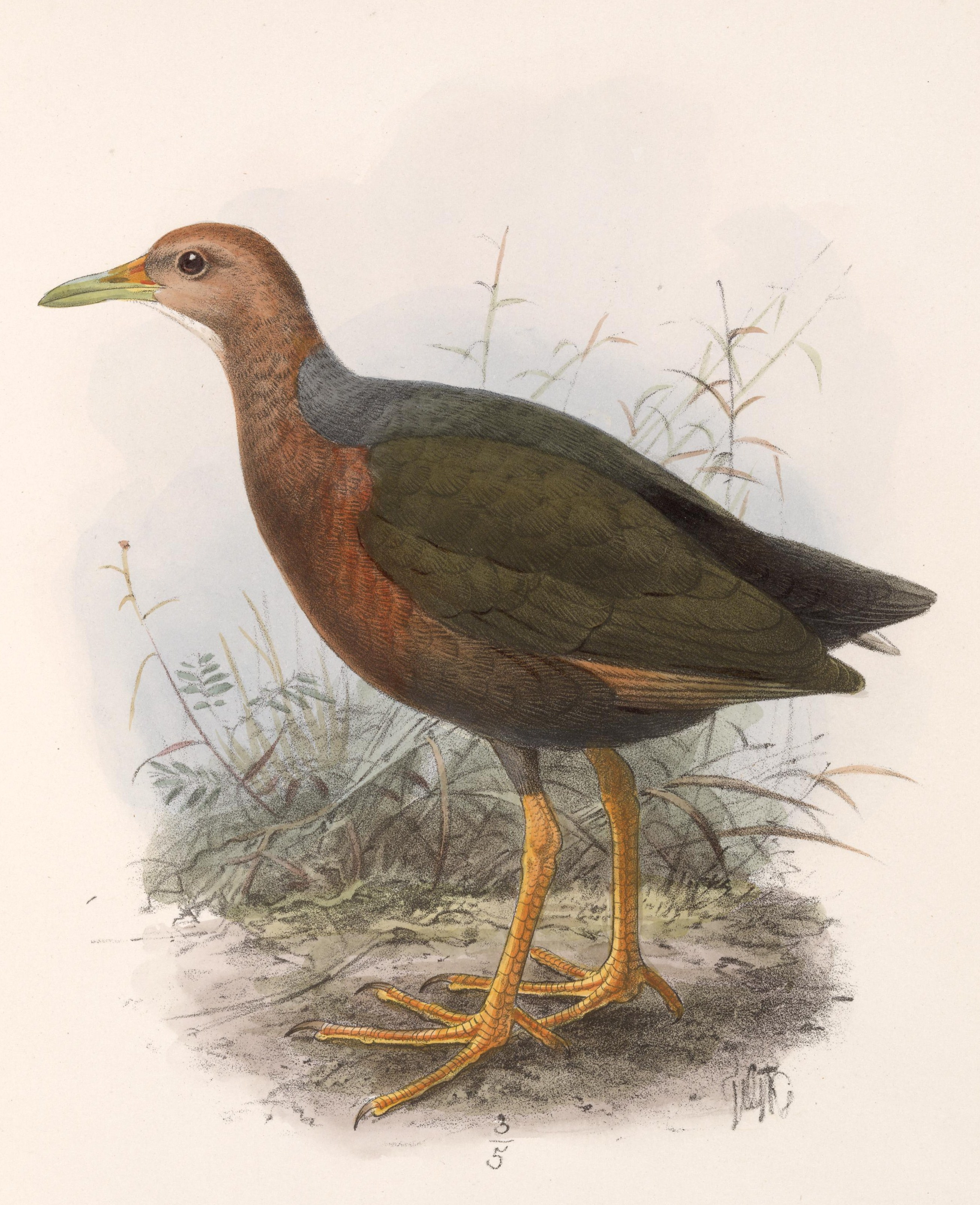
the rufous-necked wood rail was described in 1863

- Thomas Caverhill Jerdon publishes the first volume of The Birds of India.
- François Victor Massena, 3rd Duke of Rivoli, Alberto della Marmora and Alfred Moquin-Tandon die.
- American ornithologist Greene Smith founds the Greene Smith Museum
- Birds described in 1863 include black-throated munia, Amur falcon, Buru monarch, nuthatch vanga, red-tailed wheatear,
- Heinrich Agathon Bernstein discovers the Waigeo home of Wilson's bird-of-paradise.
- Alfred Russel Wallace publishes The Naturalist on the River Amazons
- Gustav Radde Reisen im Süden von Ost-Sibirien in den Jahren 1855-59 (Travels in the south of eastern Siberia during the years 1855–59) published 1862–1863

Ongoing events

- John Gould The birds of Australia; Supplement 1851–69. 1 vol. 81 plates; Artists: J. Gould and H. C. Richter; Lithographer: H. C. Richter
- John Gould The birds of Asia; 1850-83 7 vols. 530 plates, Artists: J. Gould, H. C. Richter, W. Hart and J. Wolf; Lithographers:H. C. Richter and W. Hart
- The Ibis
