= Johann Wilhelm von Müller =

German ornithologist and explorer

Baron Johann Wilhelm von Müller
- Born: 4 March 1824
- Died: 24 October 1866
- Occupation(s): Ornithologist and explorer

Baron Johann Wilhelm von Müller (4 March 1824 – 24 October 1866) was a German ornithologist and explorer.

== Early life ==
Müller was born in Kochersteinsfeld, Neckarsulm, the grandson of the banker Johannes Müller. In 1845 he travelled to Morocco and Algiers, and in 1847 embarked on a longer African journey, accompanied by Alfred Brehm as his secretary. They travelled through Egypt to Khartoum and Kordofan, returning to Alexandria in February 1849.

Müller left Brehm there and returned to Germany with the natural history specimens collected on his journey, and made plans for a third expedition. Unfortunately Müller ran into financial difficulties and was not able to rejoin Brehm, instead sending him funds to proceed to Khartoum with Alfred's brother Oskar and a doctor called Richard Vierthaler.

== Publications ==
In the autumn of 1849 Müller began publication of the ornithological journal Naumannia, edited by Eduard Baldamus. He also began work on an illustrated book entitled Beiträge zur Ornithologie Afrikas (1853-1870), of which only five parts were ever published. In 1852 he purchased the natural history collection of Christian Ludwig Landbeck before the latter's emigration to Chile. Later in that same year he became director of the Brussels Zoological Garden, resigning in 1854. He then travelled to North America, and on his return wrote Reisen in den Vereinigten Staaten, Canada, und Mexiko (1864-1865).

Müller is commemorated in the scientific name of the blue-headed bee-eater, Merops muelleri.

The Müllerberget mountain in Edgeøya, Svalbard, is named after him.
