= 1856 in birding and ornithology =

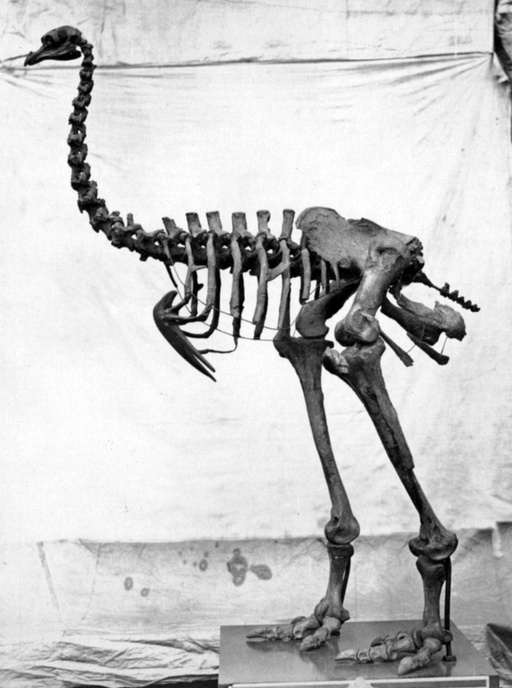
Heavy-footed moa described by Richard Owen in 1856

- John Cassin publishes a complete set of his Illustrations of the Birds of California, Texas, Oregon, British, and Russian America, which had been published serially from 1853 – 1855.
- Léon Olphe-Galliard takes part in the second congress of Deutsche Ornithologen-Gesellschaft at Gothen in Germany, where he meets Prince Lucien Bonaparte, and other scientists.
- Johan August Wahlberg, who provided early records of the birds of Africa, is killed by a wounded elephant while exploring in Botswana.
- Birds described in 1856 include kea, Brewer's sparrow, western bronze-naped pigeon, yellow-spotted barbet, barred parakeet,
- In October the red-necked nightjar occurred in Britain.
- Marc Athanase Parfait Oeillet Des Murs publishes the ornithological section of Voyage autour du monde sur la frégate la Vénus in collaboration with Florent Prévost.
- Henry Haversham Godwin-Austen joins the Great Trigonometric Survey of India .
- Robert Swinhoe makes an "adventurous" visit to the camphor districts of Formosa

Ongoing events

- John Gould, The birds of Australia; Supplement 1851–69. 1 vol. 81 plates; Artists: J. Gould and H. C. Richter; Lithographer: H. C. Richter
- John Gould, The Birds of Asia; 1850-83, 7 vols., 530 plates. Artists: J. Gould, H. C. Richter, W. Hart and J. Wolf; Lithographers: H. C. Richter and W. Hart
