= 1862 in birding and ornithology =

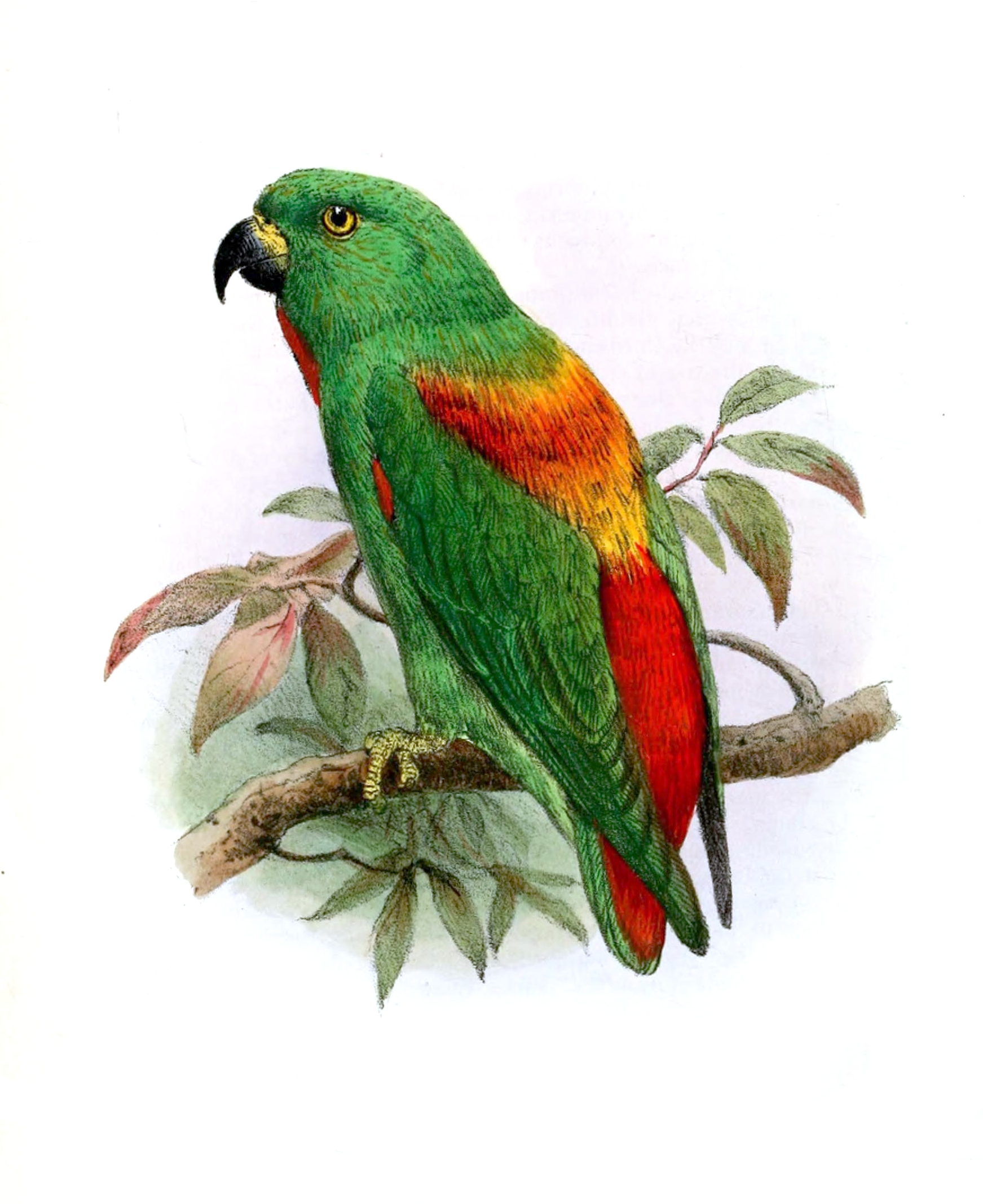
Sula hanging parrot Proceedings of the Zoological Society of London 1862

- Alfred Newton published A list of the birds of Europe, a translation of the Aves section of Die wirbelthiere Europa's by Johann Heinrich Blasius.
- Graceanna Lewis begins ornithological study at the Philadelphia Academy of Natural Sciences and meets John Cassin.
- Ferdinand Stoliczka joins the Geological Survey of India.
- Birds described in 1862 include American herring gull, slaty-backed forest falcon, Principe seedeater, yellow-throated spadebill, Réunion harrier, Wallace's fairywren,
- Alfred Malherbe publishes his fourth and final volume of Monographie des picidées (Monograph on the Picidae).
- Hermann Schlegel begins a vast work of 14 volumes Muséum d'histoire naturelle des Pays-Bas.

Ongoing events

- John Gould The birds of Australia; Supplement 1851–69. 1 vol. 81 plates; Artists: J. Gould and H. C. Richter; Lithographer: H. C. Richter
- John Gould The birds of Asia; 1850-83 7 vols. 530 plates, Artists: J. Gould, H. C. Richter, W. Hart and J. Wolf; Lithographers:H. C. Richter and W. Hart
- The Ibis
