= Johann Zelebor =

Austrian naturalist, illustrator and zoologist

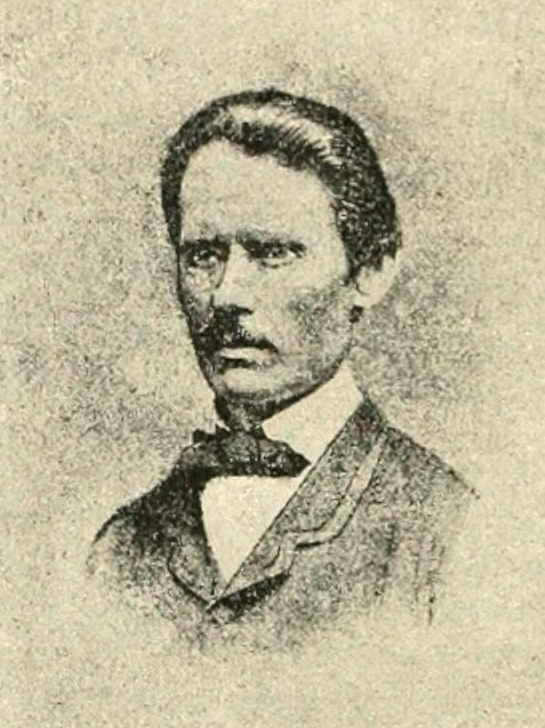

Johann Zelebor (5 February 1815 – 19 February 1869) was an Austrian naturalist, illustrator and zoologist.

== Life ==
Zelebor was born on 5 February 1815 in Eggenburg, Lower Austria. Prior to 1845 he worked as a carpenter, afterwards serving as a taxidermist at the Naturalien-Cabinet in Vienna. In 1857 he became an assistant at the aforementioned institution, later receiving a promotion as a "curator-adjunct".

He took part in the expedition Reise der österreichischen Fregatte Novara um die Erde (1861–1876) ("Journey of the Austrian frigate Novara around the Earth, 1861–1876"). In addition to the Novara expedition, Zelebor took zoological journeys to the Balkans, Crete and Egypt during his career.

Zelebor died on 19 February 1869 in Vienna.

== Works ==
- Zelebor, Johnann, August von Pelzeln, Franz Steindachner, and Rudolf Kner, Reise der österreichischen Fregatte Novara um die Erde (1861–1876 ("Journey of the Austrian frigate Novara around the Earth") Zoolologischer Thiel. Ester Band, (Wirbelthiere). 1. Säugethiere 2. Vögel 3. Reptilien 4. Amphibien 5. Fische, Hof- und Staatsdruckerei, Vienna, 1869. [Volume 1]

== See also ==
- European and American voyages of scientific exploration
