= List of years in birding and ornithology =

The following entries cover events related to birding and ornithology which occurred in the listed year.

== 1800s ==
1800 1801 1802 1803 1804 1805 1806 1807 1808 1809
1810 1811 1812 1813 1814 1815 1816 1817 1818 1819
1820 1821 1822 1823 1824 1825 1826 1827 1828 1829
1830 1831 1832 1833 1834 1835 1836 1837 1838 1839
1840 1841 1842 1843 1844 1845 1846 1847 1848 1849
1850 1851 1852 1853 1854 1855 1856 1857 1858 1859
1860 1861 1862 1863 1864 1865 1866 1867 1868 1869
1870 1871 1872 1873 1874 1875 1876 1877 1878 1879
1880 1881 1882 1883 1884 1885 1886 1887 1888 1889
1890 1891 1892 1893 1894 1895 1896 1897 1898 1899

== 1900s ==
1900 1901 1902 1903 1904 1905 1906 1907 1908 1909
1910 1911 1912 1913 1914 1915 1916 1917 1918 1919
1920 1921 1922 1923 1924 1925 1926 1927 1928 1929
1930 1931 1932 1933 1934 1935 1936 1937 1938 1939
1940 1941 1942 1943 1944 1945 1946 1947 1948 1949
1950 1951 1952 1953 1954 1955 1956 1957 1958 1959
1960 1961 1962 1963 1964 1965 1966 1967 1968 1969
1970 1971 1972 1973 1974 1975 1976 1977 1978 1979
1980s 1981 1982 1983 1984 1985 1986 1987 1988 1989
1990 1991 1992 1993 1994 1995 1996 1997 1998 1999

== 2000s ==
2000 2001 2002 2003 2004 2005 2006 2007 2008 2009
2010 2011 2012 2013 2014 2015 2016 2017 2018 2019
2020 2021 2022 2023 2024 2025 2026
