= 1845 in birding and ornithology =

- Jacques Pucheran erects the genus Aramides in Revue et Magasin de Zoologie
- Death of Christoph Feldegg
- Death of Philipp Jakob Cretzschmar
- John Cassin describes the lesser yellow-headed vulture in Proceedings of the Academy of Natural Sciences of Philadelphia
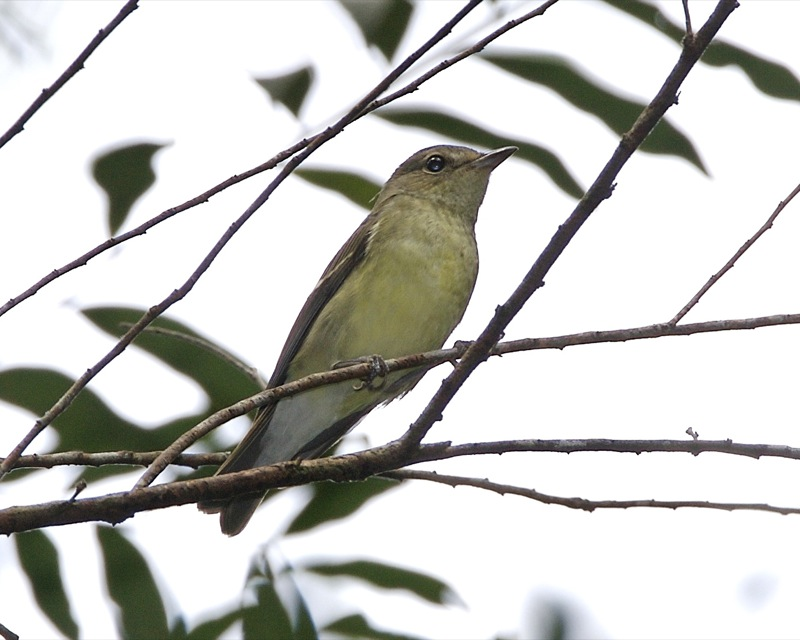
  The yellow-rumped flycatcher was described by Arthur Hay in 1845
- George Robert Gray describes the Fuegian snipe in The Zoology of the Voyage of HMS Erebus and HMS Terror
- Foundation of Latvian Museum of Natural History
- August Carl Eduard Baldamus invites 32 ornithologists to form an ornithological section of Gesellschaft Deutscher Naturforscher und Artze. (Society of German Nature Researchers and Doctors). One result is the publication of the bird journal Rhea by Ludwig Thienemann
- Florent Prévost with C. L. Lemaire publishes Histoire Naturelle des Oiseaux d'Europe
- Nérée Boubée establishes "Maison Boubée" in Paris. It is a natural history dealership and publishing house.

Ongoing events

- Fauna Japonica
