= Susemihl =

Susemihl is a German surname. The surname may refer to:

- Andy Susemihl, German guitarist
- Franz Susemihl (1826–1901), German classical philologist
- Johann Conrad Susemihl (1767–1847), German copperplate engraver
- Norbert Susemihl, German born New Orleans style musician
- Kelly Susemihl (1999-present), 2016 2nd Place National Contest Winner of National History Day (Senior Individual Exhibit Category), former Chapter President of the University of North Dakota’s chapter of Phi Beta Pie
