= 1846 in birding and ornithology =

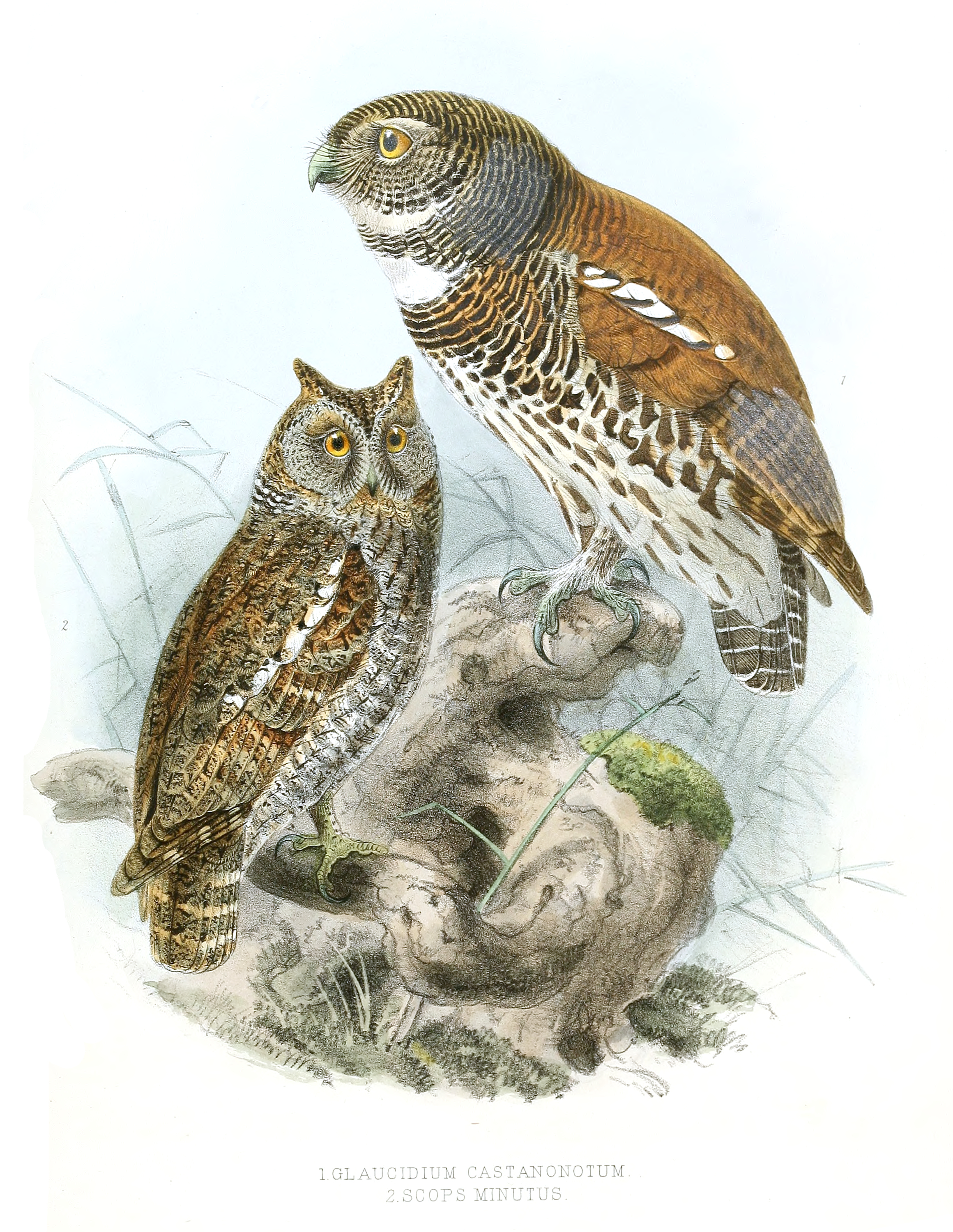
The chestnut-backed owlet was described on 1846 by Edward Blyth in his Catalogue of the birds in the museum [of the] Asiatic Society

- Death of Giuseppe Acerbi descriptor of the Yelkouan shearwater
- Foundation of Ipswich Museum
- Bernard du Bus de Gisignies becomes the first director of the Royal Belgian Institute of Natural Sciences He donates 2474 birds from his own collection to the museum.
- Francois Massena sells his bird collection to Thomas Bellerby Wilson.
- Death of Jean Baptiste Bory de Saint-Vincent
- Nicobar megapode described by Edward Blyth
- Alexandre Baudrimont Recherches anatomiques et physiologiques sur le développement du fœtus: et en particulier sur l'évolution embryonnaire des oiseaux et des batraciens (with G. J. Martin Saint-Ange)
- John McClelland becomes interim superintendent of the Calcutta Botanical Garden
- Isidore Geoffroy Saint-Hilaire seeks a collaboration with Movement of the International Literary Exchanges, between France and North America from January 1845 to May, 1846 With Instructions for Collecting, Preparing, and Forwarding Objects of Natural History Written by The Professors Administrators of The Museum Of Natural History At Paris.
- Jacques Pucheran publishes Observations sur les types peu connus du Musée de Paris, par M. le docteur Pucheran -Premier article (Genre Dicaeus). Revue zoologique. Band 9, 1846, S. 134–136 online Gallica the first of a series on the types of birds in the Paris Museum.
- Death of Johann Conrad Susemihl

Ongoing events

- Fauna Japonica
