= Kurimoto =

Kurimoto (written: 栗本) is a Japanese surname. Notable people with the surname include:

- Kaoru Kurimoto (栗本 薫, 1953–2009), pen name of Sumiyo Imaoka, Japanese writer
- Kurimoto Masayoshi (栗本 昌蔵, 1756–1834), Japanese naturalist, zoologist and entomologist
- Shinichiro Kurimoto (栗本 慎一郎, born 1941), Japanese writer and politician

== See also ==
- Kurimoto, Chiba, a former town in Katori District, Chiba Prefecture, Japan
