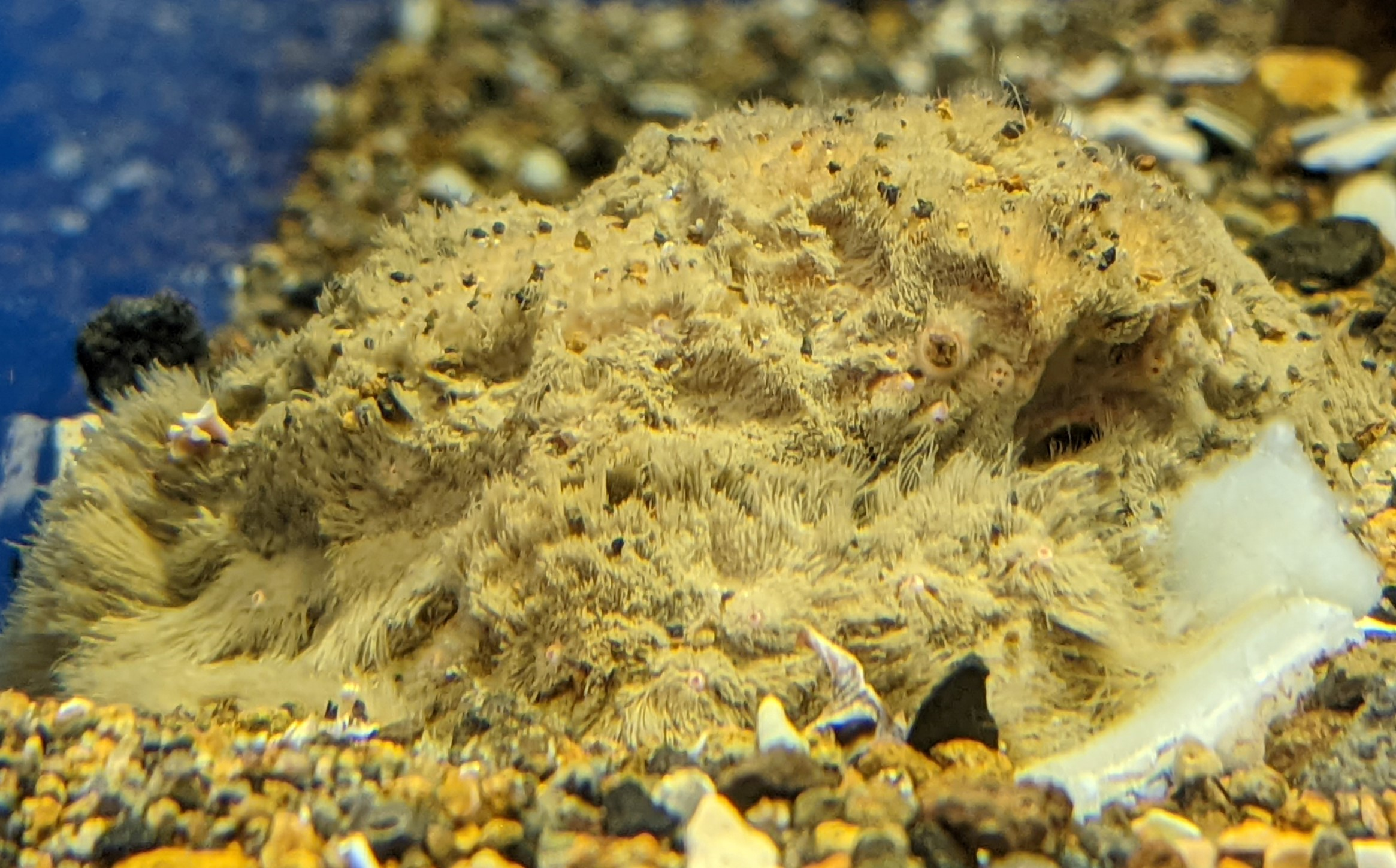

Scientific classification
- Kingdom: Animalia
- Phylum: Arthropoda
- Class: Malacostraca
- Order: Decapoda
- Suborder: Pleocyemata
- Infraorder: Brachyura
- Family: Xanthidae
- Genus: Trichia
- Species: T. dromiaeformis

Binomial name
- Trichia dromiaeformis De Haan, 1839

Synonyms
- Zalasius dromiaeformis (De Haan, 1839)

= Trichia dromiaeformis =

Species of crustacean

Trichia dromiaeformis is a crab that lives in the waters of the western Pacific, both the northern and southern hemisphere. It was described as Zalasius dromiaeformis by Mary J. Rathbun in 1897, and this name is still sometimes used. It was first described by De Haan in 1839. It is of the genus Trichia, and family Xanthidae. They are extremely camouflaged and live in sandy, muddy substrate. It grows shaggy hair on its dorsal side and the outside of its legs that resembles algae.
