= 1810 in birding and ornithology =

- Constantine Samuel Rafinesque describes the zitting cisticola.
- George Perry describes the brolga.
- John James Audubon meets Alexander Wilson, author of American Ornithology.
- Moritz Balthasar Borkhausen publishes Deutsche Ornithologie oder Naturgeschichte aller Vögel Deutschlands (Natural history of German birds).

Ongoing events Alexander Wilson continues work on Ornithology of America (1808–1814). Species he described in 1810 include the American tree sparrow, the pine siskin, the blue-headed vireo, the mourning warbler and the marsh wren.
