= 1844 in birding and ornithology =

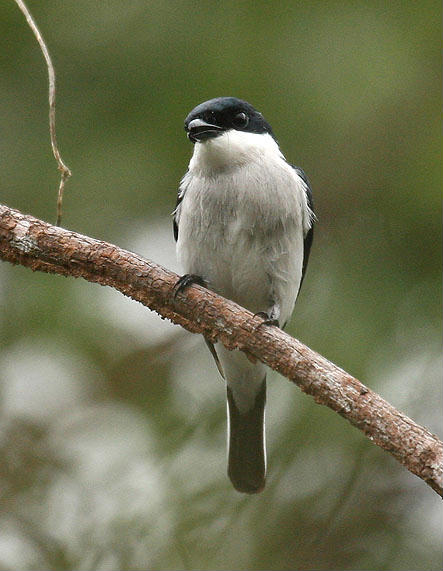
Hemipus hirundinaceus the genus Hemipus was erected by Brian Houghton Hodgson in 1844

- Richard Owen describes Anomalopteryx and publishes History of British Fossil Mammals and Birds (1844–1846)
- Graceanna Lewis (1821–1912) publishes A Natural History of Birds.
- Jerdon's leafbird described by Edward Blyth
- Johann Jakob von Tschudi publishes Untersuchungen uber die Fauna Perus (1844–47)
- George Robert Gray publishes Genera of Birds (1844–49), illustrated by David William Mitchell and Joseph Wolf
- Death of Étienne Geoffroy Saint-Hilaire
- Fauna Japonica Aves commenced (1844–1850)
- Johann Jakob Kaup publishes Classification der Säugethiere und Vögel
- Last great auk killed 3 July 1844 on Eldey, Iceland
- Pierre Adolphe Delattre publishes Ornithologie d'Europe Douai
