= Kurimoto Masayoshi =

Japanese naturalist, zoologist and entomologist

- Born: August 22, 1756; Kyoto, Japan
- Died: May 3, 1834 (aged 77); Kyoto, Japan
- Education: Kyoto University
- Known for: Studying bird life in Japan and East Asia

Kurimoto Masayoshi (栗本 昌臧; August 22, 1756 – May 3, 1834) was a Japanese physician, naturalist, zoologist and entomologist.

He was physician to the 11th Tokugawa shōgun, Tokugawa Ienari, and lectured on materia medica. In 1811 he compiled 3-volume work entitled "Senchu-fû", roughly translated is "Thousand Insects Manuscript", which is an illustrated book of detailed insects, arachnids, crustaceans, and invertebrates known in Japan.

In 1826 Kurimoto met Philipp Franz von Siebold and they worked together. Kurimoto supplied Siebold drawings of crustaceans, including an illustration of Squilla maculata (a Mantis shrimp), which was used by Wilhem de Haan in "Fauna Japonica".
