= 1800 in birding and ornithology =

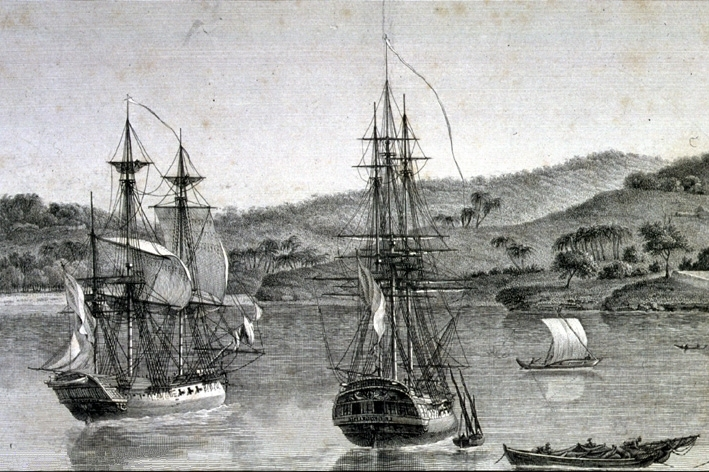
Nicolas Baudin's ships the Géographe and the Naturaliste

- Georg Adolf Suckow, 1800–1801. Anfangsgründe der theoretischen und angewandten Naturgeschichte der Thiere. Von den Vögeln. Zweiten Theiles erste Abtheilung. Landvögel. Raubvögel und Spechtartige Vögel. Zweiten Theiles zweite Abtheilung. Landvögel Singvögel und hühnerartige Vögel

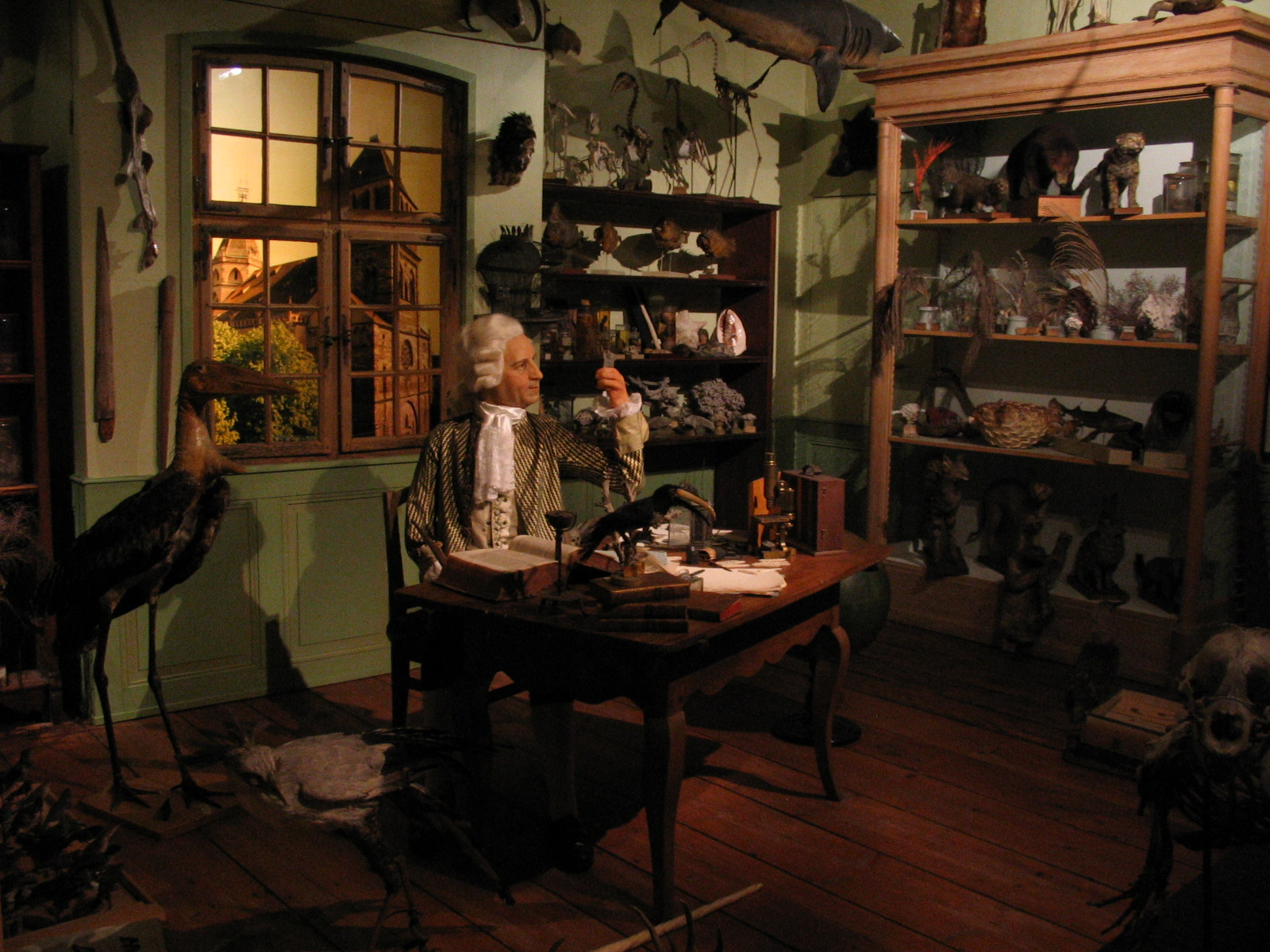
Reconstruction of the Zoological Museum of Johann Hermann

- François Marie Daudin Traité Élémentaire et Complet d'Ornithologie ou Histoire Naturelle des Oiseaux. (F.M. Daudin, ed.). Chez l'auteur, Paris, France
- Johann Conrad Susemihl began a 22 part work on the birds of Germany, "Teutsche Ornithologie oder Naturgeschichte aller Vögel Teutschlands in naturgetreuen Abbildungen und Beschreibungen" completed in 1817.
- Jacques Labillardière published the very popular Relation du Voyage à la Recherche de la Pérouse.
- Death of Johann Hermann, a naturalist who described Saggitarius, the genus of the secretarybird.
- Death of Jean-Baptiste Audebert, an artist most well-known in ornithology for his copper plate illustrations of birds.
- Jean Baptiste Leschenault de la Tour sailed from France as a naturalist on Nicolas Baudin's expedition to Australia. In April 1803 he fell ill and had to be put ashore at Timor. He spent the next three years on Java returning to France in July 1807 with a large collection of plants and birds. Many of the new bird species found on the Baudin Expedition were described by Louis Pierre Vieillot in Nouveau dictionnaire d'histoire naturelle (1816–1819).The specimens are in Muséum national d'histoire naturelle in Paris.
