= 1847 in birding and ornithology =

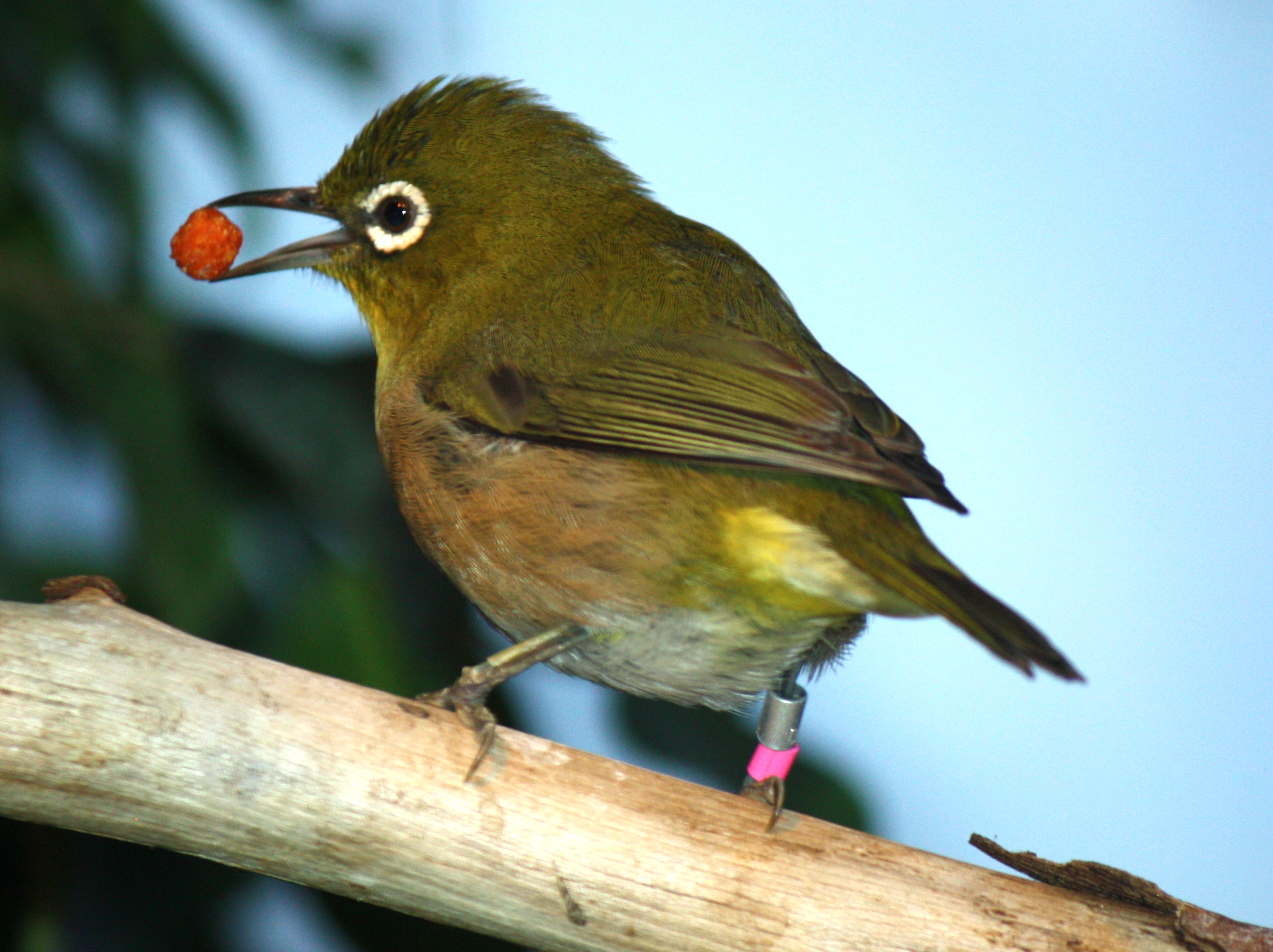
The Japanese white-eye was described by Hermann Schlegel and Coenraad Jacob Temminck in 1847

- Alfred Edmund Brehm joins Johann Wilhelm von Müller on an expedition to Egypt, the Sudan, and the Sinai Peninsula.
- Death of Giuseppe Géné
- René Primevère Lesson receives the Legion of Honour
- Jean Louis Cabanis erects the genus Geothlypis in Ornithologische Notizen. Archiv für Naturgeschichte
- William Henry Edwards publishes A Voyage Up the River Amazon, with a residency at Pará

Ongoing events

- Fauna Japonica
