= 1833 in birding and ornithology =

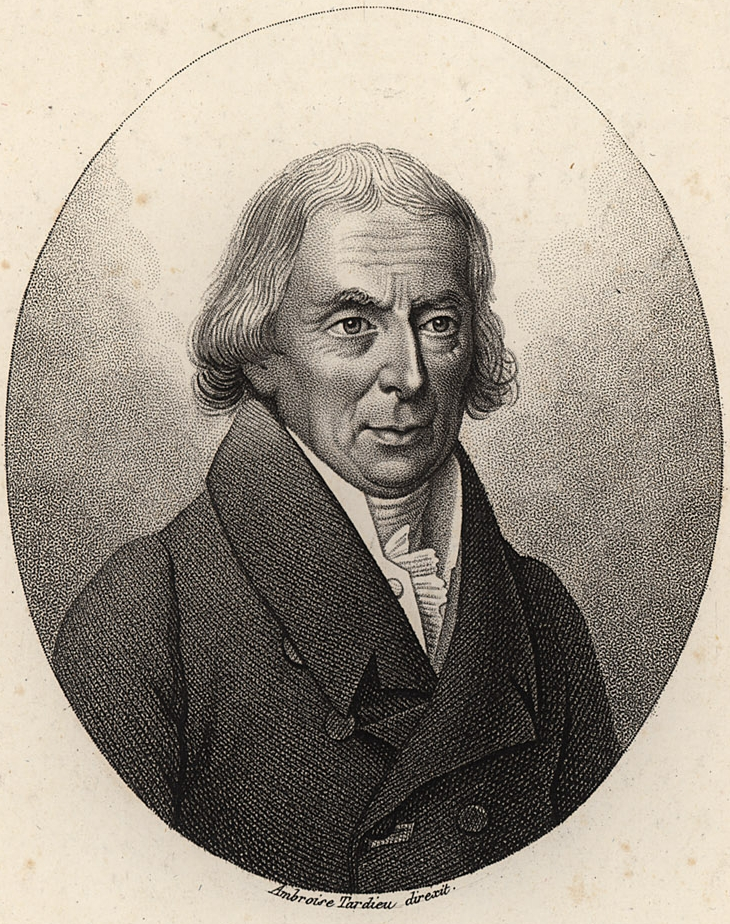
René Louiche Desfontaines better known as a botanist but posthumous author of Desfontaines's Mémoire sur quelques nouvelles espèces d'oiseaux des côtes de Barbarie

- Death of Félix Louis L'Herminier
- Samuel Tickell describes new birds from India in the Journal of The Asiatic Society of Bengal. These include the jungle owlet, Tickell's thrush and the thick-billed flowerpecker.
- Richard Owen dissects a specimen of a great hornbill noting highly pneumatized bones, with hollow air cavities extending to the tips of their wing bones.
- Brian Houghton Hodgson becomes British Resident in Kathmandu
- William Jardine unites the hermit hummingbirds in a new subfamily the Phaethornithinae
- Death of René Louiche Desfontaines
- Prince Maximilian of Wied-Neuwied expedition to the Interior of North America. One of the birds discovered was the pinyon jay.
- Constantin Wilhelm Lambert Gloger theorises that dark pigments increase in races of animals living in warm and humid habitats in a work entitled Das Abändern der Vögel durch Einfluss des Klima's
