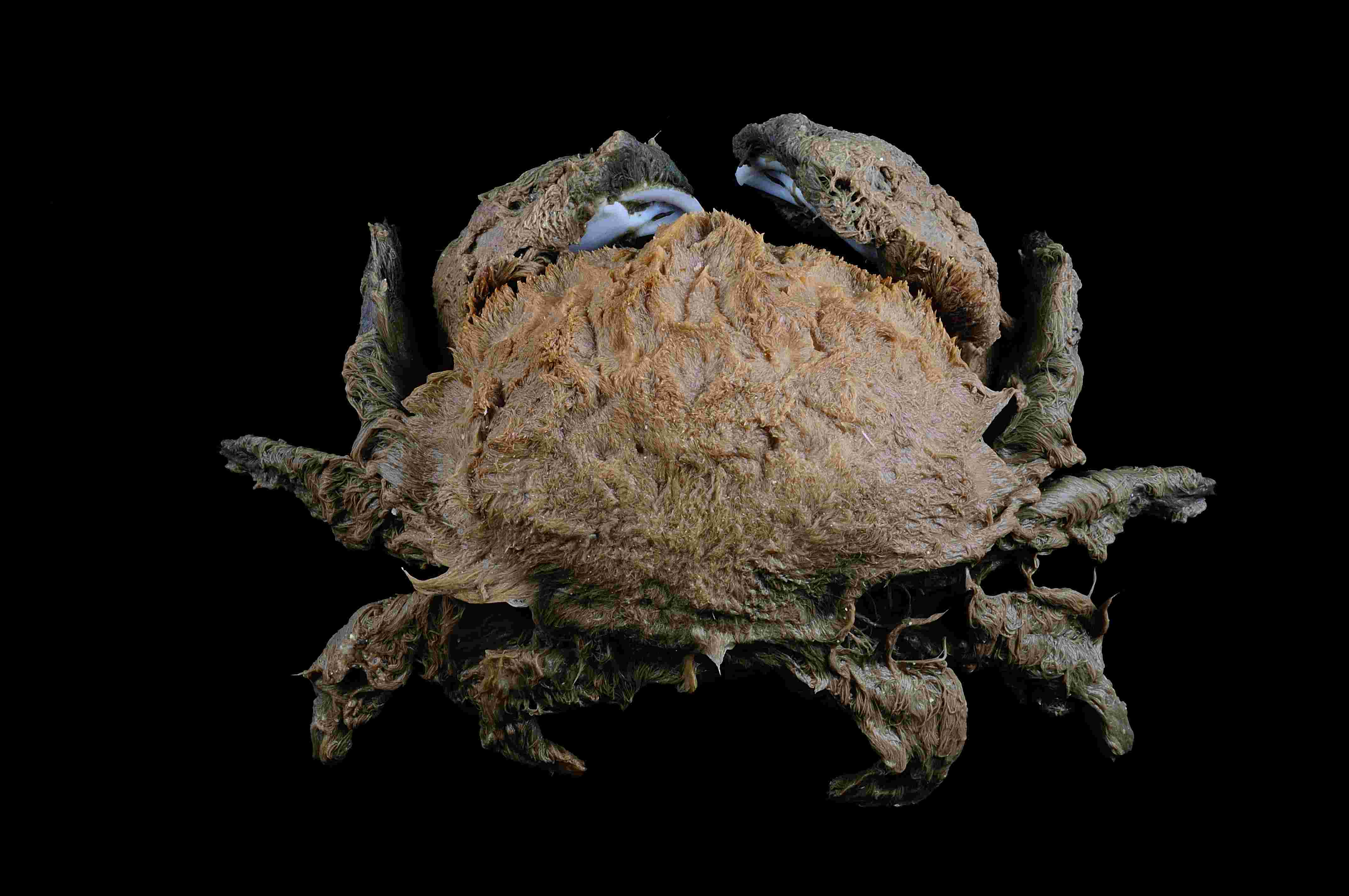
- Trichia horii

Scientific classification
- Domain: Eukaryota
- Kingdom: Animalia
- Phylum: Arthropoda
- Class: Malacostraca
- Order: Decapoda
- Suborder: Pleocyemata
- Infraorder: Brachyura
- Family: Xanthidae
- Subfamily: Banareiinae
- Genus: Trichia; De Haan, 1839

= Trichia (crab) =

Genus of crabs

Trichia is a genus of crabs in the family Xanthidae, containing the following species:

- Trichia australis Baker, 1906
- Trichia dromiaeformis De Haan, 1839
- Trichia horii (Miyake, 1940)
- Trichia imajimai (Takeda & Miyake, 1969)
- Trichia indica (Sankarankutty, 1968)
- Trichia sakaii (Balss, 1938)
