= 1832 in birding and ornithology =

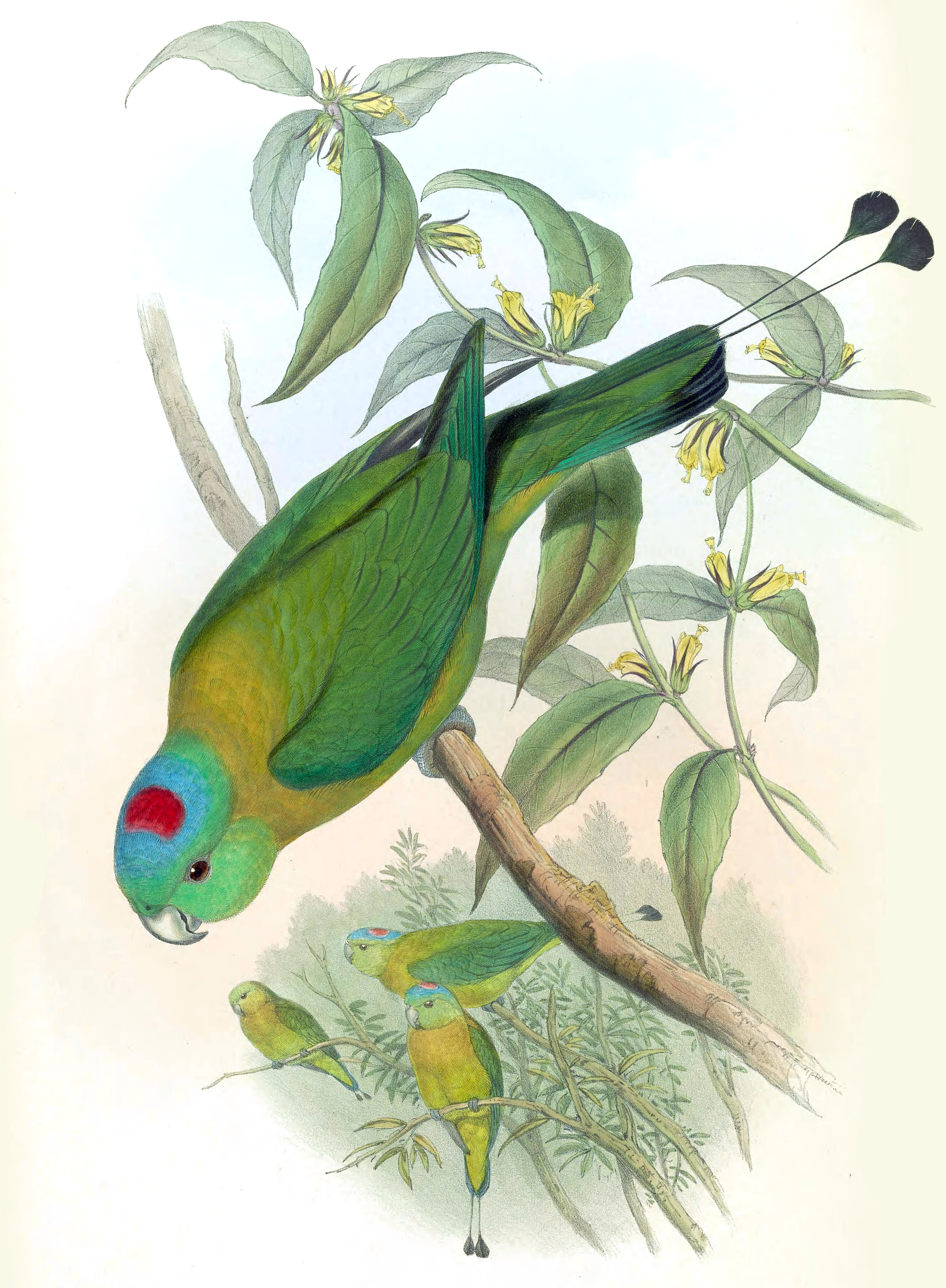
Prioniturus flavicans. The genus Prioniturus was erected by Johann Georg Wagler in this year

- William Henry Sykes publishes his catalogues of birds and mammals of the Deccan in the Proceedings of the Zoological Society of London. This included fifty-six birds new to science, including the Indian pond heron.
- Édouard Ménétries describes Menetries's warbler (as Sylvia mystacea).
- René Primevère Lesson commences Illustrations de Zoologie (1832–35)
- Johann Georg Wagler establishes several new genera of ibis, including Theristicus and Geronticus.
- Death of Georges Cuvier
- Death of Karl Rudolphi
- Death of Louis Dufresne
- Charles Lucien Bonaparte commences Iconografia della Fauna Italica (1832–1841)
- The Reverend John Bachman, who presented study skins and descriptions to his friend and collaborator John James Audubon, discovers Bachman's warbler.
- George Loddiges describes the mountain avocetbill, the Tyrian metaltail and the buff-tailed coronet
