= 1848 in birding and ornithology =

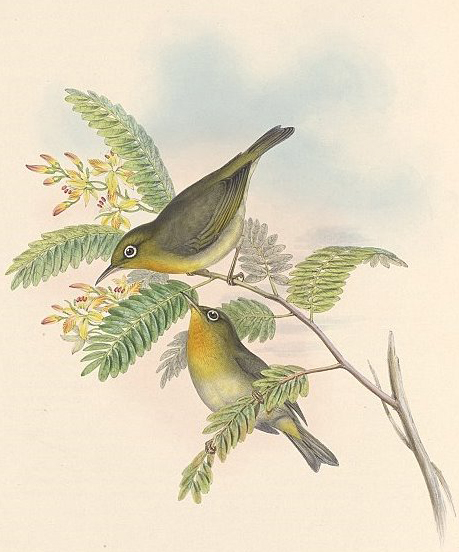
The slender-billed white-eye was described by John Gould in 1848.

- Ludwig Becker, a painter and naturalist, leaves Germany for Australia during the 1848 revolution.
- Thomas Richard Heywood Thomson and William Allen publish a narrative of their exploration of the Niger River.
- Hugh Edwin Strickland publishes The Dodo and its Kindred.
- Ludwig Leichhardt vanishes in the Australian Outback as is presumed dead.
- Joseph Wolf, a major illustrator for John Gould's The Birds of Great Britain, among other ornithological compendiums, arrives in London.
