= 1849 in birding and ornithology =

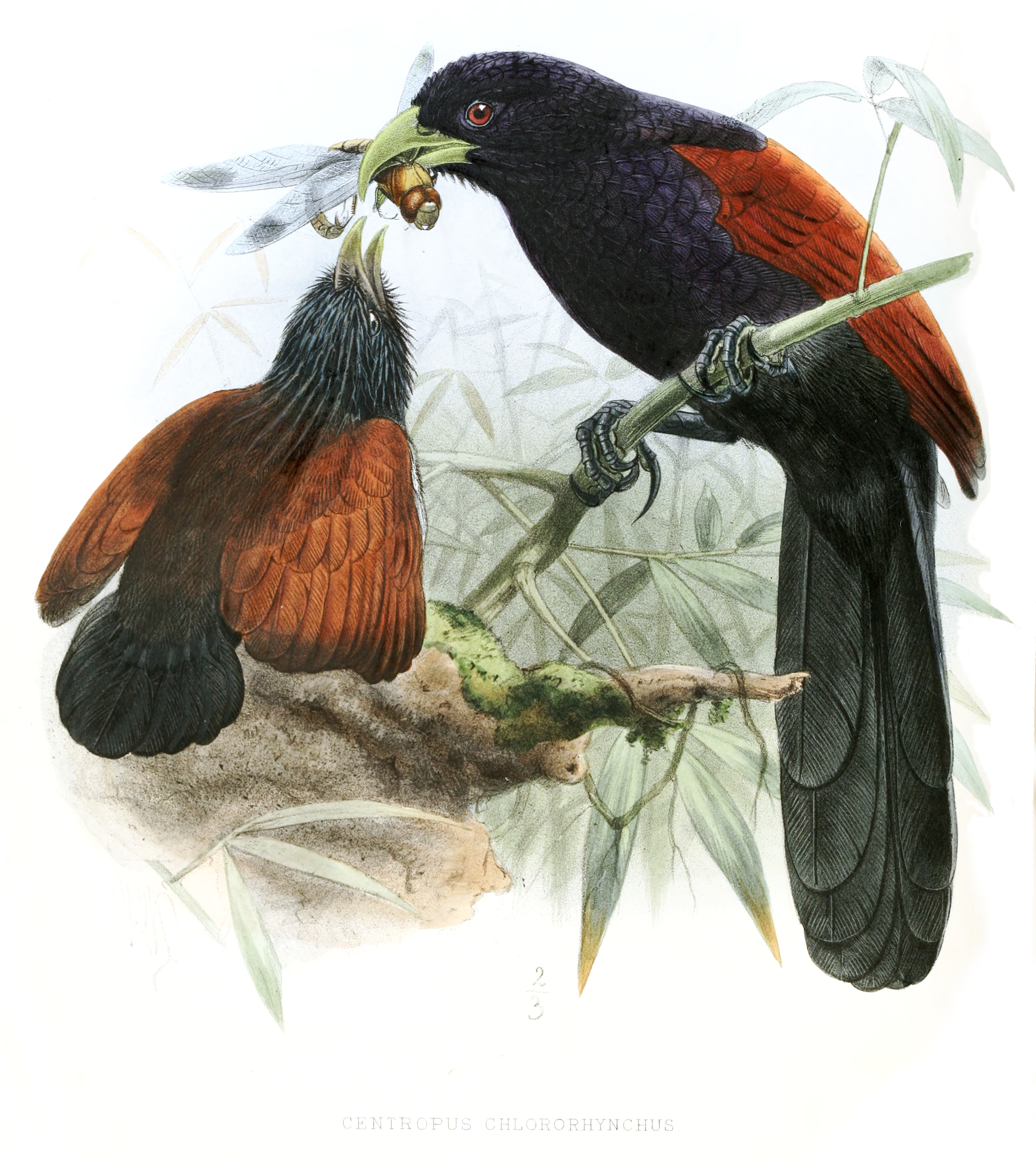
The green-billed coucal was described in 1849 by Edward Blyth.

- Death of John Cotton, an early cataloguer of the birds of Victoria, Australia.
- Louis Fraser publishes Zoologica Typica, describing the new specimens held by the Zoological Society of London.
- Death of William Gambel, who first described Gambel's quail and Nuttall's woodpecker, and is the namesake of the mountain chickadee (Poecile gambeli).
- Death of Johann Centurius Hoffmannsegg, who contributed a large number of specimens to the Berlin Museum, including the holotype of Ardea leuce – a synonym of great egret.
- Philip Henry Gosse publishes Popular British Ornithology and a companion Illustrations of the Birds of Jamaica to his 1847 work, The Birds of Jamaica.
- The National Museum of Singapore begins, stemming from artifact donations to the Singapore Library.
