= 1827 in birding and ornithology =

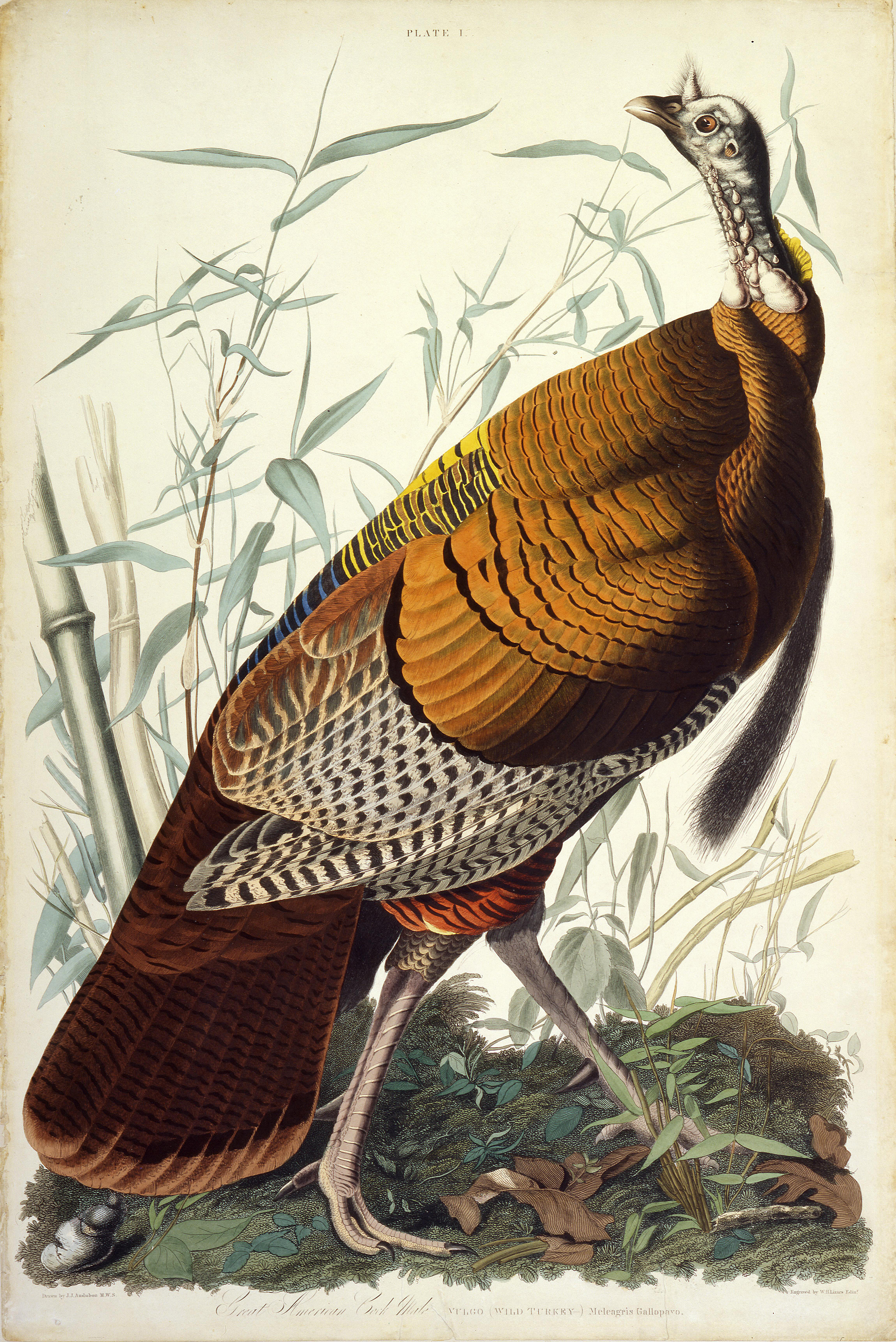
- Wild Turkey, plate number one of Audubon's Birds of America
  First part of Birds of America by John James Audubon published. This work was originally published via a subscription model, with 5 plate illustrations per installment.
- Death of Morten Thrane Brünnich, the author of Ornithologia Borealis and the namesake of Brünnich's guillemot.
- Thomas Conrad von Baldenstein describes the willow tit (as Parus cinereus montanus, a subspecies of cinereous tit).
- Thomas Horsfield and Nicholas Aylward Vigors publish A description of the Australian birds in the collection of the Linnean Society with an attempt at arranging them according to their natural affinities
- William Swainson publishes descriptions of the birds collected by W. Bullock on a trip to Mexico, in which Bullock's oriole and red-headed tanager are first described.
- Grant Museum of Zoology and Comparative Anatomy established by Robert Edmond Grant who had campaigning for a new Zoological Society museum run professionally rather than by aristocratic grandees and tried to turn the British Museum into a research institution run along French lines.
- René Primevère Lesson new bird species in Voyage autour du monde exécuté par Ordre du Roi sur la Corvette de Sa Majesté, La Coquille pendant les années 1822, 1823, 1824 et 1825 (Atlas)
- Giuseppe Acerbi describes the Yelkouan shearwater
- Charles Lucien Bonaparte publishes Specchio Comparativo delle Ornithologie di Roma e di Filadelfia in Pisa
- 1827-1833 Jan van der Hoeven publishes "Handboek der Dierkunde" A second edition was published in 1855
