= 1808 in birding and ornithology =

- Louis Pierre Vieillot commences Histoire naturelle des oiseaux de l'Amérique septentrionale. Desray, Paris (1807-1808).
- Alexander Wilson commences the nine-volume American Ornithology (1808–1814), illustrating 268 species of birds, 26 of which had not previously been described.
- John William Lewin's Birds of New Holland with their Natural History published in London. He writes the first description of the Regent bowerbird in this work.
- Coenraad Jacob Temminck publishes Histoire naturelle générale des pigeons et des gallinacés. Sepps, Amsterdam 1808–15.
