= 1812 in birding and ornithology =

- Academy of Natural Sciences founded in Philadelphia. It is the first natural science research institution and museum in the New World.
- Samuel Thomas von Sömmerring describes Ornithocephalus antiquus now known as Pterodactylus.The animal was described as being both a mammal, a bat, and a form in between mammals and birds. George Cuvier and provided a lengthy description in which he restated his previous view that the fossil animal was a reptile.

Ongoing events

- George Shaw General Zoology, or Systematic Natural History (1809-1826) Species described in this work in 1812 include blue-tufted starthroat, red-tailed comet, greater vasa parrot, copper sunbird, glittering-bellied emerald and purple-banded sunbird.
- Alexander Wilson Ornithology of America (1808–1814) Species described in this work in 1812 include fish crow, whip-poor-will and Connecticut warbler
