= 1809 in birding and ornithology =

- Geoffroy Saint-Hilaire describes the Amazonian umbrellabird in Annales Muséum National D'Histoire Naturelle, par les professeurs de cet éstablissement.Ouvrage orné de gravures.
- The bird collection of the Muséum national d'histoire naturelle bird collection reaches 3411 specimens. At this date it is the largest in the world.
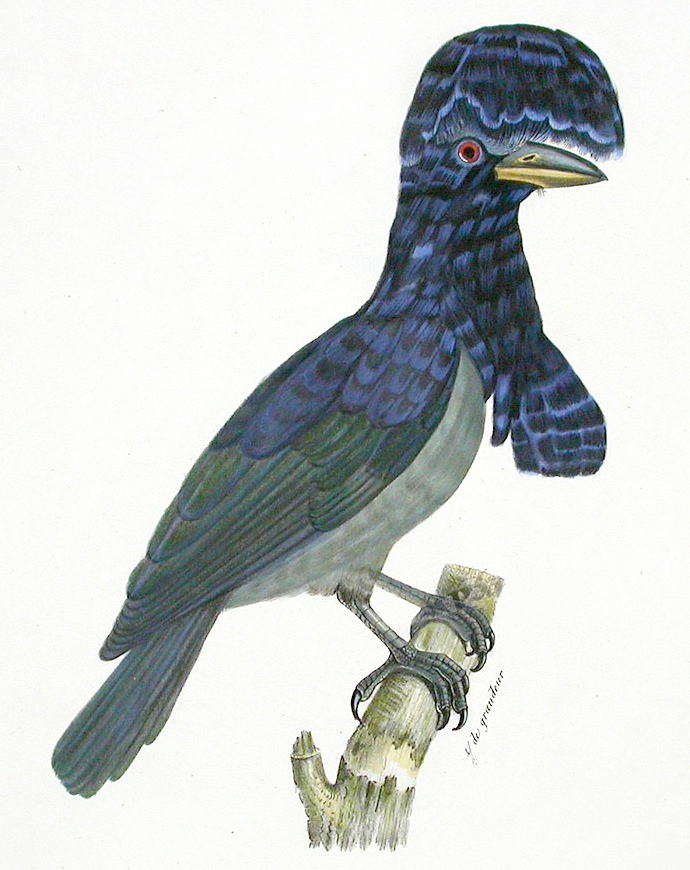
  The Amazonian umbrellabird Cephalopterus ornatus Plate from Louis Pierre Vieillot La Galerie des oiseaux
- Johann Matthäus Bechstein completes Gemeinnützige Naturgeschichte Deutschlands nach allen drey Reichen.
- Marie Jules César Savigny describes Pharaoh's eagle-owl and the eastern imperial eagle in Description de l'Égypte the work describing the scientific discoveries of Emperor Napoleon's French campaign in Egypt and Syria
- Louis Pierre Vieillot describes the Louisiana waterthrush and other North American birds in Histoire naturelle des oiseaux de l'Amérique Septentrionale (1807 1808 1809) using material gathered when he fled to the United States during the French Revolution
- Johann Centurius Hoffmannsegg founds the zoological museum of Berlin.
