= 1811 in birding and ornithology =

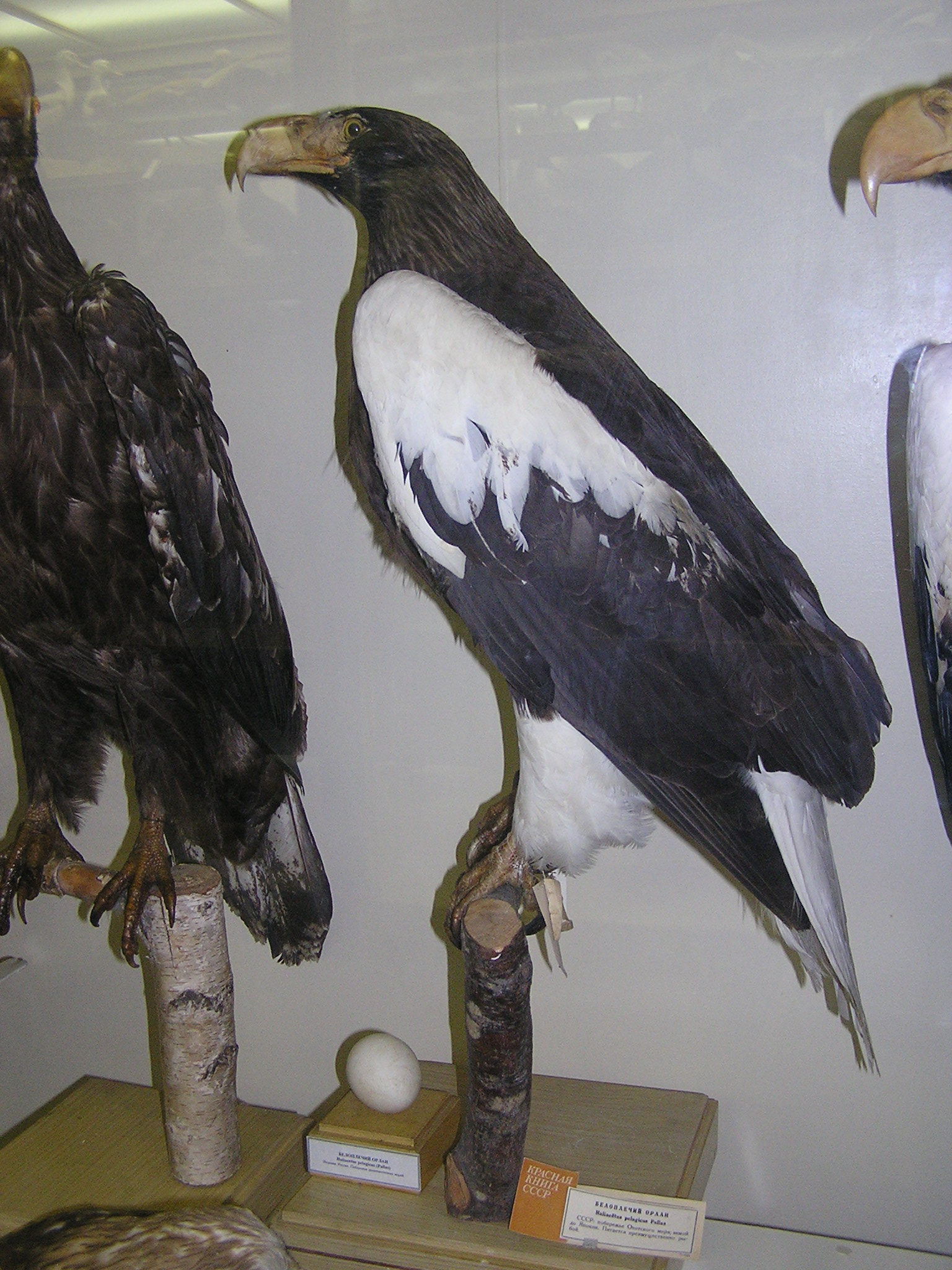
Steller's sea eagle in the Zoological Museum of the Zoological Institute of the Russian Academy of Sciences

- Two British naturalists, John Bradbury and Thomas Nuttall, accompany the Astor Expedition as far as South and North Dakota. Nuttall later writes an account of the birds seen in his 1832 work, Manual of the Ornithology of the United States and of Canada.
- Johann Karl Wilhelm Illiger proposes major updates to the Linnean taxonomic system, including introducing the taxa of Proboscidea, Dendrocolaptes, and Chauna.
- Peter Simon Pallas publishes Zoographia rosso-asiatica in Saint Petersburg. In this work he describes new birds from Russia and adjacent pelagic habitats. Species described in this work include Asian brown flycatcher, long-billed murrelet, spectacled cormorant, hill pigeon, Steller's sea eagle, Caspian gull and white-naped crane.
