= 1830 in birding and ornithology =

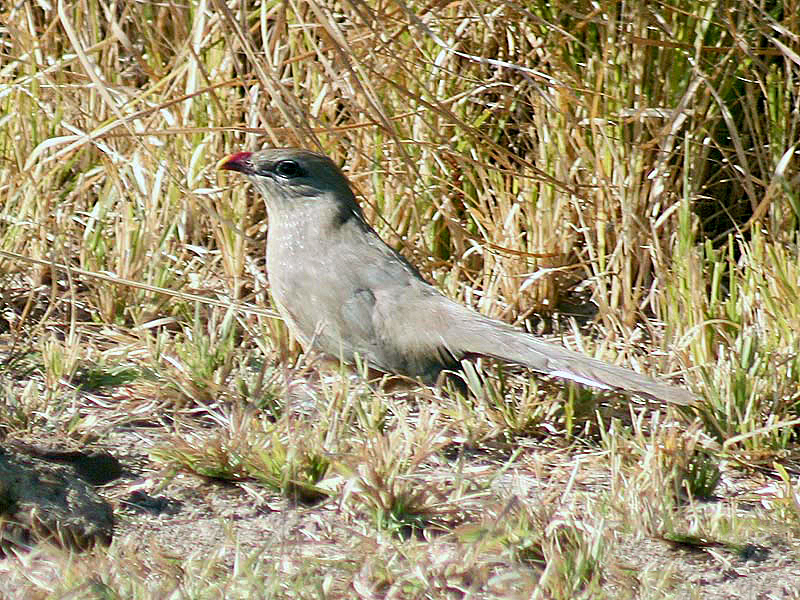
the Sirkeer malkoha described by Lesson in 1830 in Traite d'Ornithologie

- 1830–1835 Thomas Hardwicke collaborates with John Edward Gray in the publication of Illustrations of Indian Zoology
- John Gould publishes A Century of Birds from the Himalaya Mountains (1830–1832)
- Settlement of Chichi-jima begins leading to the extinction of the Bonin grosbeak
- Death of Joseph Philippe de Clairville and Charles Dumont de Sainte-Croix
- Karl Michahelles describes the western rock nuthatch
- Ferdinand Heine senior begins assembling a bird museum. It becomes one of the largest 19th-century collections de:Museum Heineanum
- Jacob Ernst von Reider and Carl Wilhelm Hahn begin Fauna Boica, oder gemeinnützige Naturgeschichte der Thiere Bayerns
- Joshua Brookes publishes Museum Brookesianum Embracing an Almost Endless Assemblage of Every Species of Anatomical, Pathological, Obstetrical, and Zootomical Preparations, as well as Subjects in Natural History
- A long known mixture of arsenic and soap used by taxidermists is popularized as the Bécœur recipe.

Ongoing events

- Coenraad Jacob Temminck Nouveau recueil de planches coloriées d'oiseaux Birds first described in this work in 1830 include the garnet pitta, the copper pheasant, the brown barbet, the blue-banded kingfisher, the Japanese wood-pigeon and the brown-eared bulbul
- René Primevère Lesson Traite d'Ornithologie
