= 1828 in birding and ornithology =

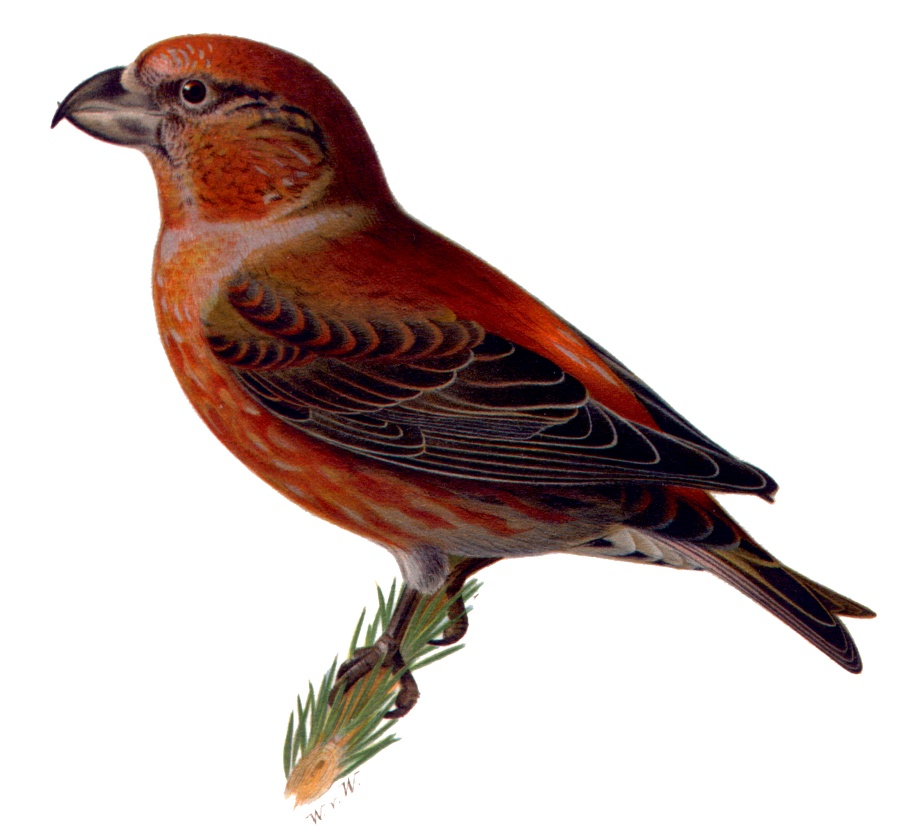
Illustration of Loxia pytyopsittacus in Svenska Foglar

- René Primevère Lesson publishes Manuel d'Ornithologie.
- Death of Thomas Bewick, a wood engraver who provided illustration for History of British Birds.
- Death of Carl Peter Thunberg, a student of Carl Linnaeus and the successor to Linnaeus's faculty appointment at Uppsala University. While Thunberg primarily worked in botany and with other animal taxa, he provided the first descriptions of Strix nebulosa ssp. lapponica in 1798 and several synonymous descriptions of other avian species.
- Magnus and Wilhelm von Wright begin the illustrative work Svenska Foglar (Swedish birds). Completion takes 10 years.
- Carl Friedrich Bruch proposes a system of trinomial nomenclature for species.
- Salomon Müller collects bird specimens for Coenraad Jacob Temminck on the island of Timor
- Christian Gottfried Ehrenberg and Wilhelm Hemprich describe the greater blue-eared glossy-starling and the rosy-patched bushshrike in Symbolae Physicae
- Phillip Parker King describes the imperial shag, the bronze-winged duck, the austral pygmy owl, the Patagonian crested duck, the Magellanic woodpecker, the rufous-legged owl and the austral rail.
- Sarah Countess Amherst, wife of William Pitt Amherst, Governor General of Bengal, sends the first specimen of Lady Amherst's pheasant to London.

Ongoing events

- Coenraad Jacob Temminck Nouveau recueil de planches coloriées d'oiseaux Birds first described in this work in 1828 include the black-browed albatross, the comb-crested jacana and the tawny eagle
