= 1826 in birding and ornithology =

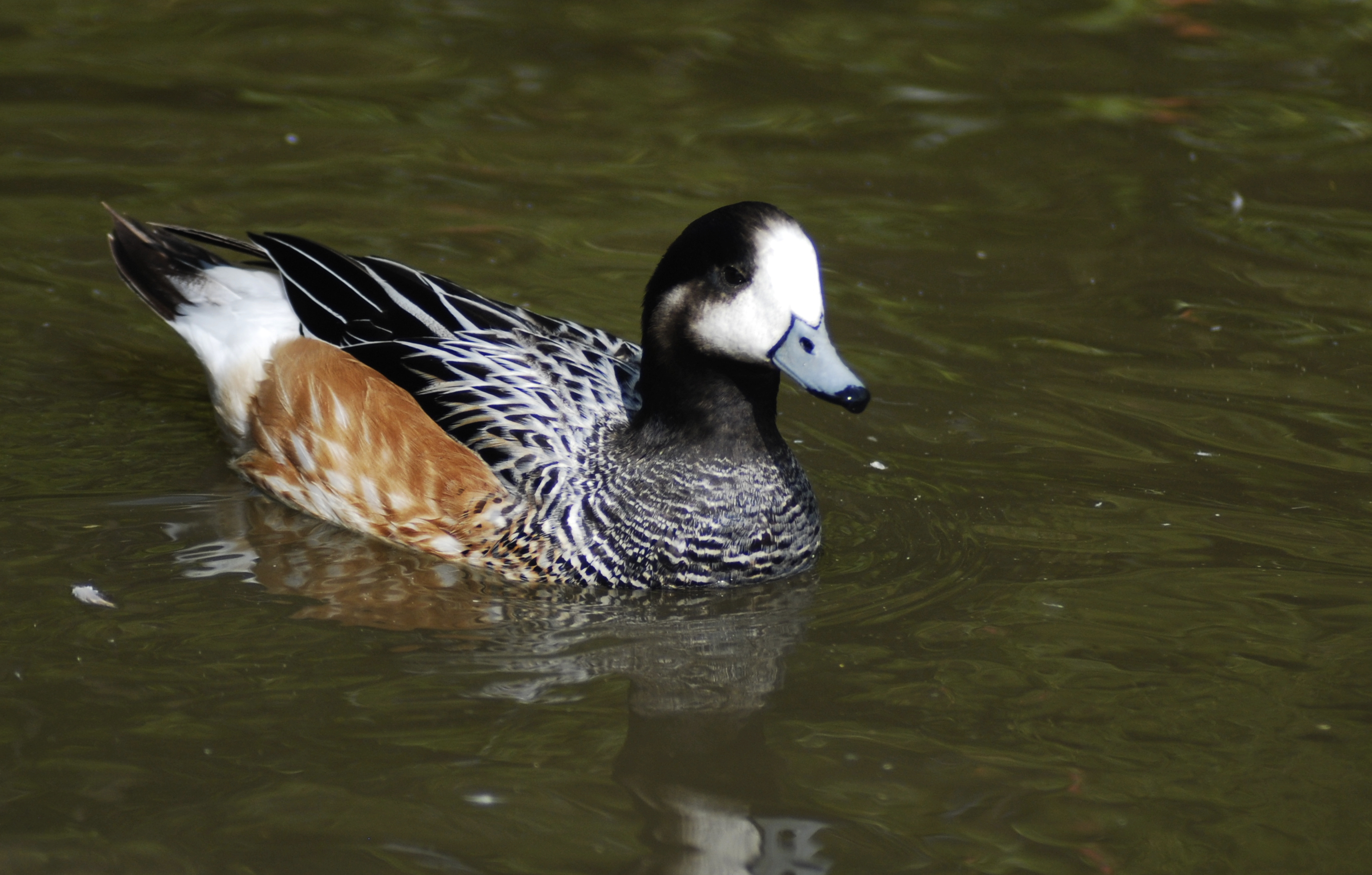
Chiloe wigeon. Described by Eduard Poeppig

- Death of Jean Baptiste Leschenault de la Tour
- Death of Gustaf von Paykull, an ornithological collector whose specimens are now held at the Swedish Museum of Natural History.
- Death of Johann Baptist von Spix, an explorer who helped to catalogue the birds of Brazil.
- Christian Ludwig Nitzsch publishes Anatomie der Vögel (Bird Anatomy) in Meckels Archiv für Anatomie und Physiologie
- Eduard Friedrich Poeppig begins scientific exploration throughout Chile, Peru and Brazil.
- Eduard Rüppell's "Atlas of Rüppell's Travels in Northern Africa" (1826–30) includes an ornithological section by Philipp Jakob Cretzschmar describing around thirty new species, including Meyer's parrot, Nubian bustard, goliath heron, streaked scrub warbler and Cretzschmar's bunting.
- Charles Payraudeau describes Audouin's gull discovered on an expedition to Corsica

Expeditions

- 1826-1829 Voyage of L'Astrolabe (French) to the Coast of Australia, New Zealand, Fiji and Loyalty Islands. Captain Jules Dumont d'Urville (1790–1842), Surgeon Naturalists Joseph Paul Gaimard (1796–1858) and Jean René Constant Quoy (1790–1869), Pharmacian-botanist : Pierre Adolphe Lesson (1805–1888).
- 1826-1829 Circumnavigation by the Seniavine Captain Fiodor Litke (1797–1882), Surgeon Naturalist Franz Carl Mertens (1764–1831), Naturalist Heinrich von Kittlitz (1799–1874), Mineralogist Alexander Postels.
- Paul-Émile Botta selected to be the naturalist on a voyage around the world on Le Heros under Captain Auguste Bernard Duhaut-Cilly (1790–1849)

Ongoing events

- Coenraad Jacob Temminck Nouveau recueil de planches coloriées d'oiseaux Birds first described in this work in 1826 include the white-throated nightjar, the checker-throated woodpecker, the great-billed kingfisher, the spectacled monarch, the Cuban green woodpecker and the Sunda thrush
