= 1834 in birding and ornithology =

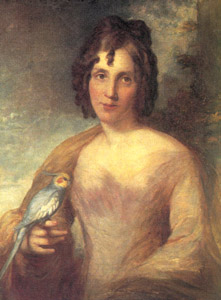
Elizabeth Gould

- Elizabeth Gould collaborates with Edward Lear in illustrating A Monograph of the Ramphastidae
- 1834-1835 Charles Coxen travels through the sparsely settled country between the Hunter and Namoi Rivers, including the Liverpool Plains, collecting specimens of birds and mammals.
- Permanent human settlement on Lord Howe Island begins the extinction of the Lord Howe swamphen or white gallinule, white-throated pigeon, red-crowned parakeet and the Tasman booby.
- Franz Meyen describes species then new to science such as the Humboldt penguin and the mountain caracara
- Thomas Nuttall publishes Volume 2 (and last) of Manual of the Ornithology of the United States and of Canada (1832 and 1834)
- Constantin Wilhelm Lambert Gloger publishes Vollständiges Handbuch der Naturgeschichte der Vögel Europas
- Edward Smith-Stanley, 13th Earl of Derby withdraws from politics to concentrate on birds.
- Pink-footed goose described by Louis Antoine François Baillon in Mémoires de la Société Royale d'Émulation d'Abbeville

Ongoing events

- John James Audubon continues the publication of his serial work, Birds of America and the corresponding Ornithological Bibliography. New bird species described in this work in 1834 include Lincoln's sparrow (as Fringilla lincolnii, the Lincoln finch), the king rail (as fresh-water marsh hen), Swainson's warbler and the Carolina chickadee (as Parus carolinensis, the Carolina titmouse).
