= 1825 in birding and ornithology =

== Events ==
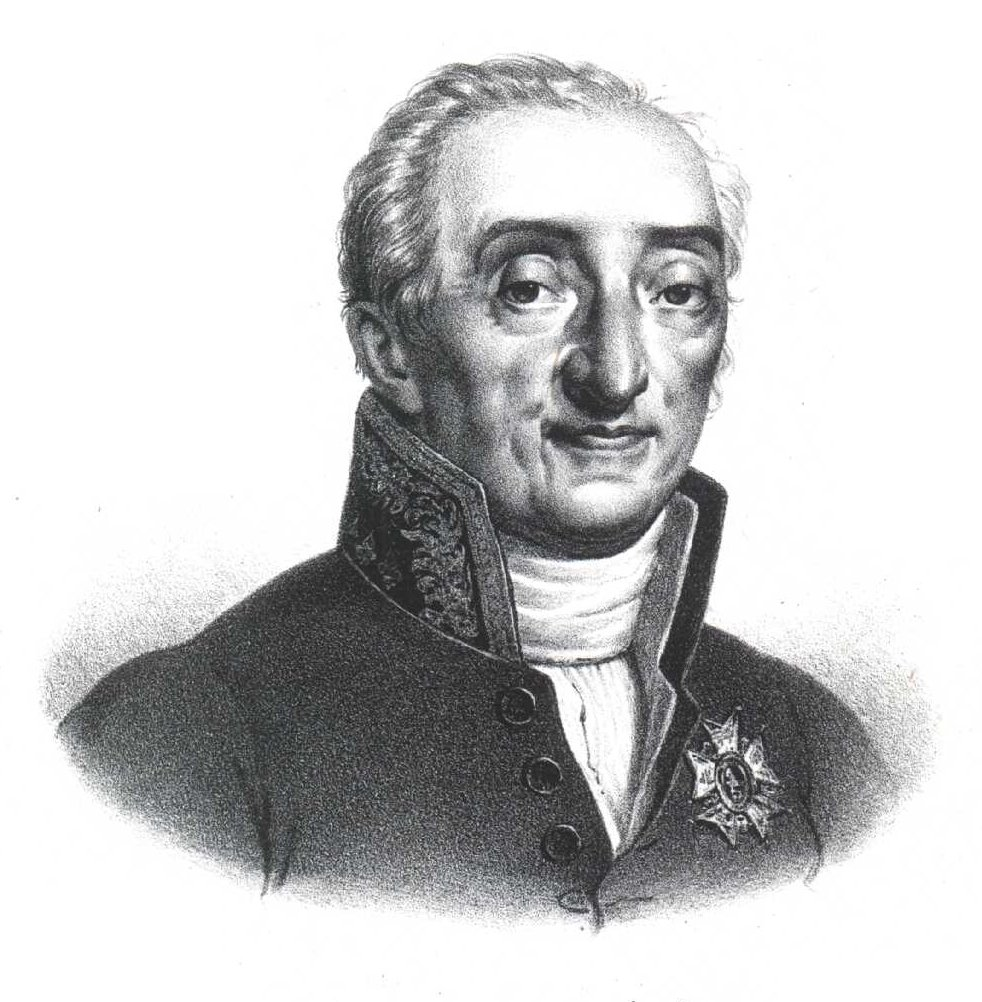
- Bernard Germain de Lacépède
  Death of Bernard Germain de Lacépède
- Charles Lucien Bonaparte updates Wilson's American Ornithology as American ornithology, or, The natural history of birds inhabiting the United States, not given by Wilson : with figures drawn, engraved, and coloured, from nature. He added more than 100 species.
- William Jardine and Prideaux John Selby commence the serial publication Illustrations of Ornithology (1825–1843).
- Lord Charles Somerset founds the South African Museum.
- Carl Peter Holbøll, who described synonyms of hoary redpoll and gyrfalcon, becomes Royal Inspector of Colonies and Whaling in South Greenland.
- The Bergen Museum is founded.

== Expeditions ==
- The voyage of HMS Blossom begins, and would last until 1828 after 3 years in Pacific Ocean. This expedition, under Frederick William Beechey, provided some of the first European descriptions of the birds of the Bonin Islands.

== Ongoing events ==
- 1824-1825 Johann Baptist von Spix Avium Species Novae Birds first described in this work in 1825 include the social flycatcher, the spot-winged wood-quail, the black-fronted piping-guan, the blue-crowned manakin, the razor-billed curassow, and the wattled curassow
