= 1824 in birding and ornithology =

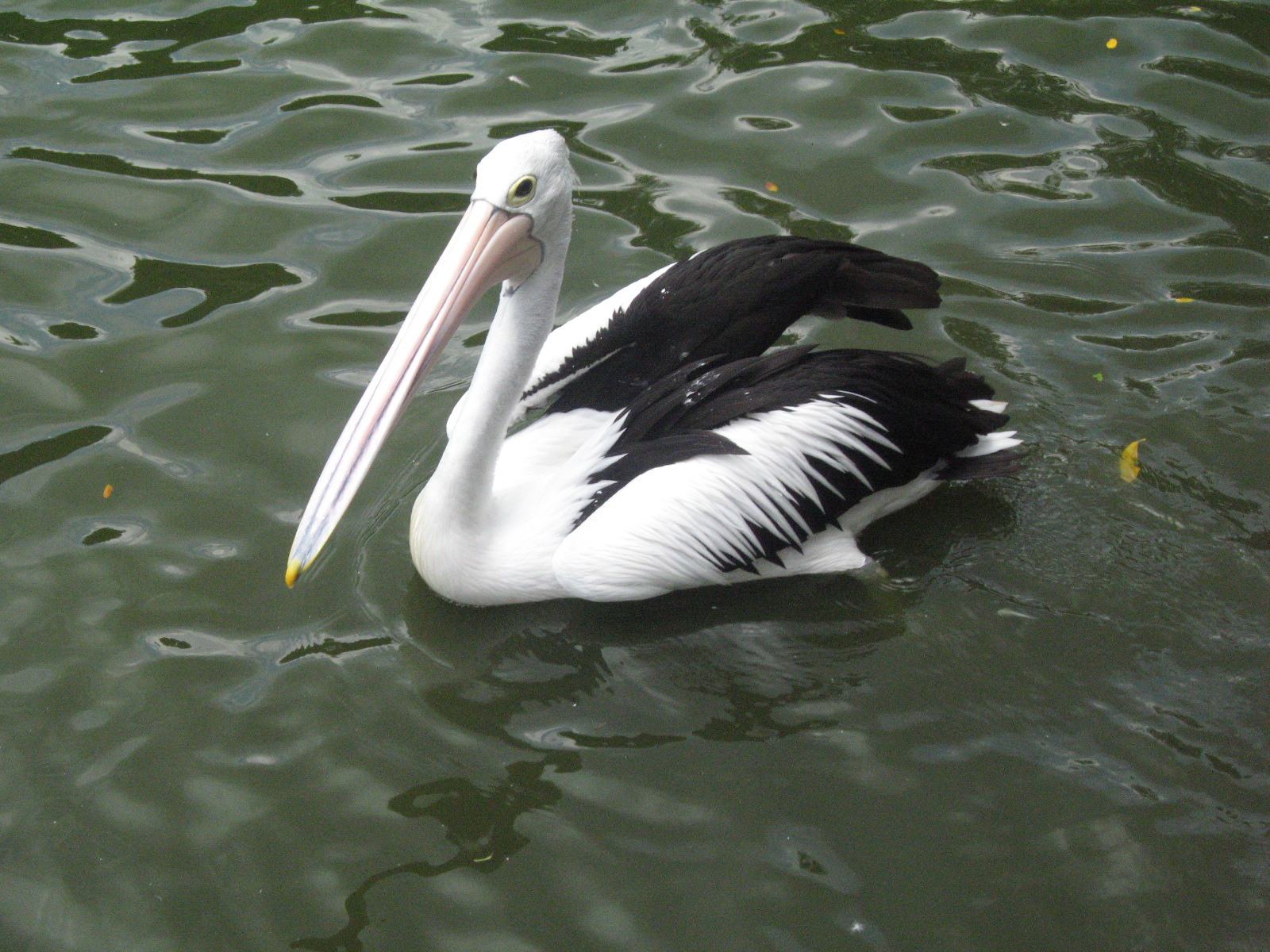
Australian pelican. This species was described by Louis Pierre Vieillot in 1824

- Death of François Levaillant
- Death of Blasius Merrem
- 1824–26 Voyage of the Blonde to the Pacific. The naturalist on board is Andrew Bloxam.
- Philipp Franz Balthasar von Siebold describes the Japanese waxwing in Historiae naturalis in Japonia statu
- Hermann Schlegel travels to Vienna in 1824 to attend the lectures of Leopold Fitzinger and Johann Jacob Heckel.
- Jean René Constant Quoy and Joseph Paul Gaimard describe the austral thrush and variable hawk in Voyage Autour du Monde Exécute sur l'Uranie et la Physicienne pendant les années 1817-1820
- 1824-1825 Johann Baptist von Spix Avium Species Novae published. In this work Spix proposes the genera Aratinga and Colibri
- 1824-1827 Christian Ludwig Brehm commences Ornis oder das neueste und Wichtigste der Vögelkunde the first ornithological journal.
- Death of Alfred Duvaucel collector for the Muséum national d'histoire naturelle

Expeditions

- 1824-26 Circumnavigation by the frigate "Le Thétis" and the corvette "L'Espérance" Hyacinthe de Bougainville (commander), Paul Anne de Norquer du Camper (captain of the Espérance), Edmond de La Touanne (lieutenant on the Thétis and artist), Francois Louis Busseuil (1791-1835 (surgeon and naturalist).

== Ongoing events ==
- Coenraad Jacob Temminck Nouveau recueil de planches coloriées d'oiseaux. Birds first described in this work include the scarlet-rumped trogon, the lilac kingfisher, the metallic starling, the red-throated barbet, the lizard buzzard, the red-bearded bee-eater and the Australian pelican
- Louis Pierre Vieillot continues La Galerie des Oiseaux du cabinet d'histoire naturelle du jardin du roi.
