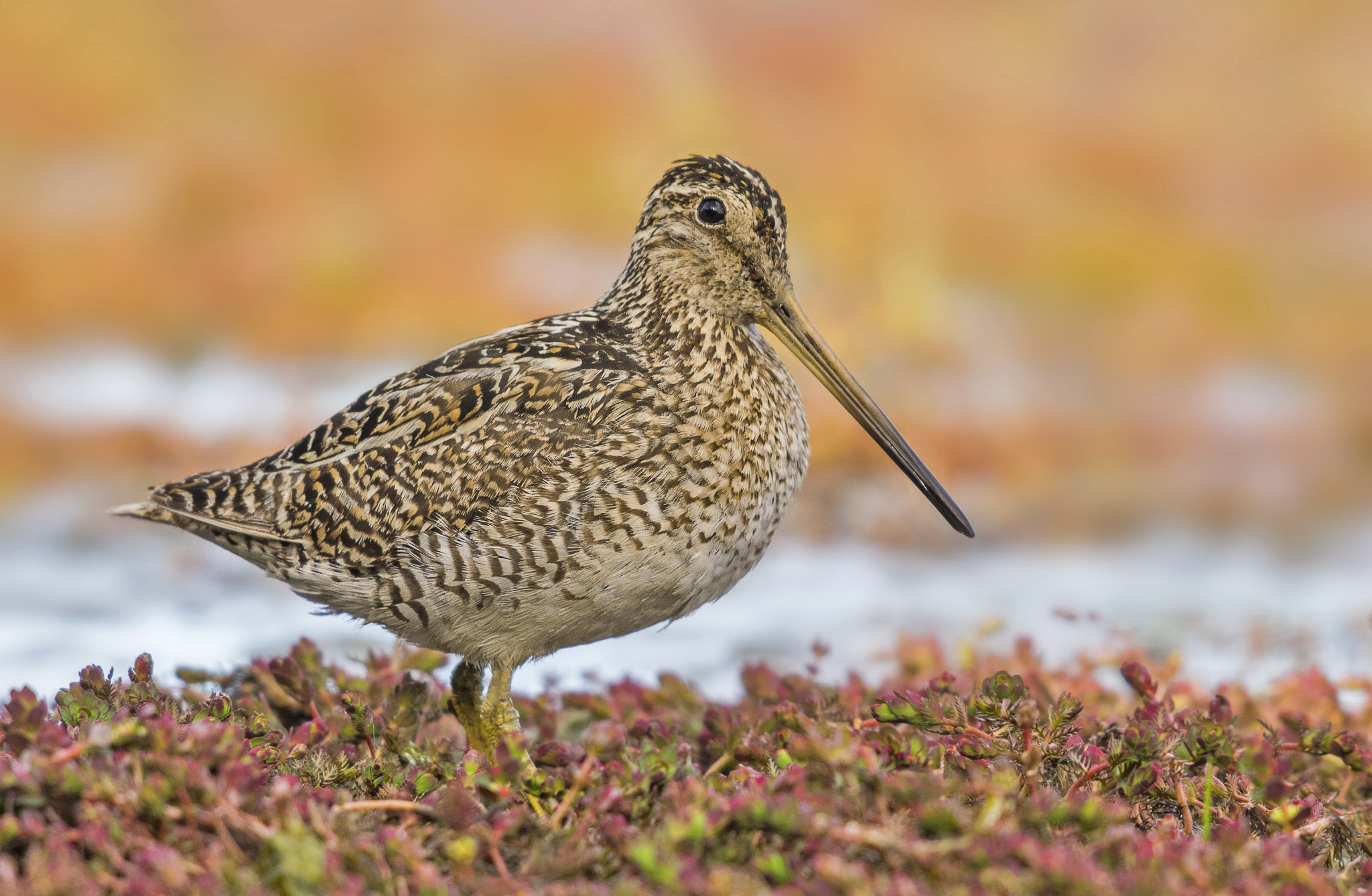

Conservation status
- Near Threatened (IUCN 3.1)

Scientific classification
- Kingdom: Animalia
- Phylum: Chordata
- Class: Aves
- Order: Charadriiformes
- Family: Scolopacidae
- Genus: Gallinago
- Species: G. stricklandii

Binomial name
- Gallinago stricklandii (Gray, 1845)

= Fuegian snipe =

Species of bird

The Fuegian snipe (Gallinago stricklandii) also known as the cordilleran snipe, is a small stocky wader. It breeds in south-central Chile and Argentina south to Tierra del Fuego. It is mainly sedentary, but the Tierra del Fuego population winters in mainland Chile.

It is sporadically recorded in the Falkland Islands, where it has reputedly bred. However, there is only one recent record and the historical documentation of breeding is a lost specimen of questionable identity. The occurrences in these islands could therefore be due to either a tiny breeding population or vagrancy from the mainland.

This species is common in Tierra del Fuego and decreasingly so farther north in its range. It is sometimes considered conspecific with Andean snipe, Gallinago jamesoni. The scientific name of the Fuegian snipe commemorates the English geologist, ornithologist and systematist, Hugh Edwin Strickland.

== Description ==
This 30–32 cm long snipe has a stocky body and relatively short legs for a wader. Its upperparts, head and neck are streaked and patterned with dark brown and buff, and gold edges to the feathers form lines down its back, which are not as sharply defined as in most snipe species.. The belly is buff with brown barring on the flanks. The horn-coloured bill is long, straight and fairly robust. The legs and feet are yellowish-green. The sexes are similar, and immature birds differ only in showing pale fringes on the wing coverts.

The Fuegian snipe makes a chip-chip-chip call, and has a sharp, far carrying char-woo in its display flight.

The only other snipe with an overlapping range is the Magellan snipe, Gallinago paraguiaiae. Compared with that species, Fuegian snipe is obviously larger, with a heavy woodcock-like flight on broad wings which lack a white trailing edge. On the ground, it lacks the clear pale stripes of its smaller relative.

== Behaviour ==
The Fuegian snipe is found in grassy and forested boggy areas with low scrub or rushes, at altitudes ranging from 4,200 m in the north of its down to nearly sea level in Tierra del Fuego, where it also occurs in unforested open grass and scrubby areas.

Little is known of its breeding biology, but it has a nocturnal aerial display, which involves flying high in circles, followed by a powerful stoop during which the bird makes a drumming sound, caused by vibrations of modified outer tail feathers. The drumming alternates with the char-woo call.

The Fuegian snipe forages by pushing its long bill deep into the mud seeking insects and worms. Its cryptic plumage provides effective camouflage when the bird stands motionless amongst marsh vegetation.

== Status ==
As of 2025, the Fuegian snipe has a population estimated at 2,500 – 9,999 mature individuals. There may be some declines in the north of its range, and this species has been classified as Near Threatened.
