= Moritz Balthasar Borkhausen =

German naturalist and forester (1760–1806)

Moritz Balthasar Borkhausen (3 December 1760, Giessen – 30 November 1806, Darmstadt) was a German naturalist and forester. He took part in the production of Teutsche Ornithologie oder Naturgeschichte aller Vögel Teutschlands in naturgetreuen Abbildungen und Beschreibungen by Johann Conrad Susemihl.

He received his education in Giessen, and in 1796 started work as an assessor at the forestry office in Darmstadt. In 1800, he attained the title of Kammerrat, followed by a role as counselor at the Oberforsthaus Collegium in 1804.

As a botanist, he was the taxonomic author of Alliaceae and Asclepiadaceae as well as the circumscriber of numerous plant genera and species.

== Works ==
- Naturgeschichte der europäischen Schmetterlinge (Natural history of European Lepidoptera) (1788–94).
- Versuch einer Erklärung der zoologischen Terminologie (An explanation of the zoological terminology) (1790).
- Versuch einer forstbotanischen Beschreibung der in Hessen-Darmstädter Landen im Freien wachsenden Holzarten (Description of the woody plants growing in Hesse-Darmstadt) (1790).
- Tentamen dispositionis plantarum Germaniae seminiferarum secundum new fact methodum A staminum situ proportione, (1792).
- Batsch, August Johann Georg Karl (1793–1794). Synopsis vniversalis analytica genervm plantarvm fere omnivm hvcvsque cognitorum qvam secvndvm methodvm sexvalem corollinam, et carpologicam adivnctis ordinibvs naturalibvs adhibitis vltra Linnaeana monitis et adavctionibvs meritissimorvm Avbletii, Lovreirii, Forskolii, Thvnbergii, Forsteri, Vahlii, Gaertneri, Hedwigii, Schreberi, Ivssievii, Swarzii, et aliorum. 2 vols (in Latin). Ienae: Svmtibvs Bibliopolii Croekeriani.*Theoretisch-praktisches Handbuch der Forstbotanik und Forsttechnologie (Manual of forest technology) (1800–1803).
- Deutsche Ornithologie oder Naturgeschichte aller Vögel Deutschlands (Natural history of German birds) (1810).

== Bibliography ==
- Robert Zander; Fritz Encke, Günther Buchheim, Siegmund Seybold (Hrsg.): Handwörterbuch der Pflanzennamen. 13.Auflage. Ulmer Verlag, Stuttgart 1984, ISBN 3-8001-5042-5.
