= 1831 in birding and ornithology =

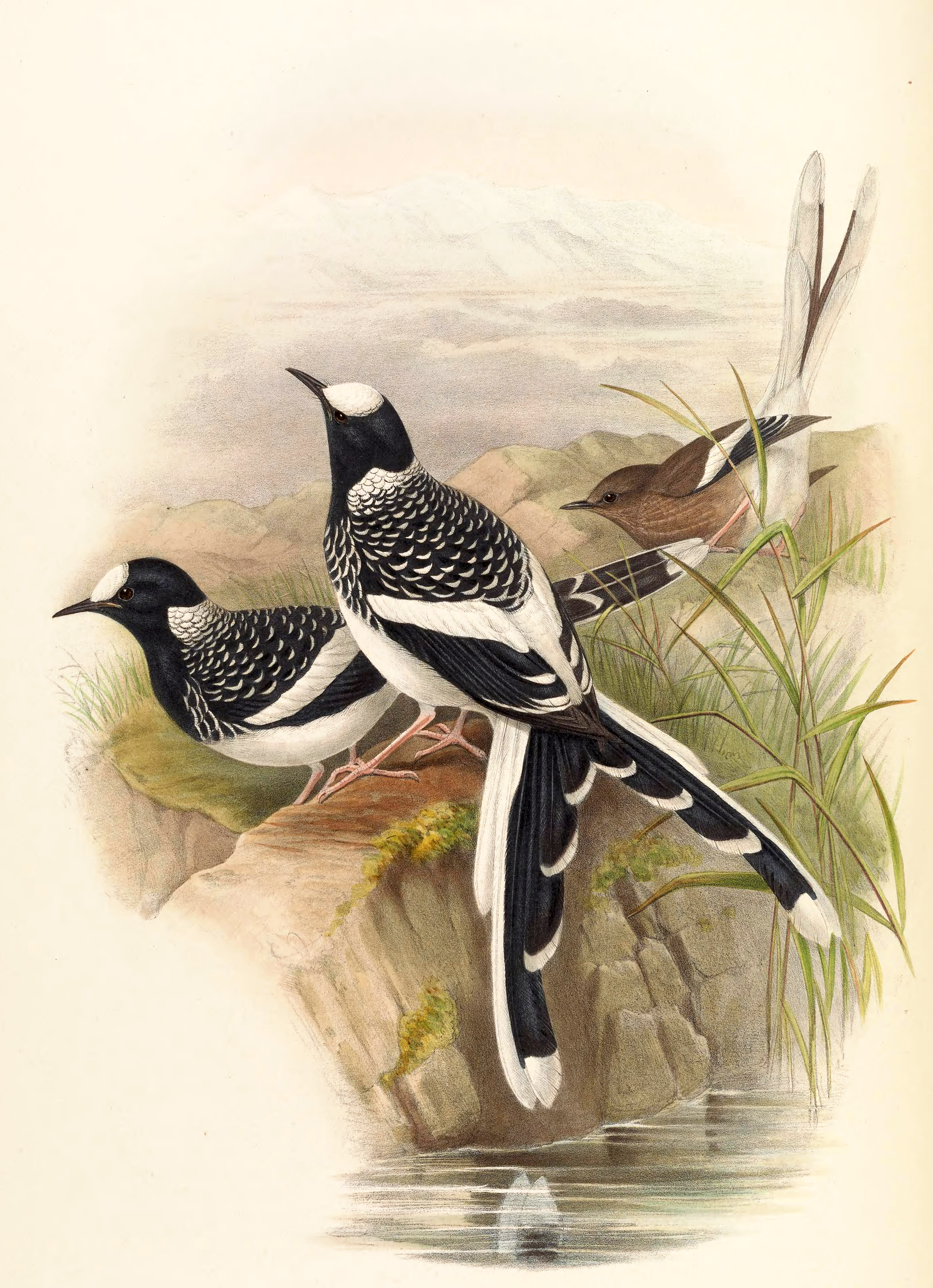
Enicurus maculatus, the spotted forktail was described by Nicholas Aylward Vigors in 1831

- Death of Louis Pierre Vieillot
- Christian Ludwig Brehm publishes Handbuch der Naturgeschichte alle Vögel Deutschlands
- Second voyage of HMS Beagle commences
- Adolphe Delattre makes the first of several trips to South America.
- Johann Friedrich von Brandt appointed director of the Zoological Department at the St Petersburg Academy of Sciences
- Nicholas Aylward Vigors describes the great Indian bustard
- "Maison Deyrolle" established in Paris.
