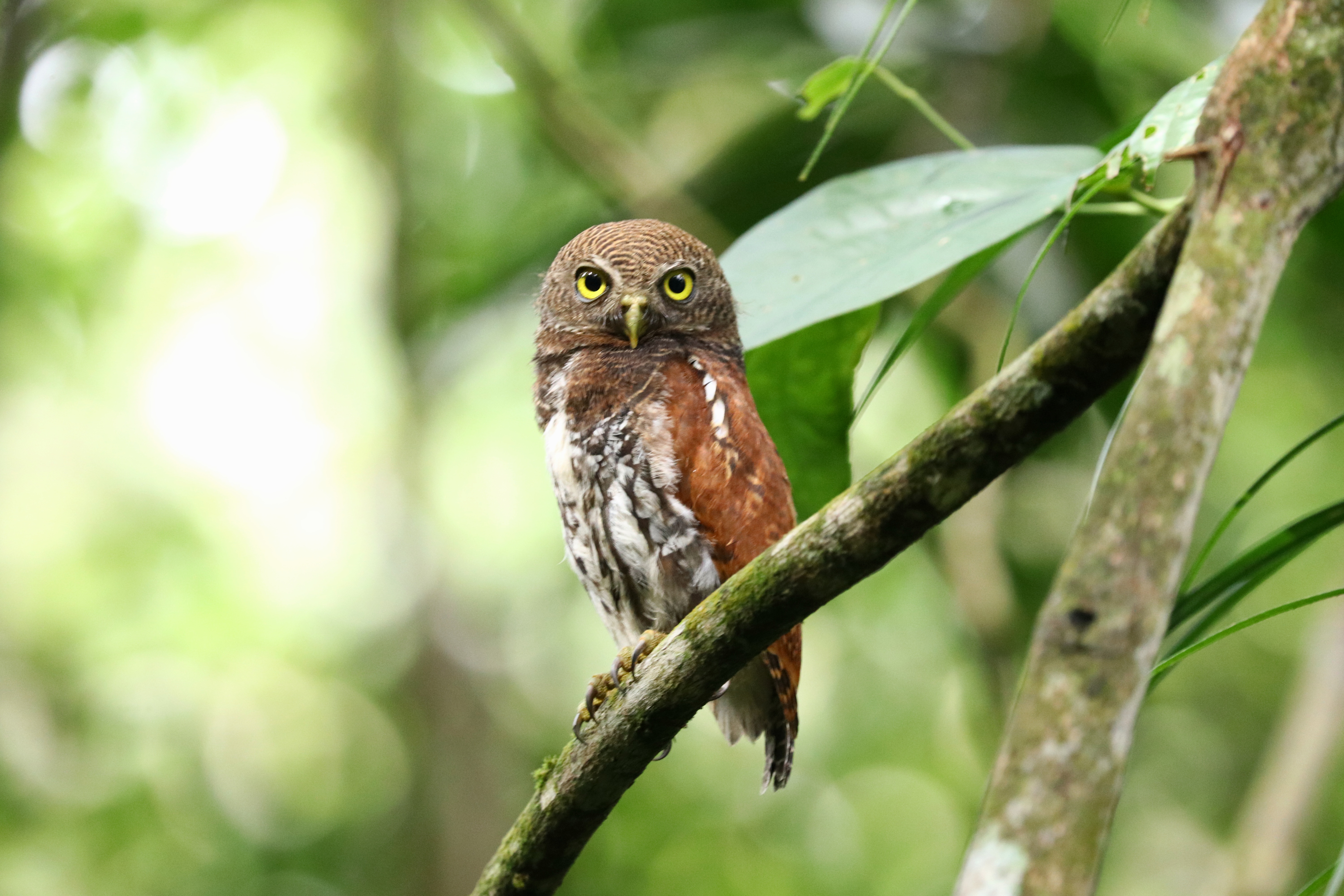

Conservation status
- Near Threatened (IUCN 3.1)
- CITES Appendix II

Scientific classification
- Kingdom: Animalia
- Phylum: Chordata
- Class: Aves
- Order: Strigiformes
- Family: Strigidae
- Genus: Glaucidium
- Species: G. castanotum

Binomial name
- Glaucidium castanotum (Blyth, 1851)
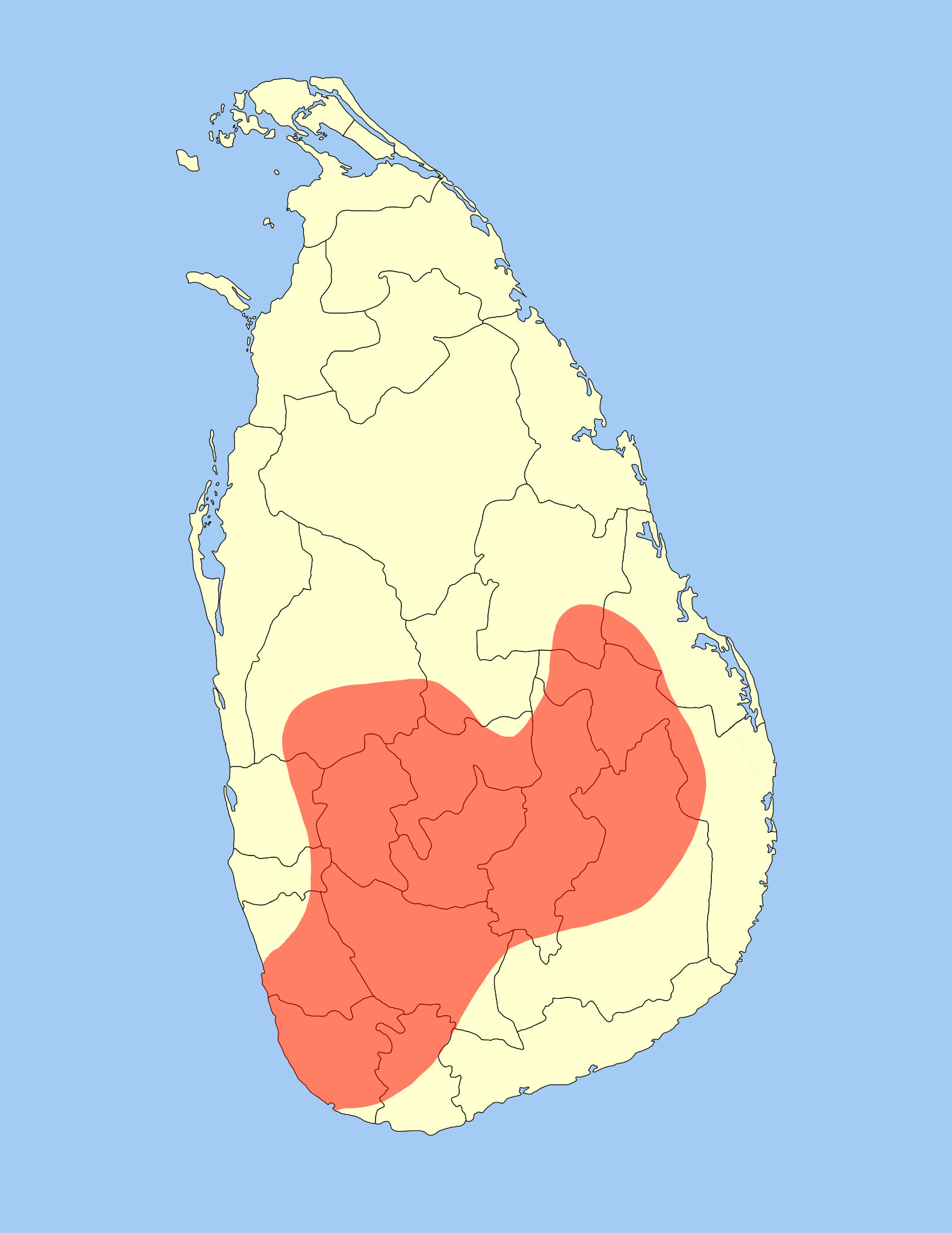
- Range of G. castanotum Resident

Synonyms
- Glaucidium radiatum castanonotum

= Chestnut-backed owlet =

Species of owl

The chestnut-backed owlet (Glaucidium castanotum) (often misspelled Glaucidium castanonotum), is an owl which is endemic to Sri Lanka. This species is a part of the larger grouping of owls known as typical owls, Strigidae, which contains most of the smaller owl species. This species was formerly considered to be a subspecies of the jungle owlet.

== Description ==
The chestnut-backed owlet is small and stocky, measuring 19 cm (7.5 in) in length. It resembles the jungle owlet in shape, size and appearance but the upperparts, scapulars and wing coverts are mainly chestnut brown, with darker barring. The underparts are white with blackish shaft-streaks. The facial disc is mainly brown and the eyes are yellow. There is a white neckband. Sexes are similar in appearance, with no sexual dimorphism.

== Distribution and habitat ==
The chestnut-backed owlet is a common resident bird in the wet zone forests of Sri Lanka, and can be seen easily at sites such as Kitulgala and Sinharaja. Historical reports of its distribution by Legge include many parts of the southern half of Sri Lanka, especially the hills and the wet-zone low country extending to the outskirts of Colombo. In recent times, its range has shrunk greatly, and it is now found sparingly in the remaining forests of the wet zone and the adjoining hills at altitudes of up to 6,500 ft (2,000 m) above sea level.

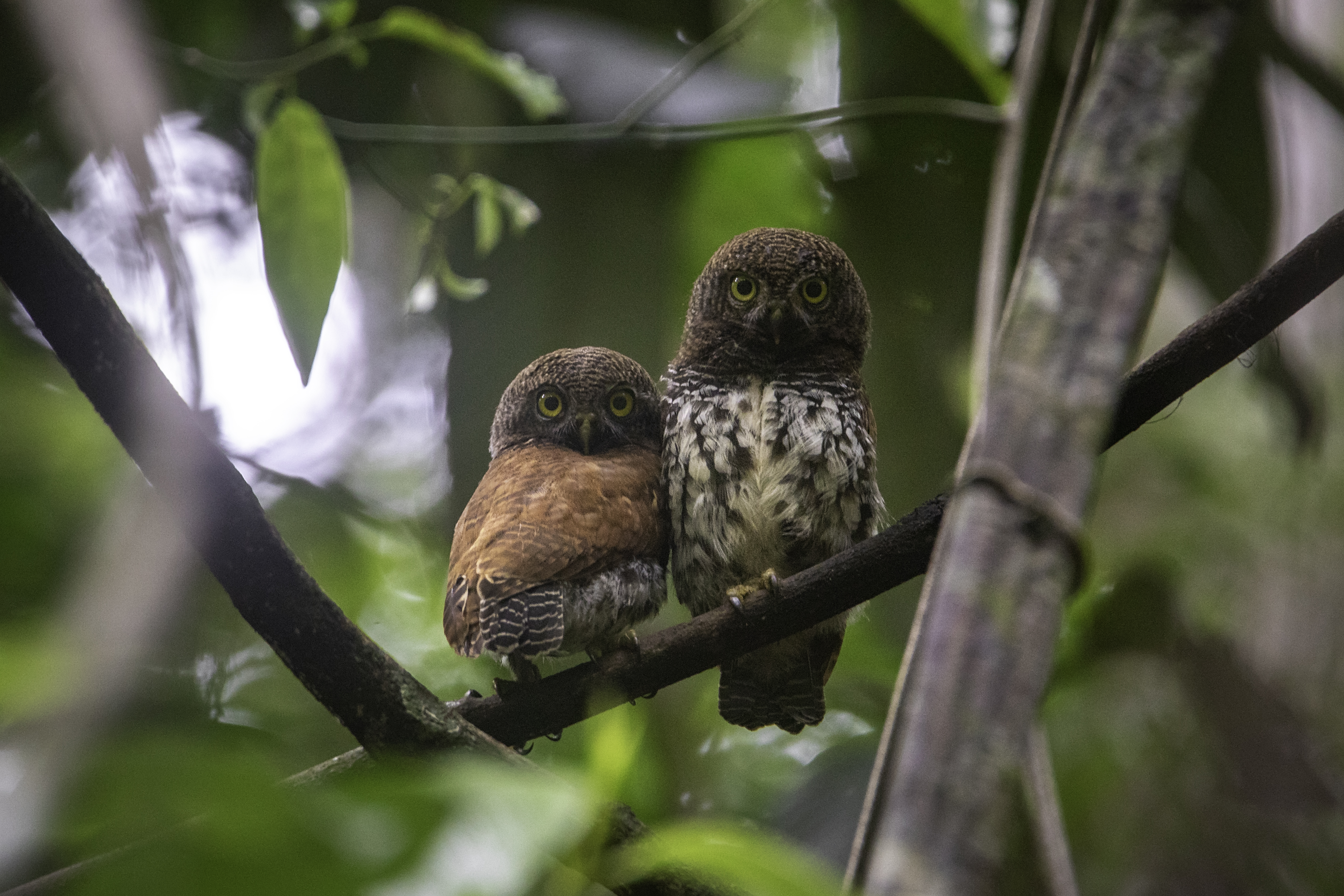

== Behaviour ==
This species is diurnal and is frequently seen in the day, especially in the evening. The flight is deeply undulating. It can often be located by the small birds that mob it while it is perched in a tree. It frequents tops of tall trees, usually on steep hill-sides and hence is often missed. It feeds mainly on insects, such as beetles, but also captures mice, small lizards, and small birds mostly when the young are being fed. The call is a slow kraw-kraw and carries for a long distance. It nests in a hole in a tree, laying two eggs.

== In culture ==
In Sri Lanka, this bird is known as Pitathabala Vana-Bassa (පිටතඔල වන බස්සා in Sinhala).
