= 1829 in birding and ornithology =

- The Trocaz pigeon is first described by Karl Heineken.
- Death of Juan Ignacio Molina, who provided the first European account of the birds of Chile, describing thirty-three species.
- Death of Jean-Baptiste Lamarck, who was an early proponent of evolution, though his proposed mechanisms were largely incorrect.
- Auguste Drapiez publishes Résumé d'ornithologie ou d'histoire naturelle des oiseaux
- Johann Georg Wagler writes descriptions of new bird species in Isis, oder Encyclopädische Zeitung published by Lorenz Oken Some are: the russet-throated puffbird, the golden-fronted woodpecker, the pinnated bittern, the chestnut-colored woodpecker, the brown jay, the intermediate egret and the ladder-backed woodpecker
- George Ord retires from business to devote his time to ornithology.
- 1829-33 Admiral Sir Edward Belcher "Aetna " survey expedition to North and West Africa.
- Julien François Desjardins, Charles Telfair, Wenceslas Bojer, and Jacques Delisse, take part in founding the Société d'Histoire Naturelle de l'Île Maurice
