= 1980s in birding and ornithology =

The years 1980–1989 in birding and ornithology.

== Worldwide ==
=== New species ===
Bird species new to science described in the 1980s

=== Ornithologists ===
==== Deaths ====
1985

- 22 February - David Hunt (born 1934) – ″The Scilly Birdman″

1987

- 11 September - Sir Charles Alexander Fleming died at age 71 (born 9 September 1916).

== World listing ==
=== Breeding birds ===
1981

- Cranes bred in Britain (Norfolk Broads) for the first time in over 400 years

=== Rare birds ===
1981

- Europe's first magnolia warbler on St Agnes, Isles of Scilly.

1982

- Britains first northern harrier on the Isles of Scilly from 22 October 1982 until 8 June 1983

1983

- Britain's first white-throated robin in June 1983 at the Calf of Man Bird Observatory.

1984

- Britain's second common yellowthroat found on 7 June 1984 at Fetlar, Shetland.
- Britain's third common yellowthroat found on 2 October 1984 at Bryher.
- Britain's second hermit thrush found on 28 October 1984 at Peninnis Head, St Mary's.

1985

- Europe's first Wilson's warbler found on 13 October at Rame Head, Cornwall.
- Britain's third calandra lark found on St Mary's, Isles of Scilly (first record for the islands) on 26 April and stayed until 29 April.

1988

- Britain's first accepted record of a brown-headed cowbird at Islay, Argyll on 24 April
- Britain's first accepted record of a double-crested cormorant at Cleveland from December 1988 to late April 1989.

1990

- Western Palearctic's first tree swallow at Porth Hellick, St Mary's, Isles of Scilly from 6 to 11 June
- Britain's second white-throated robin on 27 May 1990 at Skokholm, Pembrokeshire.

=== Portugal ===
==== Rare birds ====
1984

- Eight great blue herons reached the Azores in April and a ninth in June. These birds are not considered to be the first for Europe. (See France, 1996).
