= 1835 in birding and ornithology =

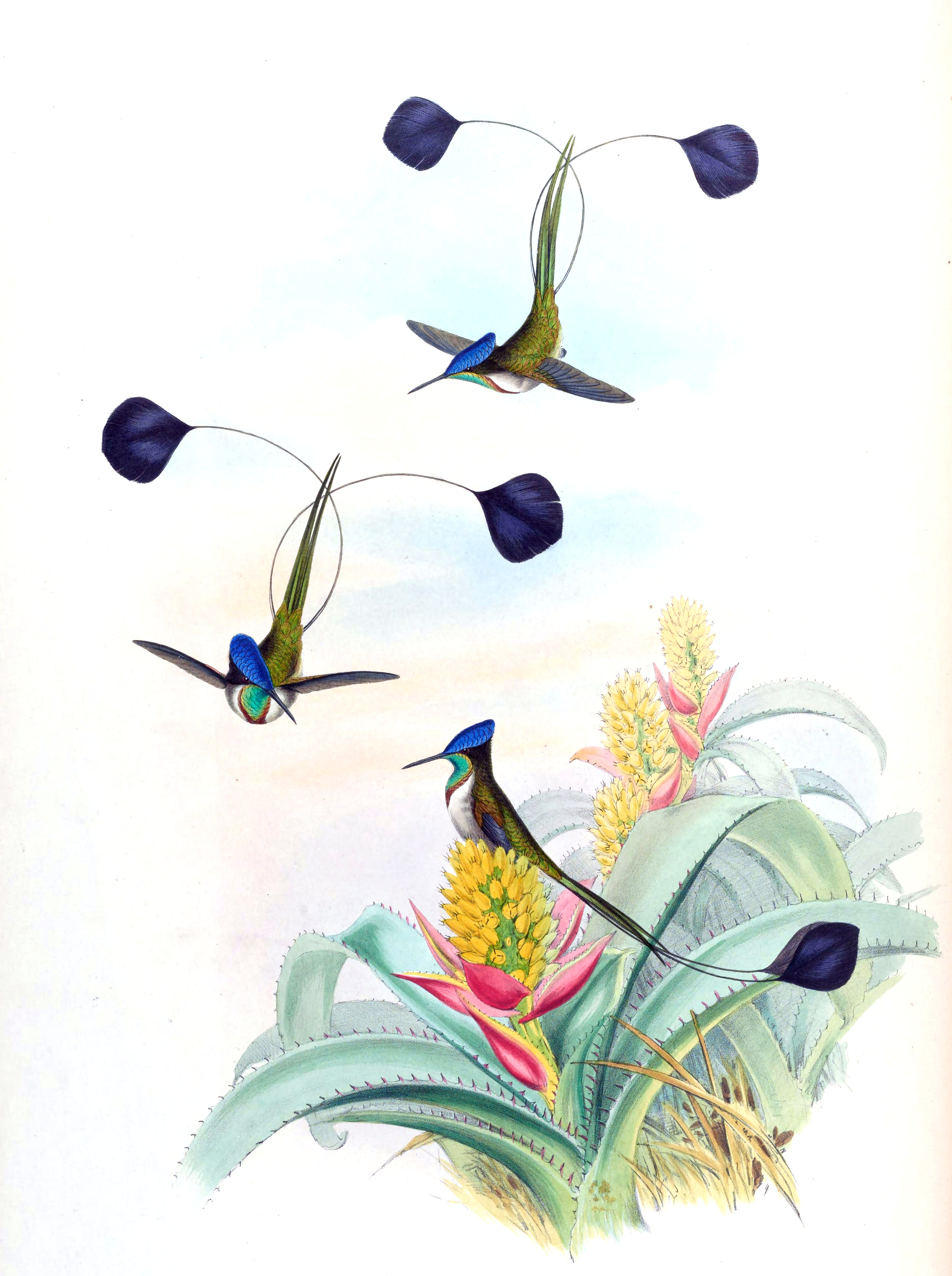
The marvellous spatuletail was first reported in 1835 by Andrew Matthews bird collector for George Loddiges

- The Beagle lands at the Galápagos Islands and Charles Darwin collects the finches which bear his name.
- Carl Jakob Sundevall develops a phylogeny for the birds in Lärobok i zoologien (Handbook of Zoology). This is based on the muscles of the hip and leg.
- Frédéric de Lafresnaye describes the magpie mannikin and the cactus wren in Revue et magasin de zoologie (founded by Félix Édouard Guérin-Méneville.)
- Death of Alexander Collie
- Death of Carl Wilhelm Hahn
- Alexander von Nordmann describes spotted redshank in Reise um die erde durch Nord-Asien und die beiden oceane in den jahren 1828, 1829 und 1830 ausgeführt
- 1835-1839 Philip Barker Webb, Sabin Berthelot and Alfred Moquin-Tandon begin L'Histoire Naturelle des Îles Canaries published in Paris
- Charles Thorold Wood publishes The Ornithological Guide.
- Thomas Barwick Lloyd Baker publishes An Ornithological Index.
