= Wilhem de Haan =

Dutch zoologist

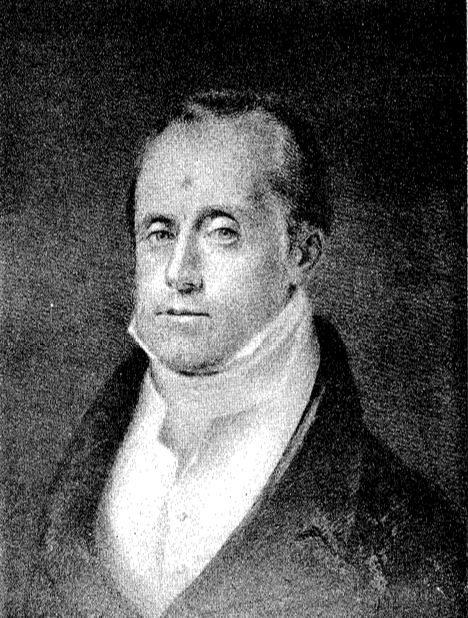
Image of Wilhem de Haan

Wilhem de Haan (7 February 1801 in Amsterdam – 15 April 1855 in Leiden) was a Dutch zoologist. He specialised in the study of insects and crustaceans, including aquatic arthropods, and was the first keeper of invertebrates at the Rijksmuseum in Leiden, now Naturalis. He was forced to retire in 1846, when he was partially paralysed by a spinal disease. He was responsible for the invertebrate volume of Siebold's Fauna Japonica, which was published in 1833, and introduced the western world for the first time to Japanese wildlife. He named a great many new taxa, and several taxa are named in his honour.

He published significant work on both mantids and phasmids (1842).
