= Johann Conrad Susemihl =

German copperplate engraver and artist

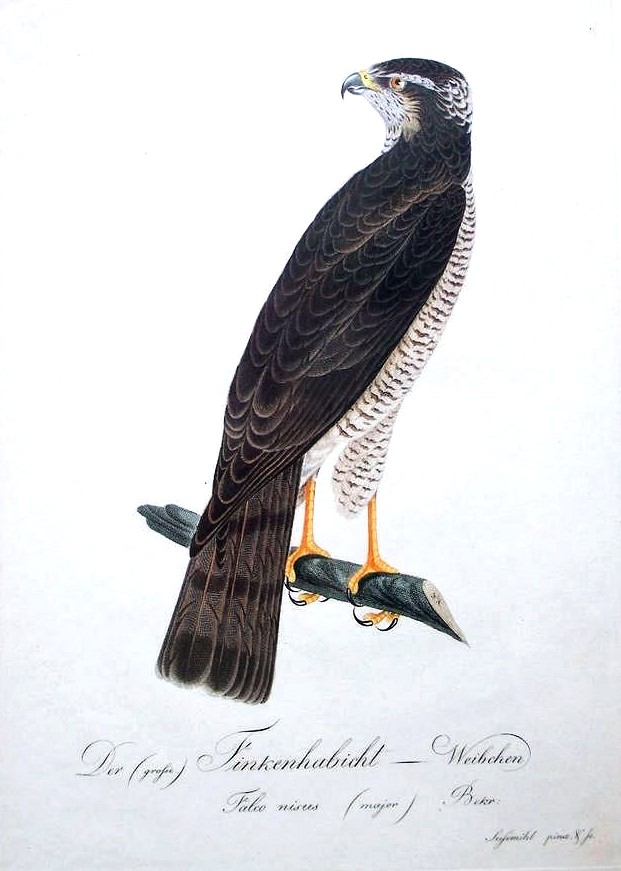
Eurasian sparrowhawk from Susemihl's Teutsche Ornithologie

Johann Conrad Susemihl (1767 Rainrod, Oberhessen – 1846), was a German copperplate engraver and artist noted for his images of natural history, landscapes and architecture.

Susemihl is acclaimed for his survey of the birds of Germany, Teutsche Ornithologie oder Naturgeschichte aller Vögel Teutschlands in naturgetreuen Abbildungen und Beschreibungen in 22 parts between 1800 and 1817, which was produced to rival the sumptuously illustrated books on birds that were being published in Europe at that time, such as those by François Le Vaillant. The work was a collective project by a team of ornithologists. Material for the plates came from local Darmstadt hunters and authorities on natural history, such as the naturalist Moritz Balthasar Borkhausen. Johann Conrad Susemihl directed and executed the drawing, etching, engraving and hand-colouring, assisted by his children Eduard and Emilie, his brother Johann Theodor Susemihl (1772-1848), H. Curtmann and E. F. Lichthammer. The work includes engravings of many raptors - eagles, hawks, falcons and owls, and even the images of the smaller species are rendered with fine detail, males and females of many of the species being depicted. The text describes the bird's physical form, habitat, food and nesting.

Susemihl also produced the plates for the seven volume series Allgemeine Naturgeschichte für alle Stände by the great German naturalist and mystic, Lorenz Oken, and published in Stuttgart by Hoffman between 1839 and 1841.

Another work which he illustrated was Strom-Karte und Profile von dem Rhein in der Gegend des Siebengebirge [Current map and profiles of the Rhine in the area of the Sieben Mountains]. Written by Carl Friedrich Wiebeking (1762-1842), a government hydraulic engineer and author of a number of books, it depicts the course of the Rhine from Remagen to Bonn.
