= Fauna Japonica =

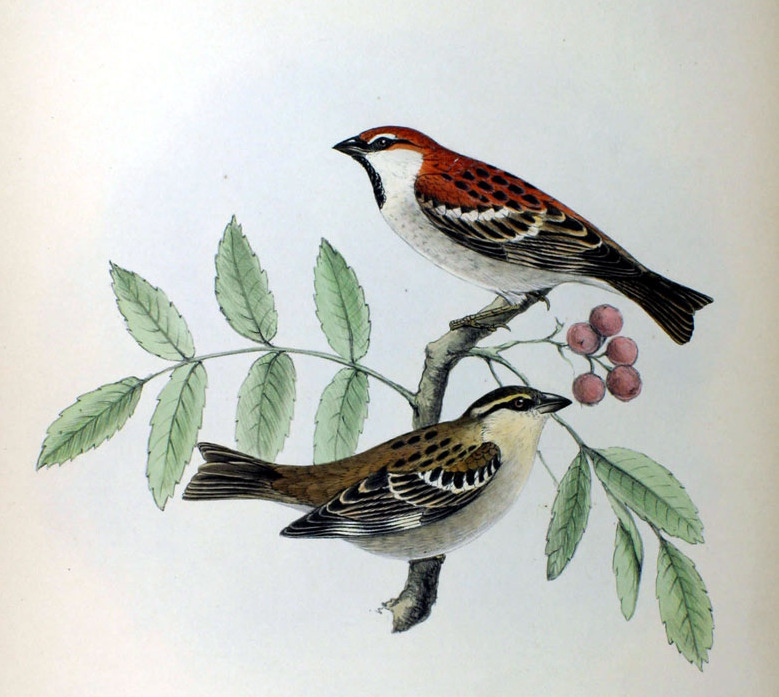
- An illustration of a russet sparrow pair from the Fauna Japonica
- Publication date: 1833

Fauna Japonica is a series of monographs on the zoology of Japan. It was the first book written in a European language (French) on the Japanese fauna, and published serially in five volumes between 1833 and 1850.

The full title is Fauna Japonica sive Descriptio animalium, quae in itinere per Japoniam, jussu et auspiciis superiorum, qui summum in India Batava imperium tenent, suscepto, annis 1825–1830 collegit, notis, observationibus et adumbrationibus illustravit Ph. Fr. de Siebold. Conjunctis studiis C. J. Temminck et H. Schlegel pro vertebratis atque W. de Haan pro invertebratis elaborata.

Based on the collections made by Philipp Franz von Siebold (who edited the text) and his successor Heinrich Bürger in Japan, Fauna Japonica's vertebrate volumes were authored by the Leyden Museum naturalists Coenraad Jacob Temminck and Hermann Schlegel. Wilhem de Haan, also at the Leyden museum, wrote the invertebrate volumes assisted by the Japanese artist naturalists Keiga Kawahara, Kurimoto Masayoshi and others. The volumes were a rare chance for European naturalists to learn about the wildlife in isolationist Japan.

Contents of Fauna Japonica
Volume	Title
I	Crustacea
II	Pisces
I I	Reptilia
IV	Aves
V	Mamalia

== Publication ==
The 5 volumes that make up Fauna Japonica were published by P. F. von Siebold and Lugduni Batavorum between 1833 and 1850. Originally intended to include all Japanese fauna, the published volumes pertain to Vertebrates and Crustacea only. Though a lot of the content was based on his own collections of specimen, von Siebold was the editor and publisher, not the writer of Fauna Japonica. C. J. Temminck and H. Schlegel authored the Vertebrata volumes, for which von Siebold did write an introduction, and W. de Haan wrote the volume on the Crustacea. While an 1849 letter between Temminck, then director of the Leiden Museum, and the Netherlands Ministry of Internal Affairs, indicates that J. A. Herklots studied the other invertebrates in von Siebold's collection, no volume of his was published in this series.

=== Dating difficulties ===
The publication of the each volume was done in the form of several fascicles called "Decades" over many years. This process poses many problems for modern scientists trying to keep track of the nomenclature of Japanese wildlife, because both text and plates often introduced nomenclature and described new taxa with inconsistent priority. For example, the volume devoted to bird, "Aves", was published in 12 livraisons ("deliveries" in French). The problem is of special concern for de Haan's Crustacea volume, in which many new genera and species were described. The problem arises because of uncertain dating on each component of these volumes. For a sense of how widely dispersed in time the publication of even a single volume can be, the following table records the different dates of publication for the different "Decades" of the first volume of Fauna Japonica, Crustacea.

Dating the Crustacea Volume's Fascicles
Deca	Publication year
I	1833
II	1835
III	1837
IV	1839
V	1841

== Reception ==
Fauna Japonica was considered important for its comprehensiveness, specifically of relevance to carcinologists. The Crustacea volume especially is consulted by those researching Decapods and Stomatopods. The work was influential on Philipp Franz von Siebold's reputation as a scientist in Europe and Japan. Numerous reprints and facsimiles have been issued since, some including unpublished artwork by collaborator Keiga Kawahara. Von Siebold's collection is now housed at the Horus Botanicus Leiden, the botanical garden in Leiden.
