= 1902 in birding and ornithology =

- Years in birding and ornithology: 1899 1900 1901 1902 1903 1904 1905
- Centuries: 19th century · 20th century · 21st century
- Decades: 1870s 1880s 1890s 1900s 1910s 1920s 1930s
- Years: 1899 1900 1901 1902 1903 1904 1905

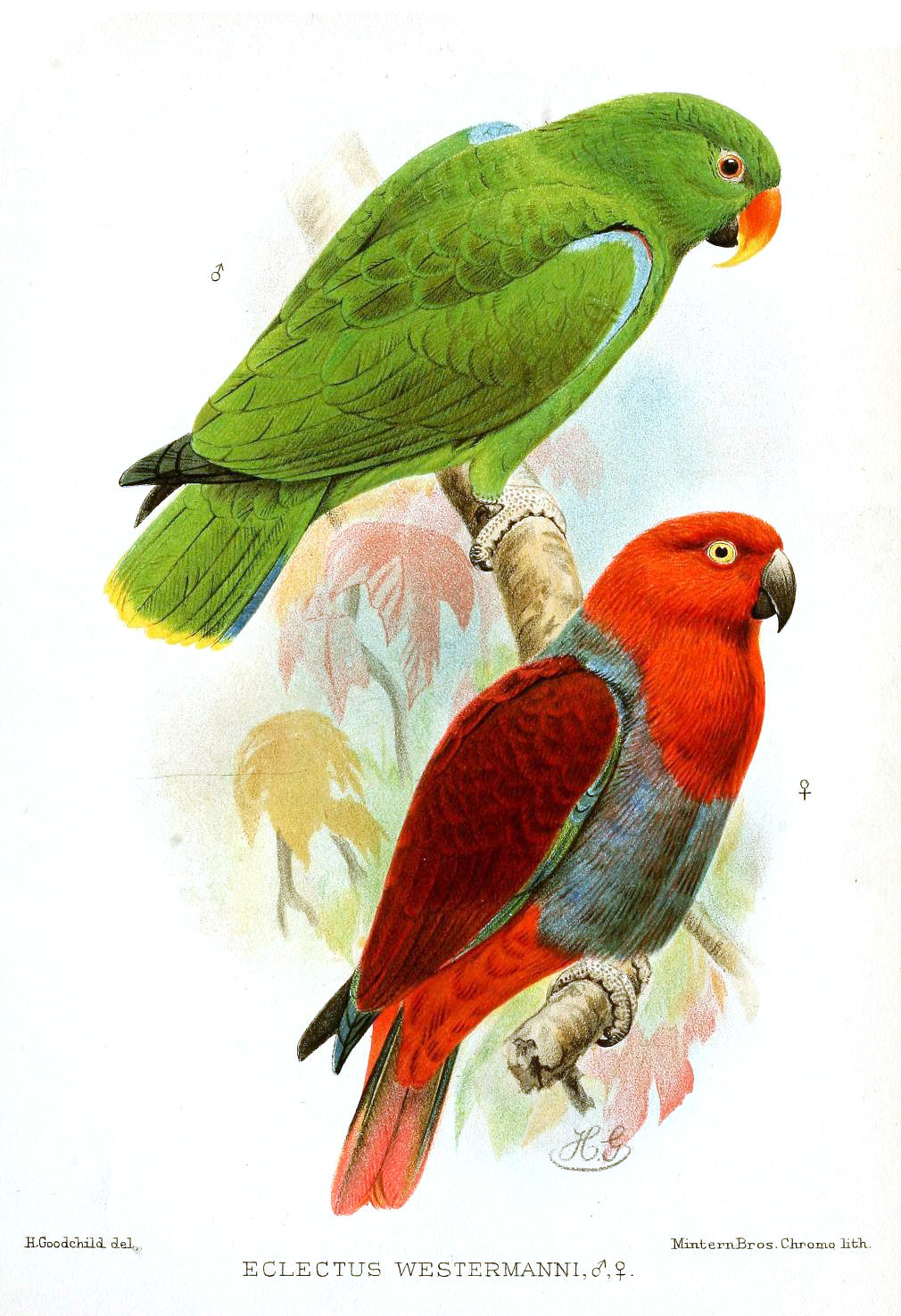
Westerman's Eclectus Parrot Proceedings of the Zoological Society of London 1902

- Birds described in 1902 include American black duck, Archer's ground robin, Great Nicobar serpent eagle, black-chested tyrant, Mussau fantail, Blanford's lark, Arabian serin, Cherrie's antwren, Isthmian wren, red-throated alethe,

== Events ==
- Death of Andreas Reischek, Chester Barlow, Ludwig Kumlien
- Philip Sclater supports Michael John Nicoll's membership of the British Ornithologists' Union
- Alwin Karl Haagner begins publishing in The Ibis

== Publications ==
- Sergei Buturlin Waders of the Russian Empire. Kuliki Rossieskoi Imperie—Premiya-k-Journal -Psovaia i Rujeinaia.Ohota.Tula, 1902.
- Joseph Grinnell Pacific Coast Avifauna.—No.3. Check-list of Californian Birds. By Joseph Grinnell. Cooper Ornithological Club of California. Santa Clara, June 1902. Roy. 8vo. 98 pp.
- William Robert Ogilvie-Grant A Review of the Species of Shrikes of the Genus Lanius. Nov. Zool. ix. p. 449.
- Karl Alfred von Zittel Text-book of Palaeontology vol. ii. English edition, translated and edited by Charles E. Eastman, Ph.D. Vol. II. London :Macmillan.online BHL
- Valentin Bianchi Ornitologisclieskie roaterialui expeditzi dla naooschno-promislnvago izsladomanya Murmana 1899–1901. [Ornithological Materials of the Expedition for the Scientific-industrial Exploration of Murman in 1899–1901.] Ann. Mus. Zool. Acad. Imp. Sci. de St. Petersbourg, vii. 1902.
- Robert Ridgway, 1902-1919 [1941, 1946] The birds of North and Middle America : a descriptive catalogue of the higher groups, genera, species, and subspecies of birds known to occur in North America, from the Arctic lands to the Isthmus of Panama, the West Indies and other islands of the Caribbean sea, and the Galapagos Archipelago Washington Govt. Print. Off. online BHL

Ongoing events

- Osbert Salvin and Frederick DuCane Godman 1879–1904. Biologia Centrali-Americana. Aves
- Members of the German Ornithologists' Society in Journal für Ornithologie online BHL
- The Ibis
- Novitates Zoologicae
- Ornithologische Monatsberichte Verlag von R. Friedländer & Sohn, Berlin. Years of publication: 1893–1938 online Zobodat
- Ornis; internationale Zeitschrift für die gesammte Ornithologie.Vienna 1885-1905 online BHL
- Anton Reichenow Die Vögel Afrikas Neudamm, J. Neumann,1900-05 online BHL
- The Auk online BHL
