= 1898 in birding and ornithology =

- Years in birding and ornithology: 1895 1896 1897 1898 1899 1900 1901
- Centuries: 18th century · 19th century · 20th century
- Decades: 1860s 1870s 1880s 1890s 1900s 1910s 1920s
- Years: 1895 1896 1897 1898 1899 1900 1901

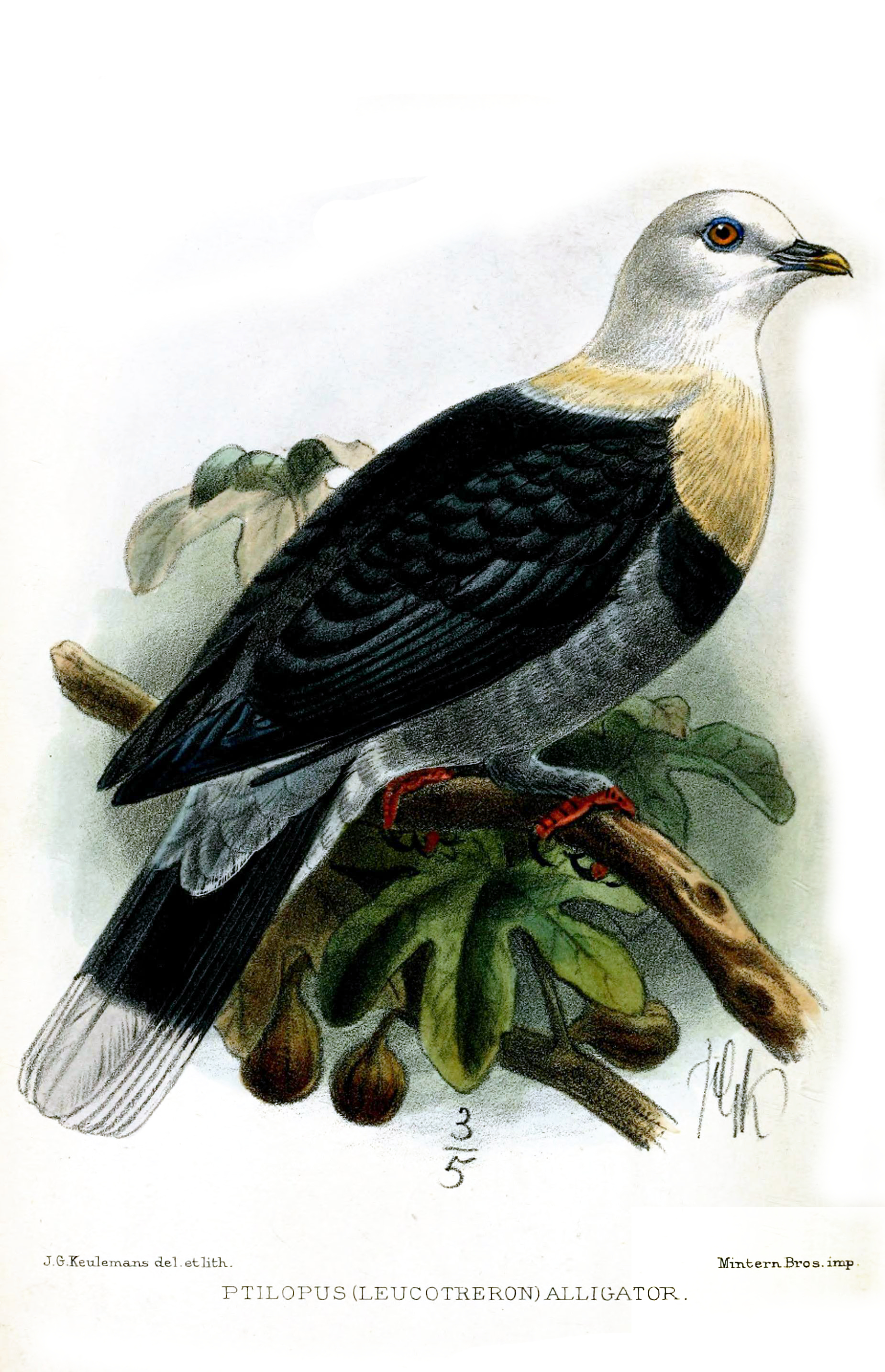
Black-banded fruit dove Proceedings of the Zoological Society of London 1898

- Birds described in 1898 include Foveaux shag, Bismarck kingfisher, carunculated fruit dove, grey-streaked honeyeater, Sula jungle flycatcher, Lord Howe golden whistler, Raso lark, Santa Marta foliage-gleaner, Sharpe's starling,

== Events ==
- Death of Osbert Salvin, Oskar von Riesenthal, Frederick George Waterhouse, Alfred Hart Everett,
- Otto Finsch became curator of the bird collections at the Rijksmuseum van Natuurlijke Historie in Leiden.

== Publications ==
- Charles Dixon Lost and Vanishing Birds (1898) online
- Hans Friedrich Gadow Classification of the Vertebrata, recent and extinct Black, London (1898) online BHL
- Adolf Bernhard Meyer The Birds of Celebes (1898).online
- Oskar Neumann, 1898 Beiträge zur Vogelfauna von Ost- und Central-Afrika. Die von mir auf meiner Expedition durch die Massai-Länder und in den Ländern am Victoria Nyansa 1892-1895 gesammelten und beobachteten Vögel. Journal für Ornithologie. Bd. 46, Nr. 2, S. 227–305.

Ongoing events

- Osbert Salvin and Frederick DuCane Godman 1879–1904. Biologia Centrali-Americana . Aves
- Richard Bowdler Sharpe Catalogue of the Birds in the British Museum London,1874-98.
- Eugene W. Oates and William Thomas Blanford 1889–1898. The Fauna of British India, Including Ceylon and Burma. Vols. I-IV. Birds.
- Oskar Neumann and Members of the German Ornithologists' Society in Journal für Ornithologie online BHL
- The Ibis
- Novitates Zoologicae
- Ornithologische Monatsberichte Verlag von R. Friedländer & Sohn, Berlin.1893–1938 online Zobodat
- Ornis; internationale Zeitschrift für die gesammte Ornithologie.Vienna 1885-1905online BHL
- The Auk online BHL
