= 1895 in birding and ornithology =

- Years in birding and ornithology: 1892 1893 1894 1895 1896 1897 1898
- Centuries: 18th century · 19th century · 20th century
- Decades: 1860s 1870s 1880s 1890s 1900s 1910s 1920s
- Years: 1892 1893 1894 1895 1896 1897 1898

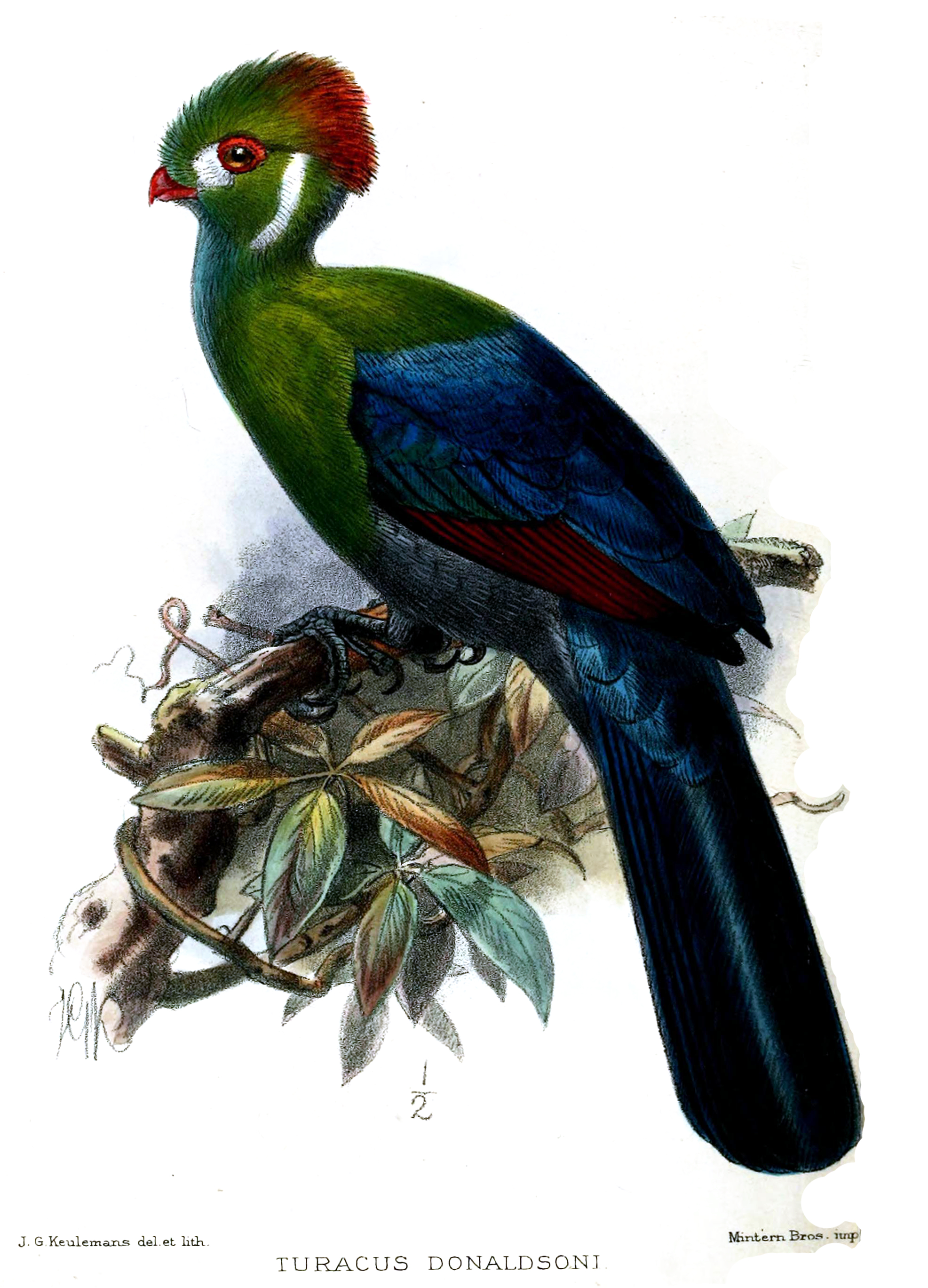
White-cheeked turaco Proceedings of the Zoological Society of London 1895

- Birds described in 1895 include alder flycatcher, banded whiteface, black-capped catbird, Cocos flycatcher, frill-necked monarch, dark-eared myza, Gillett's lark, Grey-headed honeyeater, trilling tailorbird

== Events ==
- Manchester Museum acquires the bird skin collection of Henry Eeles Dresser it includes Palaearctic bird species, bee-eaters and rollers that formed the basis of Dresser's books'
- Death of Henry Seebohm, Janos Frivaldszky,

== Publications ==
- Oskar Engelhard von Löwis of Menar Unsere Baltischen Singvögel Reval, Franz Kluge, 1895
- Frederick Webb Headley The Structure and Life of Birds, London and New York, Macmillan and Co. (1895)
- D'Arcy Wentworth Thompson, 1895. A glossary of Greek birds. Oxford U. P.
- Alexandre Noël Charles Acloque 1895–1900. Faune de France, contenant la description des espèces indigènes. Paris online (pars)
- Ernst Hartert On some Birds from the Congo Region.Novitates Zoologicae ii. p. 55.

Ongoing events

- Osbert Salvin and Frederick DuCane Godman 1879–1904. Biologia Centrali-Americana . Aves
- Richard Bowdler Sharpe Catalogue of the Birds in the British Museum London,1874-98.
- Eugene W. Oates and William Thomas Blanford 1889–1898. The Fauna of British India, Including Ceylon and Burma. Vols. I-IV. Birds.
- Anton Reichenow, Jean Cabanis, and other members of the German Ornithologists' Society in Journal für Ornithologie online BHL
- The Ibis
- Ornithologische Monatsberichte Verlag von R. Friedländer & Sohn, Berlin.1893–1938 online Zobodat
- Ornis; internationale Zeitschrift für die gesammte Ornithologie.Vienna 1885-1905 online BHL
- The Auk online BHL
