= 1903 in birding and ornithology =

- Years in birding and ornithology: 1900 1901 1902 1903 1904 1905 1906
- Centuries: 19th century · 20th century · 21st century
- Decades: 1870s 1880s 1890s 1900s 1910s 1920s 1930s
- Years: 1900 1901 1902 1903 1904 1905 1906

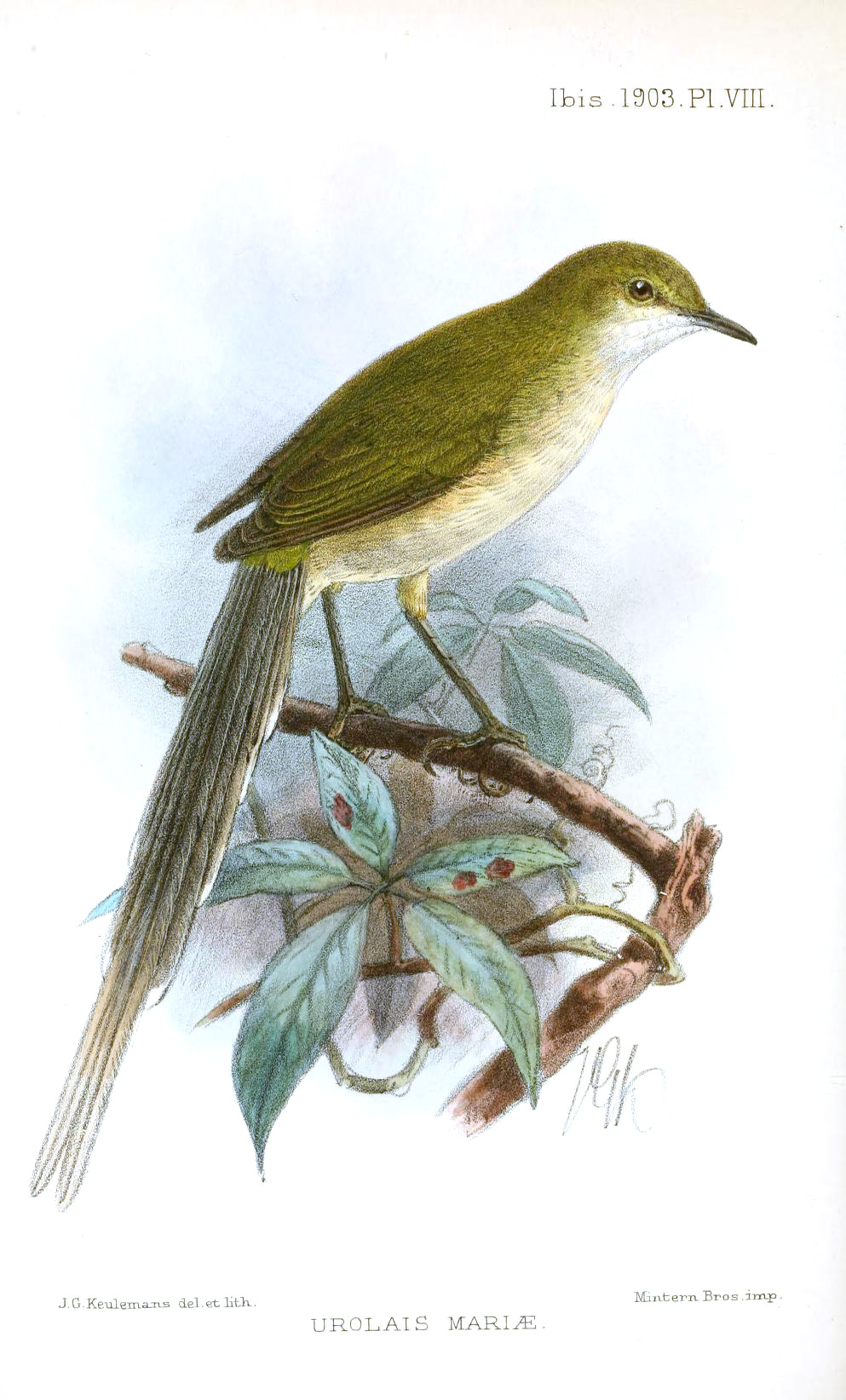
Green longtail Ibis 1903

- Birds described in 1903 include black-and-cinnamon fantail, Fernando Po batis, grey-eyed bulbul, grey-headed broadbill, Indian yellow-nosed albatross, Mindanao white-eye, mountain peacock-pheasant, pale batis, Sharpe's akalat, Shelley's oliveback, Somali lark, Ursula's sunbird, western fieldwren

== Events ==
- Death of Thomas McIlwraith, Alexander von Homeyer, Neville Henry Cayley
- Robert Hall explores Siberia, Korea and Japan

== Publications ==
- Ernst Hartert Die Vögel der paläarktischen Fauna. Systematische Uebersicht der in Europa, Nord-Asien und der Mittelmeerregionen vorkommenden Vogel. Von Ernst Hartert. Heft I. Berlin: Friedlander. 8vo. Pp. 112, November 1903.
- Reginald Badham Lodge Pictures of Bird-life in Woodland, Meadow, Mountain, and Marsh. By R. B. Lodge. 4to. London : Boustield & Co., 1903.
- Oscar Neumann 1903: Neue afrikanische Species und Subspecies. In: Ornithologische Monatsberichte. Bd. 11, Nr. 12, S. 180–187.
- Arthur Humble Evans, 1903. Turner on birds: a short and succinct history of the principal birds noticed by Pliny and Aristotle, first published by Doctor William Turner, 1544. Cambridge U.P.
- Eugene W. Oates On the Silver-Pheasants of Burma Ibis 1903:93-106
- Tommaso Salvadori, 1903 Contribuzioni alla ornitologia delle Isole del Golfo di Guinea. Memorie della Reale Academia delle Scienze di Torino, serie II, tomo LIII (1903) I – Uccelli dell'Isola del Principe, II – Uccelli dell'Isola di San Thomé III – Uccelli di Anno-Bom e di Fernando Po

Ongoing events

- Osbert Salvin and Frederick DuCane Godman 1879–1904. Biologia Centrali-Americana . Aves
- Members of the German Ornithologists' Society in Journal für Ornithologie online BHL
- The Ibis
- Novitates Zoologicae
- Ornithologische Monatsberichte Verlag von R. Friedländer & Sohn, Berlin. Years of publication: 1893–1938 online Zobodat
- Ornis; internationale Zeitschrift für die gesammte Ornithologie.Vienna 1885-1905 online BHL
- Anton Reichenow Die Vögel Afrikas Neudamm, J. Neumann,1900-05 online BHL
- Robert Ridgway, 1902-1919 [1941, 1946] The birds of North and Middle America : a descriptive catalogue of the higher groups, genera, species, and subspecies of birds known to occur in North America, from the Arctic lands to the Isthmus of Panama, the West Indies and other islands of the Caribbean sea, and the Galapagos Archipelago Washington Govt. Print. Off. online BHL
- The Auk online BHL
