= 1901 in birding and ornithology =

- Years in birding and ornithology: 1898 1899 1900 1901 1902 1903 1904
- Centuries: 19th century · 20th century · 21st century
- Decades: 1870s 1880s 1890s 1900s 1910s 1920s 1930s
- Years: 1898 1899 1900 1901 1902 1903 1904

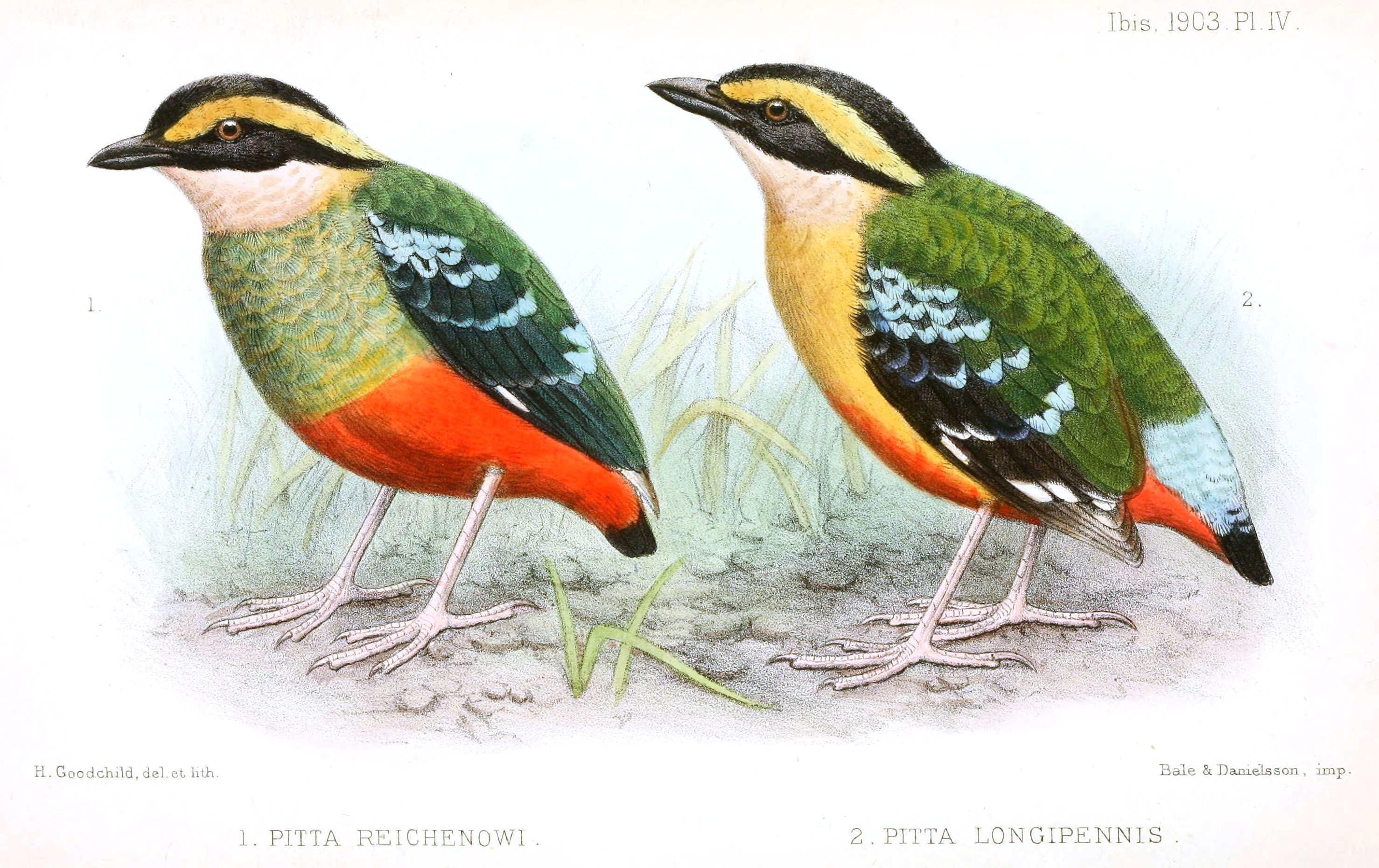
The green-breasted pitta (left) was described in 1901

Events relating to birding and ornithology that occurred in 1901 include:

The description of the blue-wattled bulbul, Cape Verde swift, Solomons frogmouth, Colima pygmy-owl, fearful owl, green-breasted pitta and waterfall swift, Rothschild's lobe-billed bird-of-paradise.

== Events ==
- Rossitten Bird Observatory in East Prussia, founded by Johannes Thienemann, opened on 1 January under the auspices of the Deutsche Ornithologen-Gesellschaft
- Royal Australasian Ornithologists Union founded in Melbourne, Australia
- Death of Waldemar Hartwig

== Publications ==
- Henry Seebohm’s The Birds of Siberia published
- Journal Cassinia first published
- Journal Emu first published
- Howard Saunders The Antarctic Manual for the use of the Expedition of 1901. Edited by George Murray, F.L.S. Birds : [birds] by Howard Saunders, F.L.S., F.Z.S., R.E.G.S. pp. 225–238. Royal Geographical Society, 1 Savile Row, London, 1901.]
- Frank Finn List of the Birds in the Indian Museum. Part I. Families Corvidae, Paradiseidae, Ptilonorhynchidae and Crateropodidae, By F. Finn B.A. F.Z.S., Deputy Superintendent of the Indian Museum. 8vo. Calcutta, 1901. Pp. i-xv, 1-115. Price 1 rupee.
- Jonathan Dwight The sequence of plumages and moults of the passerine birds of New York, Annals of the New York Academy of Sciences 13, 1900, S. 73–360
- Boyd Alexander On the Birds of the Gold Coast Colony and its Hinterland Ibis Volume 44, Issue3 1902 :355 -377

Ongoing events

- Osbert Salvin and Frederick DuCane Godman 1879–1904. Biologia Centrali-Americana . Aves
- Members of the German Ornithologists' Society in Journal für Ornithologie online BHL
- The Ibis
- Novitates Zoologicae
- Ornithologische Monatsberichte Verlag von R. Friedländer & Sohn, Berlin. Years of publication: 1893–1938 online Zobodat
- Ornis; internationale Zeitschrift für die gesammte Ornithologie.Vienna 1885-1905 online BHL
- Anton Reichenow Die Vögel Afrikas Neudamm, J. Neumann,1900-05 online BHL
- The Auk online BHL
