= 1894 in birding and ornithology =

- Years in birding and ornithology: 1891 1892 1893 1894 1895 1896 1897
- Centuries: 18th century · 19th century · 20th century
- Decades: 1860s 1870s 1880s 1890s 1900s 1910s 1920s
- Years: 1891 1892 1893 1894 1895 1896 1897

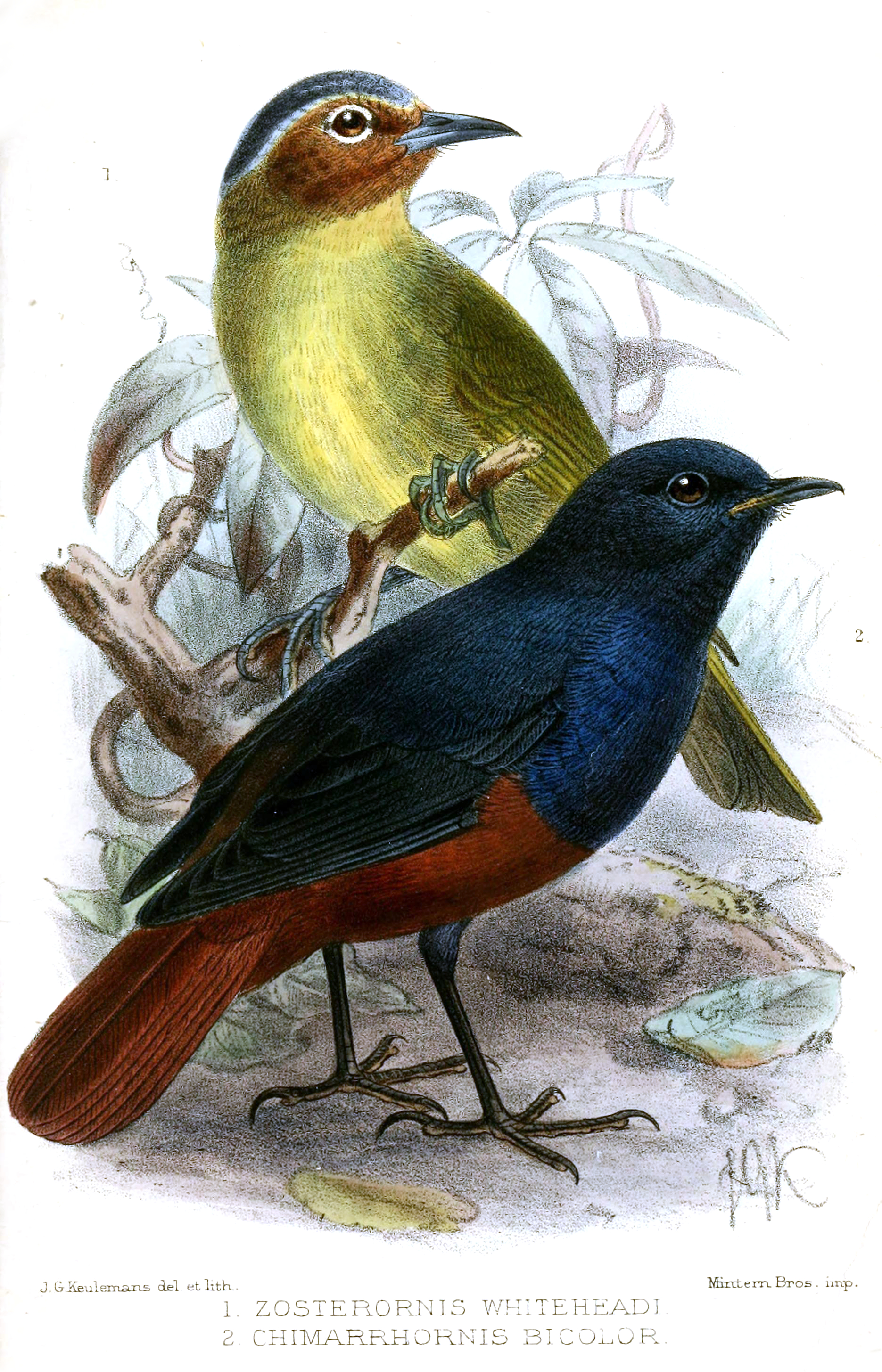
chestnut-faced Babbler and Luzon Water Redstart Ibis 1894

- Birds described in 1894 include Junin grebe, Ecuadorian rail, Kenrick's starling, helmeted myna, leaf lorikeet, Loria's satinbird, red-throated wood rail, mountain honeyeater, streaked berrypecker, Luzon sunbird

== Events ==
- Death of Karl Theodor Liebe, Ferdinand Heine
- The journal Aquila established by Ottó Herman.
- Charles Wallace Richmond becomes Associate Curator of Birds at the Smithsonian Institution.
- Horn expedition
- William Frederick Henry Rosenberg expedition to Colombia.

== Publications ==
- Joseph Whitaker Notes on some Tunisian birds.Ibis 78–100, map. 1
- Hans von Berlepsch and Jean Stanislaus Stolzmann Descriptions de quelques Espèces nouvelles d'Oiseaux du Perou central. The Ibis 1894. Vol. 6 6th. series no. 23: 385–406.
- Adolf Bernhard Meyer and Lionel William Wiglesworth Ueber eine erste Sammlung von Vögeln von den Talaut Inseln Journal für Ornithologie volume 42:237–253 (1894)
- Anton Reichenow Die Vögel Deutsch-Ostafrikas Berlin:Geographische Verlagshandlung Dietrich Reimer,1894.online BHL

Ongoing events

- Osbert Salvin and Frederick DuCane Godman 1879–1904. Biologia Centrali-Americana . Aves
- Richard Bowdler Sharpe Catalogue of the Birds in the British Museum London,1874-98.
- Eugene W. Oates and William Thomas Blanford 1889–1898. The Fauna of British India, Including Ceylon and Burma. Vols. I-IV. Birds.
- Anton Reichenow, Jean Cabanis, and other members of the German Ornithologists' Society in Journal für Ornithologie online BHL
- The Ibis
- Ornithologische Monatsberichte Verlag von R. Friedländer & Sohn, Berlin.1893–1938 online Zobodat
- Ornis; internationale Zeitschrift für die gesammte Ornithologie.Vienna 1885-1905 online BHL
- The Auk online BHL
