= 1893 in birding and ornithology =

- Years in birding and ornithology: 1890 1891 1892 1893 1894 1895 1896
- Centuries: 18th century · 19th century · 20th century
- Decades: 1860s 1870s 1880s 1890s 1900s 1910s 1920s
- Years: 1890 1891 1892 1893 1894 1895 1896

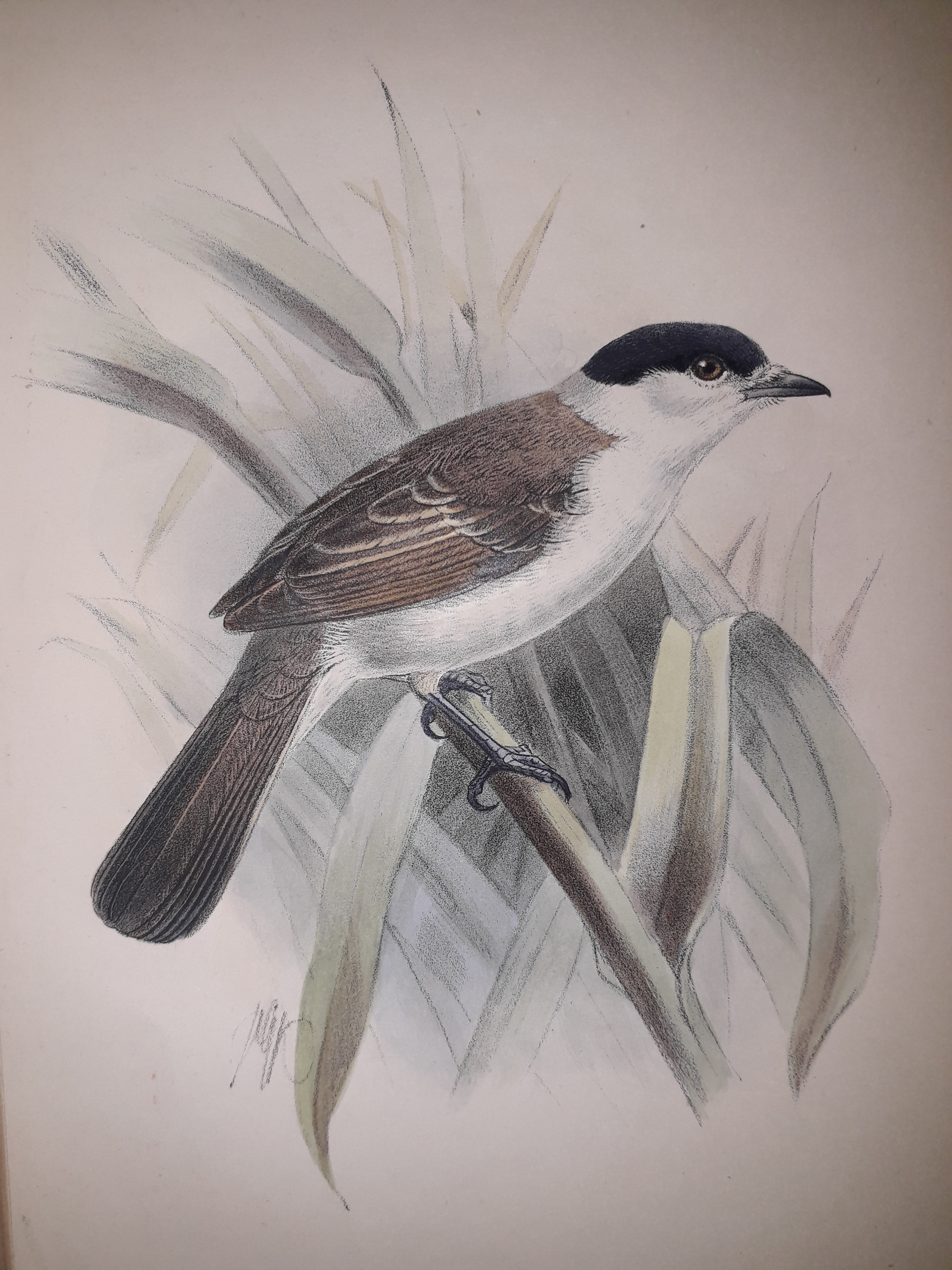
White-naped xenopsaris in the Proceedings of the Zoological Society of London (1893)

Birds described in 1893 include Attwater's prairie chicken, the Auckland rail, blue-winged racket-tail, black-winged petrel, Laysan albatross, Chatham petrel, Mauritius night heron, Mauritius scops owl, purple-breasted sunbird, violet-throated metaltail, white-bellied tyrannulet, Whyte's barbet and the white-bellied crested flycatcher.

== Events ==
- Deaths of Francis Orpen Morris, Léon Olphe-Galliard, William Ruxton Davison and August Carl Eduard Baldamus.
- Ornithologische Monatsberichte Berlin: Verlag von R. Friedländer & Sohn commences.
- Johann Büttikofer joins the Nieuwenhuis Expedition to central Borneo.
- Witmer Stone becomes Assistant Curator at The Academy of Natural Sciences of Philadelphia.

== Publications ==
- Henry Edwin Barnes (1893). "On the Birds of Aden". The Ibis.
- Joel Asaph Allen (1893). "On a collection of birds from Chapada, Matto Grosso, Brazil, made by Mr. Herbert H. Smith. Part 1, Oscines". Bulletin of the American Museum of Natural History. 3 (24).
- Alfred Newton (assisted by Hans Gadow, with contributions from Richard Lydekker, Charles S. Roy and Robert Shufeldt) (1893–1896). A Dictionary of Birds. Black.
- Émile Oustalet (1893). La Protection des oiseaux [The Protection of Birds]. Reprinted in 1895 & re-edited in 1900.

== Ongoing events ==
- Osbert Salvin and Frederick DuCane Godman (1879–1904). Biologia Centrali-Americana Aves.
- Richard Bowdler Sharpe (1874-1898). Catalogue of the Birds in the British Museum London.
- Eugene W. Oates and William Thomas Blanford (1889–1898). The Fauna of British India, Including Ceylon and Burma: Birds Volumes I–IV.
- Anton Reichenow, Jean Cabanis, and other members of the German Ornithologists' Society in Journal für Ornithologie
- Ornis; internationale Zeitschrift für die gesammte Ornithologie.Vienna 1885-1905online BHL
- The Ibis
- The Auk online BHL
