= 1890 in birding and ornithology =

- Years in birding and ornithology: 1887 1888 1889 1890 1891 1892 1893
- Centuries: 18th century · 19th century · 20th century
- Decades: 1860s 1870s 1880s 1890s 1900s 1910s 1920s
- Years: 1887 1888 1889 1890 1891 1892 1893

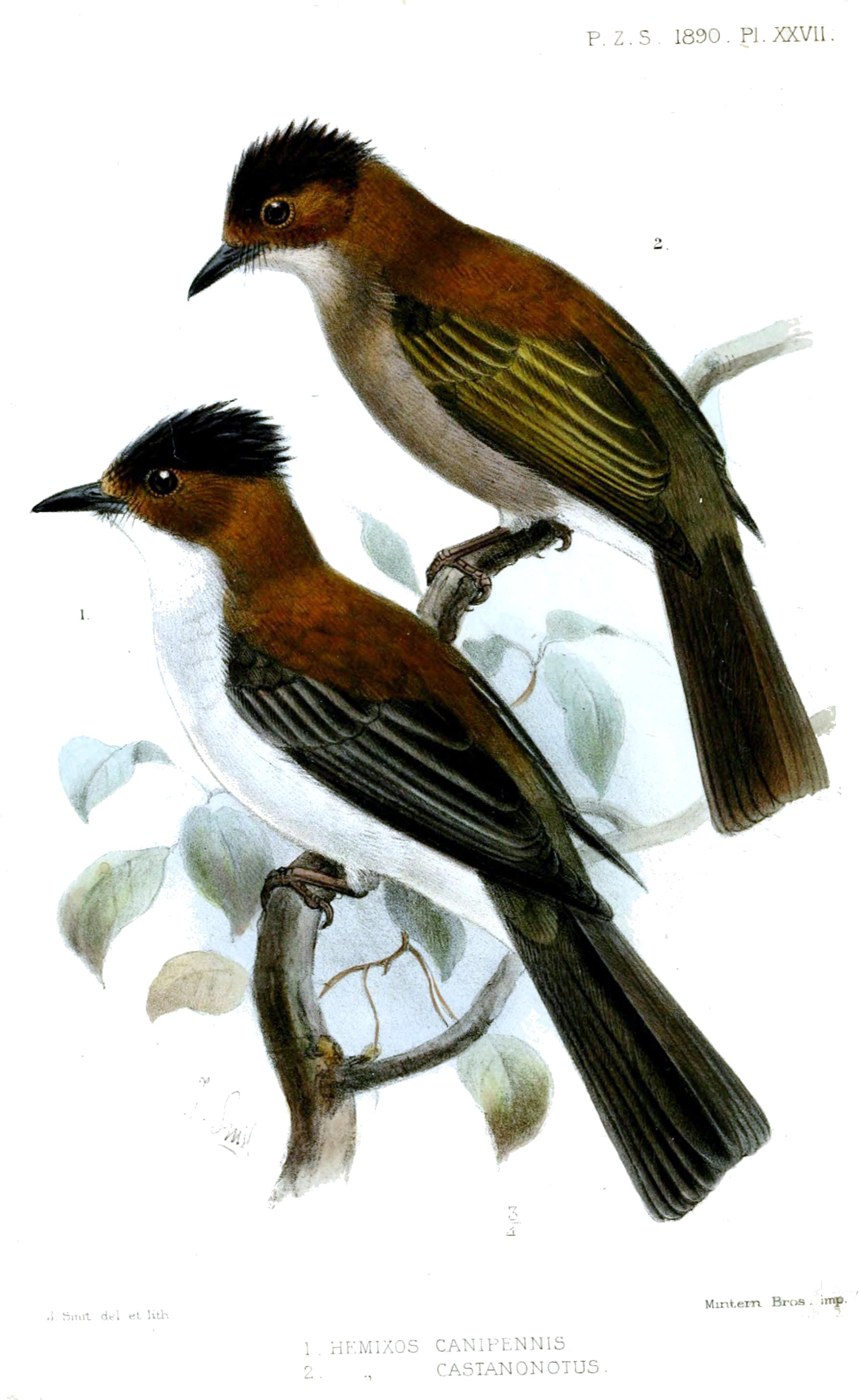
Chestnut bulbul in Proceedings of the Zoological Society of London (1890) Joseph Smit

Birds described in 1890 include the bamboo warbler, blue-capped ifrit, red satinbird, Española cactus finch, grey-striped spurfowl, hooded cuckooshrike, Laysan finch, maroon-naped sunbird, Patagonian tinamou and Townsend's shearwater.

== Events ==
- Deaths of John Henry Gurney and Antonie Augustus Bruijn

== Publications ==
- Johann Büttikofer (1890). Reisebilder aus Liberia, resultate geographischer, naturwissenschaftlicher und ethnographischer Untersuchungen während der Jahre 1879-1882 und 1886-1887. Leiden.
- Gustav Hartlaub (1890-1891). "Ein Beitrag zur Ornithologie Chinas". Abhandlungen des Naturwissenschaftlichen Vereins zu Bremen. 12: 295–335.
- Joseph Beal Steere (1890). "A List of Birds and Mammals Collected by the Steere Expedition to the Philippines, with New Species".
- Charles Walter De Vis (1889 [1890]). "Report on birds from British New Guinea". Annual Report on British New Guinea by Her Majesty's Administrator of the Government from 4 September 1888 to 30 June 1889, With Map and Appendices. Brisbane: Edmund Gregory, Government Printer: 58–61.
- Charles Haskins Townsend (1890). "Scientific results of explorations by the U. S. Fish Commission steamer Albatross. No. XIV. Birds from the coasts of western North America and adjacent islands, collected in 1888-'89, with descriptions of new species". Proceedings of the United States National Museum. 13 (799): 131–142.
- Scott Barchard Wilson and Arthur Humble Evans (1890-1899). Aves Hawaiienses: The Birds of the Sandwich Islands. R. H. Porter.
- Anton Reichenow Die Vogelwelt von Kamerun (1890–1896) online Zobodat

== Ongoing events ==
- Osbert Salvin and Frederick DuCane Godman (1879-1904). Biologia Centrali-Americana. Aves.
- Richard Bowdler Sharpe (1874-1898). Catalogue of the Birds in the British Museum London.
- Eugene W. Oates and William Thomas Blanford (1889-1898). The Fauna of British India, Including Ceylon and Burma: Birds Volumes I-IV.
- Anton Reichenow, Jean Cabanis, and other members of the German Ornithologists' Society in Journal für Ornithologie
- The Ibis
- Ornis; internationale Zeitschrift für die gesammte Ornithologie.Vienna 1885-1905online BHL
- The Auk online BHL
