= 1892 in birding and ornithology =

- Years in birding and ornithology: 1889 1890 1891 1892 1893 1894 1895
- Centuries: 18th century · 19th century · 20th century
- Decades: 1860s 1870s 1880s 1890s 1900s 1910s 1920s
- Years: 1889 1890 1891 1892 1893 1894 1895

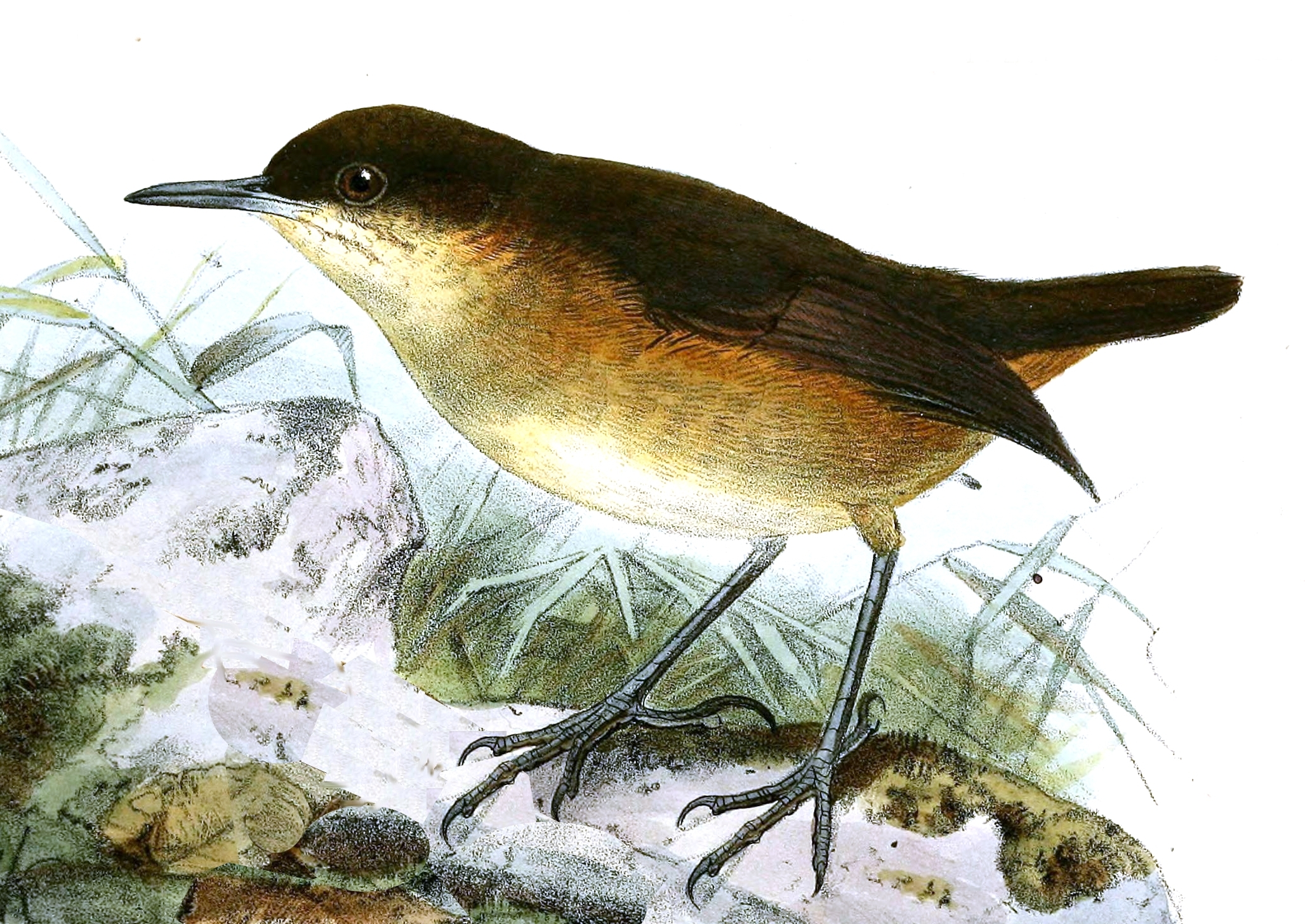
São Tomé shorttail in the Proceedings of the Zoological Society of London 1892

Birds described in 1892 include the Laysan honeycreeper, Abyssinian crimsonwing, Chatham raven, black oriole, Tullberg's woodpecker, spotted nightjar, Hose's broadbill, Bolivian earthcreeper, Chubb's cisticola, greater ground robin, streak-throated hermit, green-breasted bushshrike and the Gough moorhen.

== Events ==
- Foundation of the British Ornithologists' Club
- Death of Henry Walter Bates
- Ernst Hartert becomes curator of birds at the Tring Museum
- First issue of Bulletin of the British Ornithologists' Club online

== Publications ==
- Henry Ogg Forbes (1892). "Preliminary notice of additions to the extinct Avifauna of New Zealand. (Abstract.)". Transactions and Proceedings of the New Zealand Institute. 24: 185–189.
- Adolphe Boucard (1892–1895). Genera of Humming Birds: Being Also a Complete Monograph of These Birds. London.
- Charles Dixon (1892). The Migration of Birds: An Attempt to Reduce Avian Season-Flight to Law. London: Chapman and Hall.
- Charles B. Cory (1892). Catalogue of West Indian Birds, Containing a List of All Species Known to Occur in the Bahama Islands, the Greater Antilles, the Caymans, and the Lesser Antilles, Excepting the Islands of Tobago and Trinidad. Boston. The author.

== Ongoing events ==
- Osbert Salvin and Frederick DuCane Godman (1879–1904). Biologia Centrali-Americana. Aves.
- Richard Bowdler Sharpe (1874–1898). Catalogue of the Birds in the British Museum London.
- Eugene W. Oates and William Thomas Blanford (1889–1898). The Fauna of British India, Including Ceylon and Burma: Birds Volumes I–IV.
- Anton Reichenow, Bror Yngve Sjöstedt, and other members of the German Ornithologists' Society in Journal für Ornithologie.
- The Ibis
- Ornis; internationale Zeitschrift für die gesammte Ornithologie.Vienna 1885-1905 online BHL
- The Auk online BHL
