= 1888 in birding and ornithology =

- Years in birding and ornithology: 1885 1886 1887 1888 1889 1890 1891
- Centuries: 18th century · 19th century · 20th century
- Decades: 1850s 1860s 1870s 1880s 1890s 1900s 1910s
- Years: 1885 1886 1887 1888 1889 1890 1891

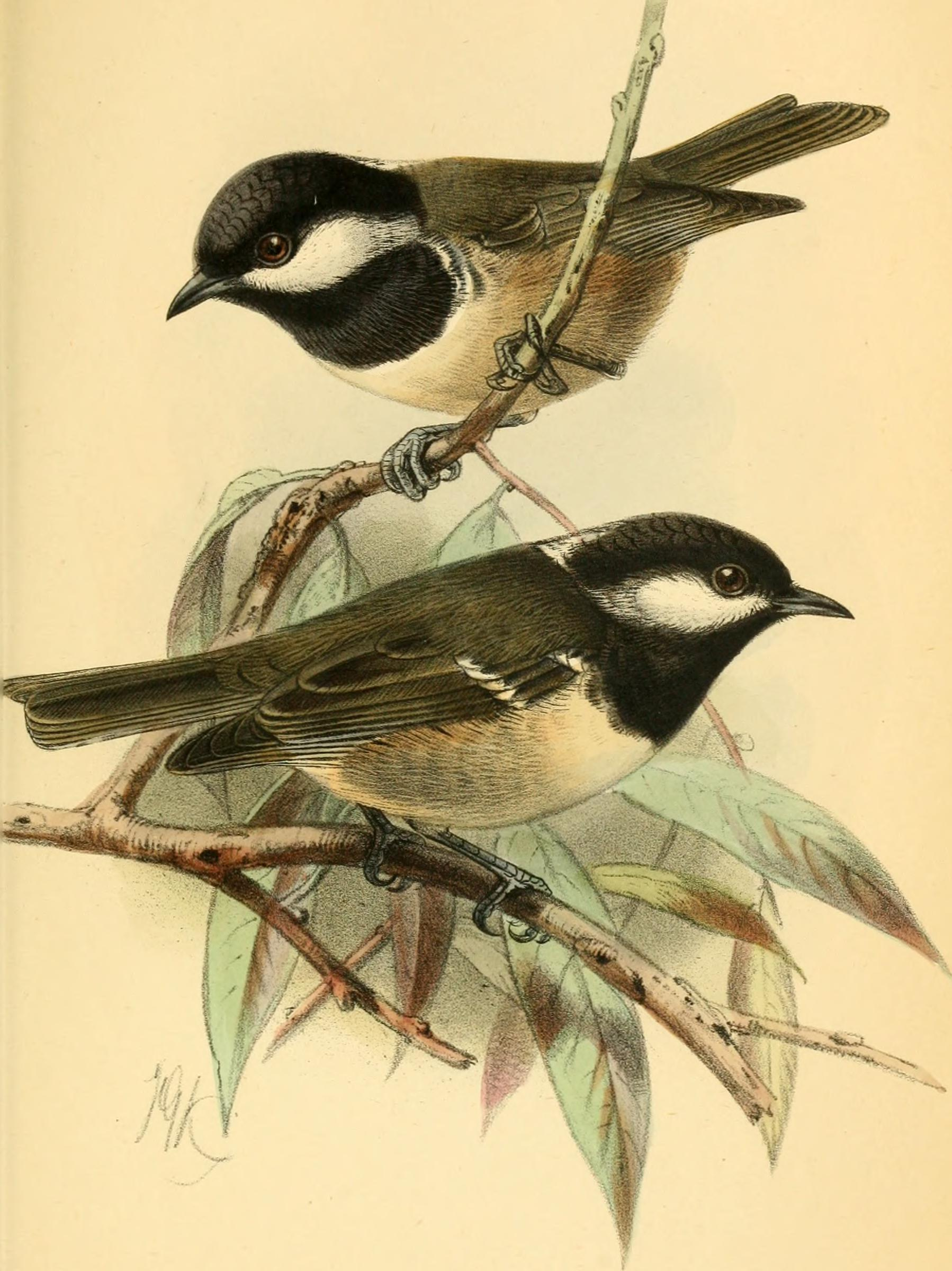
Illustration of Parus cypriotes by John Gerrard Keulemans in The Ibis 1888

- Birds described in 1888 include bare-headed laughingthrush, Bolivian warbling finch, Borneo thrush, Damara red-billed hornbill, emperor bird-of-paradise, friendly bush warbler, Golden-backed weaver, Herald petrel, Jankowski's bunting, Palawan flycatcher, Somali bunting, Whitehead's broadbill,

== Events ==
- Joseph Jackson Lister serves as volunteer naturalist on the surveying voyage of HMS Egeria to the Indian Ocean.
- Death of Hermann von Rosenberg

== Publications ==
- George Ernest Shelley On the Hornbills of the Ethiopian Region Ibis 1888: 47-70 online
- Richard Bowdler Sharpe Further Descriptions of new Species of Birds dkcovered by Mr. John Whitehead on the Mounts of Kina Balu, Northern Borneo Ibis 1888 :383-396
- Edward Bartlett "Monograph of the Weaver Birds (Ploceidae) and Arboreal and Terrestrial Finches " five parts published in 1888–89

Ongoing events

- Osbert Salvin and Frederick DuCane Godman 1879–1904. Biologia Centrali-Americana . Aves
- Richard Bowdler Sharpe Catalogue of the Birds in the British Museum London,1874-98.
- Anton Reichenow, Jean Cabanis, and other members of the German Ornithologists' Society in Journal für Ornithologie online BHL
- Ornis; internationale Zeitschrift für die gesammte Ornithologie.Vienna 1885-1905online BHL
- The Auk online BHL
- The Ibis
