= 1889 in birding and ornithology =

- Years in birding and ornithology: 1886 1887 1888 1889 1890 1891 1892
- Centuries: 18th century · 19th century · 20th century
- Decades: 1850s 1860s 1870s 1880s 1890s 1900s 1910s
- Years: 1886 1887 1888 1889 1890 1891 1892

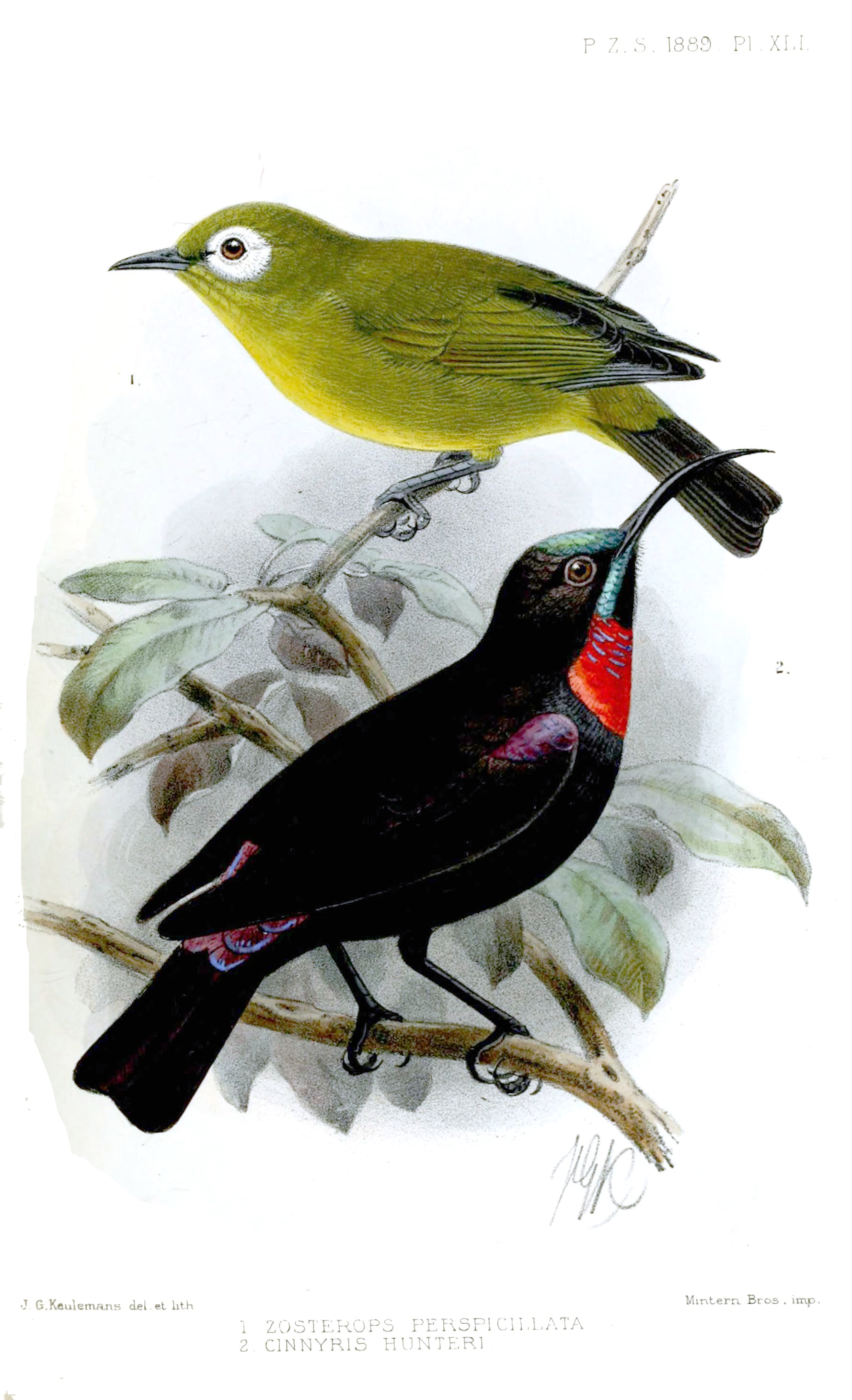
Montane White-eye and Hunter's sunbird Proceedings of the Zoological Society 1889

- Birds described in 1889 include blue-moustached bee-eater, Colima warbler, crowned hornbill, Esmeraldas woodstar, giant sunbird, fernwren, grey-crowned woodpecker, Hunter's sunbird, mountain greenbul, Reischek's parakeet, Woodford's rail.

== Events ==
- Death of Juan Lembeye and Eugen Ferdinand von Homeyer
- Lamberto Loria begins collecting in New Guinea
- Foundation of Royal Society for the Protection of Birds

== Publications ==
- Hans von Berlepsch Zur Ornithologie der Provinz Santa Catharina, Süd-Brasilien; Journ. f. Ornith. 21, 1873, p. 225–293; l. c. Zur Ornithologie der Provinz Santa Catharina, Süd-Brasilien; Journ. f. Ornith. 22, 1874, p. 241–284.
- Eugene W. Oates and William Thomas Blanford 1889–1898. The Fauna of British India, Including Ceylon and Burma. Vols. I-IV. Birds.
- Joel Asaph Allen 1889. List of the birds collected in Bolivia by Dr. H. H. Rusby, with field notes by the collector. Bulletin of the American Museum of Natural History 2: 77-112 online AMNH
- Alfred John North and George Barnard Descriptive Catalogue of the Nests and Eggs of Birds Found Breeding in Australia and Tasmania (1889)

Ongoing events

- Osbert Salvin and Frederick DuCane Godman 1879–1904. Biologia Centrali-Americana . Aves
- Richard Bowdler Sharpe Catalogue of the Birds in the British Museum London,1874-98.
- Anton Reichenow, Jean Cabanis, and other members of the German Ornithologists' Society in Journal für Ornithologie online BHL
- Ornis; internationale Zeitschrift für die gesammte Ornithologie.Vienna 1885-1905online BHL
- The Auk online BHL
- The Ibis
