= Daniel Klem =

American ornithologist

Daniel Klem Jr.
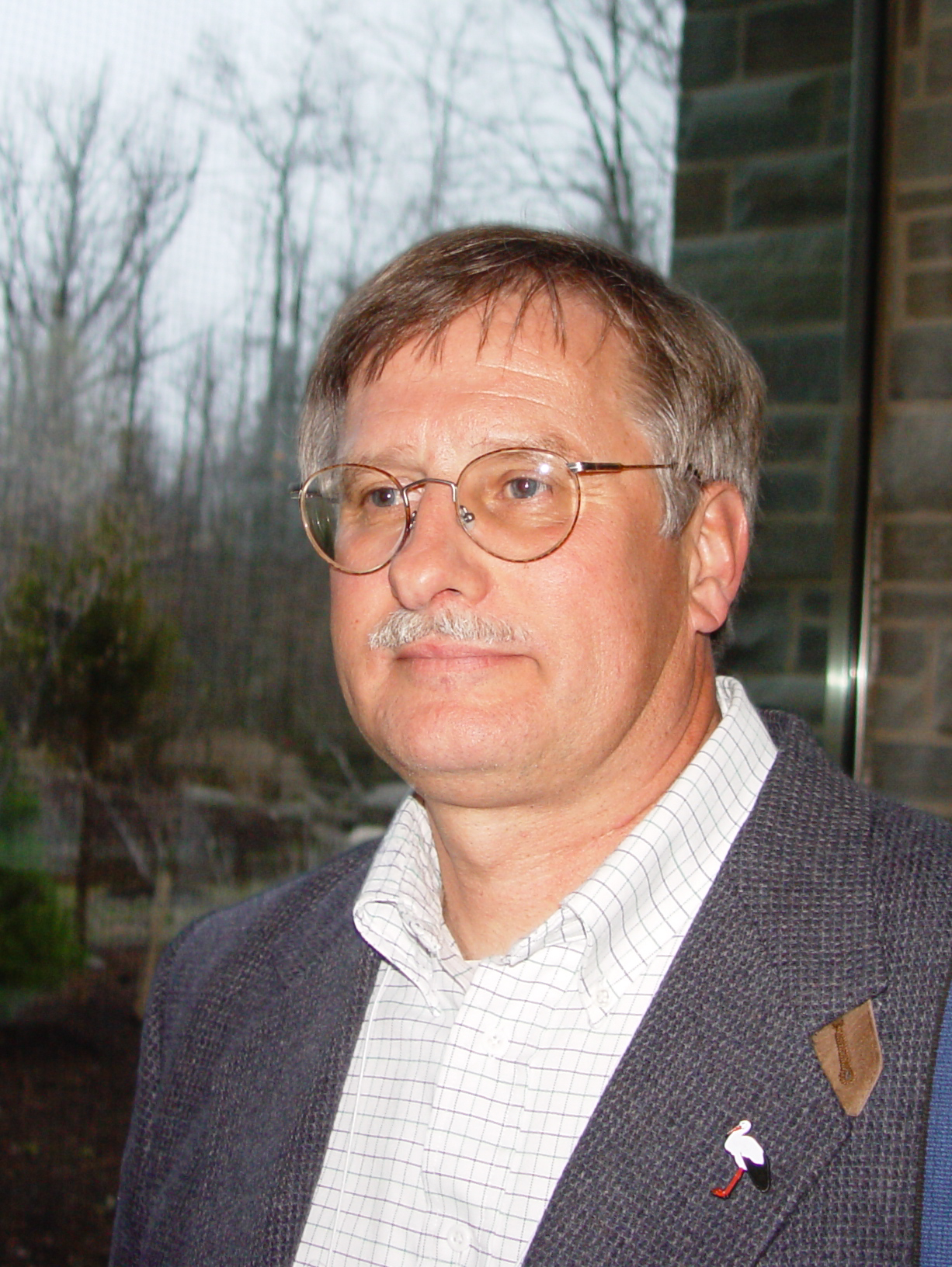
- Klem in 2004
- Scientific career
- Fields: Ornithology
- Institutions: Muhlenberg College
- Website: www.muhlenberg.edu/main/academics/biology/facultystaff/danielklemjr/

Daniel Klem Jr. is an American ornithologist, known for his pioneering research into the mortality of birds due to glass windows. He is the Sarkis Acopian Professor of Ornithology and Conservation Biology at Muhlenberg College. He has been teaching there since 1979.

Klem obtained his BSc at Wilkes University and his MSc at Hofstra University. He served in the US military during the Vietnam War, and was awarded the Bronze Star Medal. He subsequently obtained his doctorate from Southern Illinois University.

In his 1990 papers "Bird injuries, cause of death, and recuperation from collisions with windows" and "Collisions between birds and windows: mortality and prevention", he calculated that between 100 million and 1 billion birds are killed, annually, in the United States alone, by flying into windows.

His research has influenced the design of buildings, not least the Niagara Falls State Park Observation Tower, on which he was a design consultant. He holds several US patents relating to windows design. He has also written about the birds of Armenia.

He received an honorary doctorate from Wilkes University, where he is also a trustee.

== Bibliography ==
- Adamian, Martin S.; Klem, Daniel (1997). A Field Guide to Birds of Armenia. American University of Armenia Corporation. ISBN 978-0965742924.
- Adamian, Martin S.; Klem, Daniel (1999). Handbook of the Birds of Armenia. American University of Armenia Corporation. ISBN 978-0965742931.

=== Papers ===
- Klem, D., Jr. (2009). Avian mortality at windows: The second largest human source of bird mortality on earth. In Tundra to Tropics: Proceedings of the Fourth International Partners in Flight Conference (T. D. Rich, C. Arizmendi, D. Demarest, and C. Thompson, Editors). Partners in Flight, pp. 244–251.
- Klem, Daniel; Farmer, Christopher J.; Delacretaz, Nicole; Gelb, Yigal; Saenger, Peter G. (2009). "Architectural and Landscape Risk Factors Associated with Bird–glass Collisions in an Urban Environment". The Wilson Journal of Ornithology. 121 (1): 126–134. doi:10.1676/08-068.1. ISSN 1559-4491. S2CID 59061397.
- Klem, D., Jr. (2006). Glass: A deadly conservation issue for birds. Bird Observer 34:73–81.
- Klem, Daniel; Keck, David C.; Marty, Karl L.; Miller Ball, Amy J.; Niciu, Elizabeth E.; Platt, Corry T. (2004). "Effects of window angling, feeder placement, and scavengers on avian mortality at plate glass". The Wilson Bulletin. 116 (1). The Wilson Ornithological Society: 69–73. doi:10.1676/0043-5643(2004)116[0069:EOWAFP]2.0.CO;2. ISSN 0043-5643. S2CID 86352747.
- Klem, Daniel (1990). "Bird injuries, cause of death, and recuperation from collisions with windows" (PDF). Journal of Field Ornithology. 61: 115–119.
- Klem, Daniel (1990). "Collisions between birds and windows: Mortality and prevention" (PDF). Journal of Field Ornithology. 61: 120–128.
- Klem, D., Jr. (1989). Bird–window collisions. The Wilson Bulletin 101:606–620.
- Klem, D., Jr. (1979). Biology of collisions between birds and windows. Ph.D. dissertation, Southern Illinois University, Carbondale, IL, USA.
