= 1887 in birding and ornithology =

- Years in birding and ornithology: 1884 1885 1886 1887 1888 1889 1890
- Centuries: 18th century · 19th century · 20th century
- Decades: 1850s 1860s 1870s 1880s 1890s 1900s 1910s
- Years: 1884 1885 1886 1887 1888 1889 1890

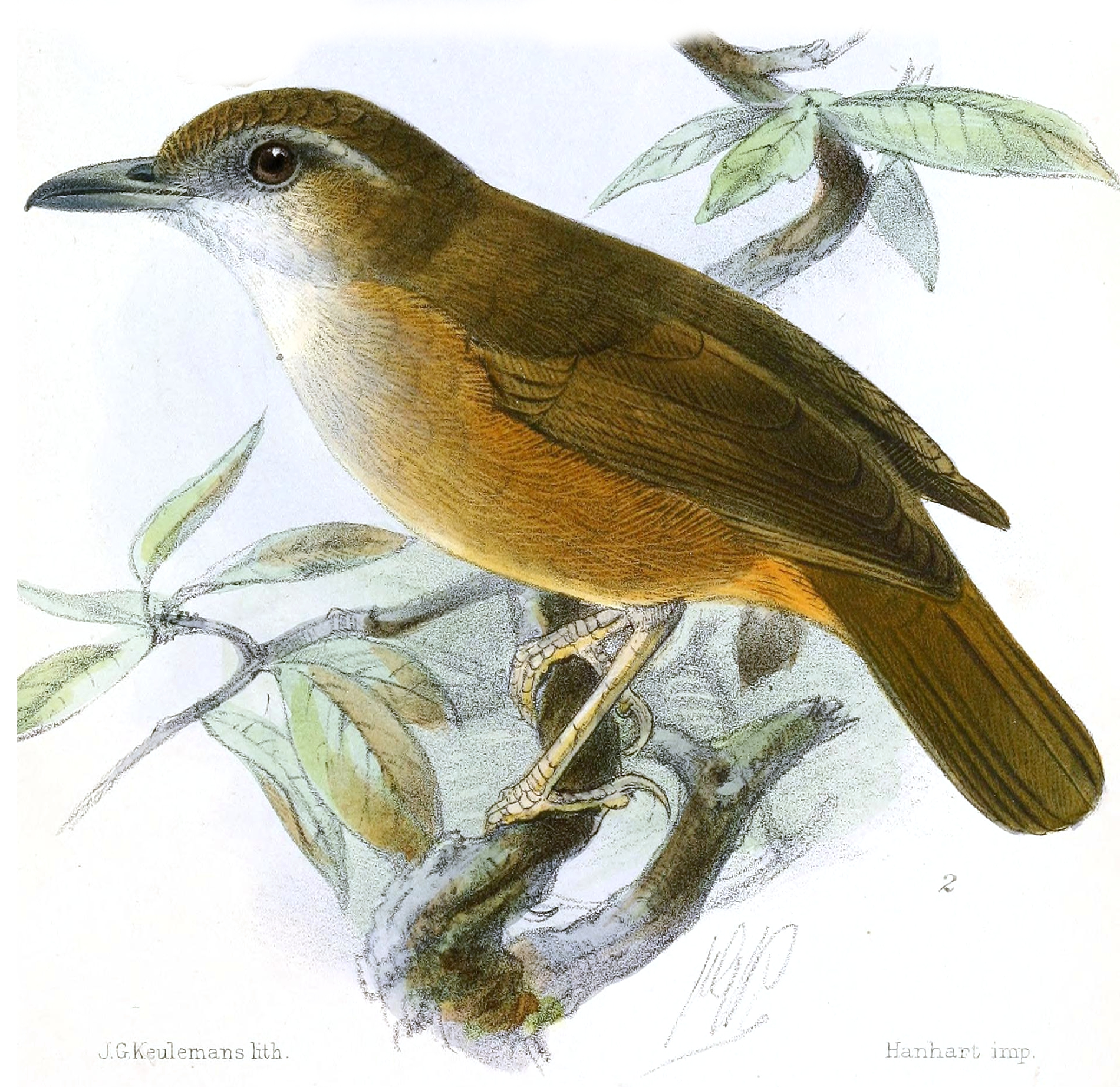
Abbott's babbler

- Birds described in 1887 include African grey flycatcher, crested tit-warbler, scaly-breasted illadopsis, vega gull, Okinawa woodpecker, Ecuadorian cacique, Bornean leafbird, Whitehead's spiderhunter, grey-sided thrush, Slender-tailed woodstar.

== Events ==
- Death of Wilhelm von Wright

== Publications ==
- Fernando Ferrari-Pérez Catalogue of Animals collected by the Geographical and Exploring commission of the Republic of Mexico
- George Ernest Shelley A Review of the Species of the Family Ploceidae of the Ethiopian Region. Ibis 1887 1-47 continuation
- Edward William Nelson Report upon Natural History Collections Made in Alaska between the Years 1877–1881 online
- Montague Chamberlain A Catalogue of Canadian Birds

Ongoing events

- Osbert Salvin and Frederick DuCane Godman 1879–1904. Biologia Centrali-Americana
- Richard Bowdler Sharpe Catalogue of the Birds in the British Museum London, 1874–98.
- Anton Reichenow, Jean Cabanis, and other members of the German Ornithologists' Society in Journal für Ornithologie online BHL
- Ornis; internationale Zeitschrift für die gesammte Ornithologie.Vienna 1885-1905 online BHL
- The Auk online BHL
- The Ibis
