= JFO =

JFO may refer to:

- Joint Fires Observer, in the U.S. military
- Joint Forces Operation, the Ukrainian military counter-offensive in the War in Donbas
- Journal of Field Ornithology, a periodical
- Crissy Field, former U.S. Army airfield in San Francisco
- J. F. Oberlin, noted pastor and namesake of Oberlin College
- Star Wars Jedi: Fallen Order, a 2019 Star Wars video game
