= Tardif =

Tardif is a French surname. Notable people with this name include:

- Alain Tardif (born 1946) Canadian politician
- Chris Tardif (born 1979) British soccer player
- Claudette Tardif (born 1947) Canadian politician
- Denis Tardif, Canadian politician
- Emiliano Tardif (1928–1999) Canadian Roman Catholic missionary
- Graham Tardif, Australian composer
- Guy Tardif (1935–2005), Canadian politician
- Jamie Tardif (born 1985) Canadian ice hockey player
- Jean-Claude Tardif, Canadian cardiologist
- Joseph Tardif (1860–1920) Australian cricketer
- Luc Tardif (born 1953), Canadian-born French ice hockey player and executive
- Luc Tardif Jr. (born 1984) French ice hockey player
- Marc Tardif (born 1949) Canadian ice hockey player
- Marie-Louise Tardif, Canadian politician
- Monique Tardif (1936–2016) Canadian politician
- Patrice Tardif (ice hockey) (born 1970) Canadian ice hockey player
- Patrice Tardif (politician) (1904–1989) Canadian politician
- Paul Tardif (1908–1998) Canadian politician
- Étienne Tardif de Pommeroux de Bordesoulle (1771–1837) French nobleman
- Jean Charles Louis Tardif d'Hamonville (1830–1889) French biologist
- Laurent Duvernay-Tardif (born 1991) Canadian American-football player
- Yanette Delétang-Tardif (1902–1976) French artist

== See also ==
- Tardiff, surname
