= Kimberly G. Smith =

American biologist

Kimberly Gray Smith (July 19, 1948 – April 9, 2018) was an American biologist.

Smith was born to parents Robert and Janet in Manchester, Connecticut. He attended Kimball Union Academy then earned a bachelor's degree from Tufts University before pursuing graduate study at University of Arkansas, Fayetteville and Utah State University. He joined the Fayetteville faculty in 1981, and was named University Professor of Biological Sciences in 2009, and Distinguished Professor six years later. From 2000 to 2004, Smith was editor in chief of The Auk.
