= The Book of Eggs =

2014 book by Mark Hauber

The Book of Eggs: A Life-Size Guide to the Eggs of Six Hundred of the World's Bird Species
- Author: Mark E. Hauber
- Illustrator: Ivan Hissey, Adam Hook, Coral Mula
- Cover artist: John Weinstein
- Language: English
- Subject: Eggs
- Genre: Non-fiction
- Set in: Fournier, News Gothic
- Publisher: The University of Chicago Press, The Ivy Press
- Publication date: March 28, 2014
- Publication place: United States
- Pages: 656

The Book of Eggs: A Life-Size Guide to the Eggs of Six Hundred of the World's Bird Species is a book detailing the eggs of approximately 600 birds authored by Mark Hauber. It has received positive reviews, although it has been criticized for having a North American bias.
