= Tardiff =

Tardiff is a surname. Notable people with the name include:

- George Tardiff (1936–2012), American football coach
- Jil C. Tardiff, American cardiologist
- Larry Tardiff, Canadian politician

== See also ==
- Tardif, surname
