= Ornithological Applications =

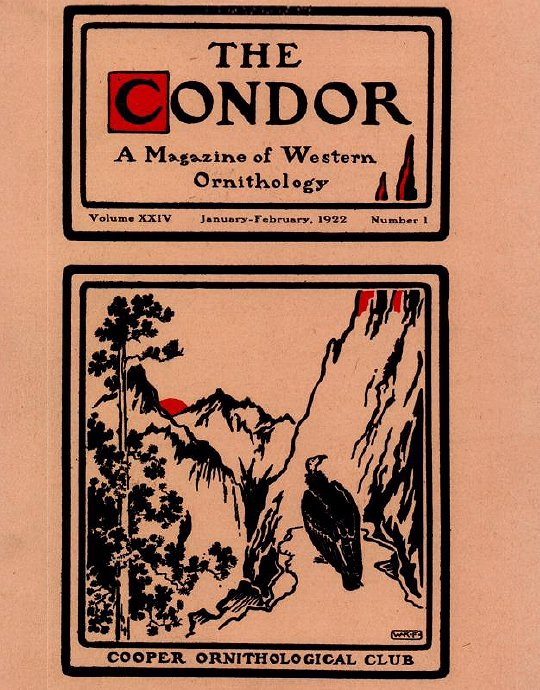
- Discipline: Ornithology
- Language: English
- Edited by: Judit K. Szabo

Publication details
- Former name(s): Bulletin of the Cooper Ornithological Club; The Condor
- History: 1899–present
- Publisher: American Ornithological Society (United States)
- Frequency: Quarterly
- Impact factor: 3.1 (2022)

Standard abbreviations
- ISO 4: Ornithol. Appl.

Indexing
- ISSN: 0010-5422 (print); 1938-5129 (web)

Links
- Journal homepage

Ornithological Applications, formerly The Condor and The Condor: Ornithological Applications, is a peer-reviewed quarterly scientific journal covering ornithology. It is an official journal of the American Ornithological Society.

== History ==
The journal was first published in 1899 as the Bulletin of the Cooper Ornithological Club by the Cooper Ornithological Club (later Cooper Ornithological Society), a California-based ornithological society. In 1900, the journal was renamed as The Condor. It published ornithological research, and through the 1950s, its scope was regional, focusing on the western United States.

An editorial board was established in 1951 to address increasing submissions to the journal. James R. King, editor-in-chief following 1965, instituted an external peer review system. Moreover, King broadened the journal's geographic scope. By 1966, at least 40% of papers published in The Condor were written by scientists outside the United States.

In 2013, The Condor became The Condor: Ornithological Applications, limiting its scope to applied research in ornithology.

In 2016, the Cooper Ornithological Society, publisher of The Condor, merged with the American Ornithologists' Union to form the American Ornithological Society.

In 2018, the American Ornithology Society announced a partnership with Oxford University Press to publish The Condor: Ornithological Applications and The Auk: Ornithological Advances.

In January 2021, The Condor was renamed as Ornithological Applications to make the title more descriptive and clarify its thematic focus and citation. The society's sister publication The Auk was renamed to Ornithology at the same time.

=== Editors-in-chief ===
The following persons are or have been editor-in-chief:

- 1899–1902: Chester Barlow
- 1902–1905: Walter K. Fisher with Joseph Grinnell as Associate Editor
- 1906–1939: Joseph Grinnell
- 1940–1966: Alden H. Miller, Berkeley, CA
- 1966–1968: James R. King, Washington State
- 1969–1973: Ralph J. Raitt, New Mexico State University
- 1973–1974: Francis S. L. Williamson, Smithsonian Institution: Chesapeake Bay Center for Environmental Studies, Edgewater, MD
- 1975–1985: Peter Stettenheim, Lebanon, NH
- 1986–1990: Martin L. Morton, Occidental College, LA
- 1991–1995: Glenn E. Walsberg, Arizona State
- 1996–2000: Walter D. Koenig, Hastings Reservation
- 2001–2008: David S. Dobkin, High Desert Ecological Research Institute, Bend, OR
- 2009–2013: Michael A. Patten, University of Oklahoma
- 2013–2019: Philip C Stouffer, Louisiana State University
- 2019–2024: Catherine A. Lindell, Michigan State University
- 2024–present: Judit K. Szabo, Charles Darwin University

== See also ==
- List of ornithology journals
