= 1899 in birding and ornithology =

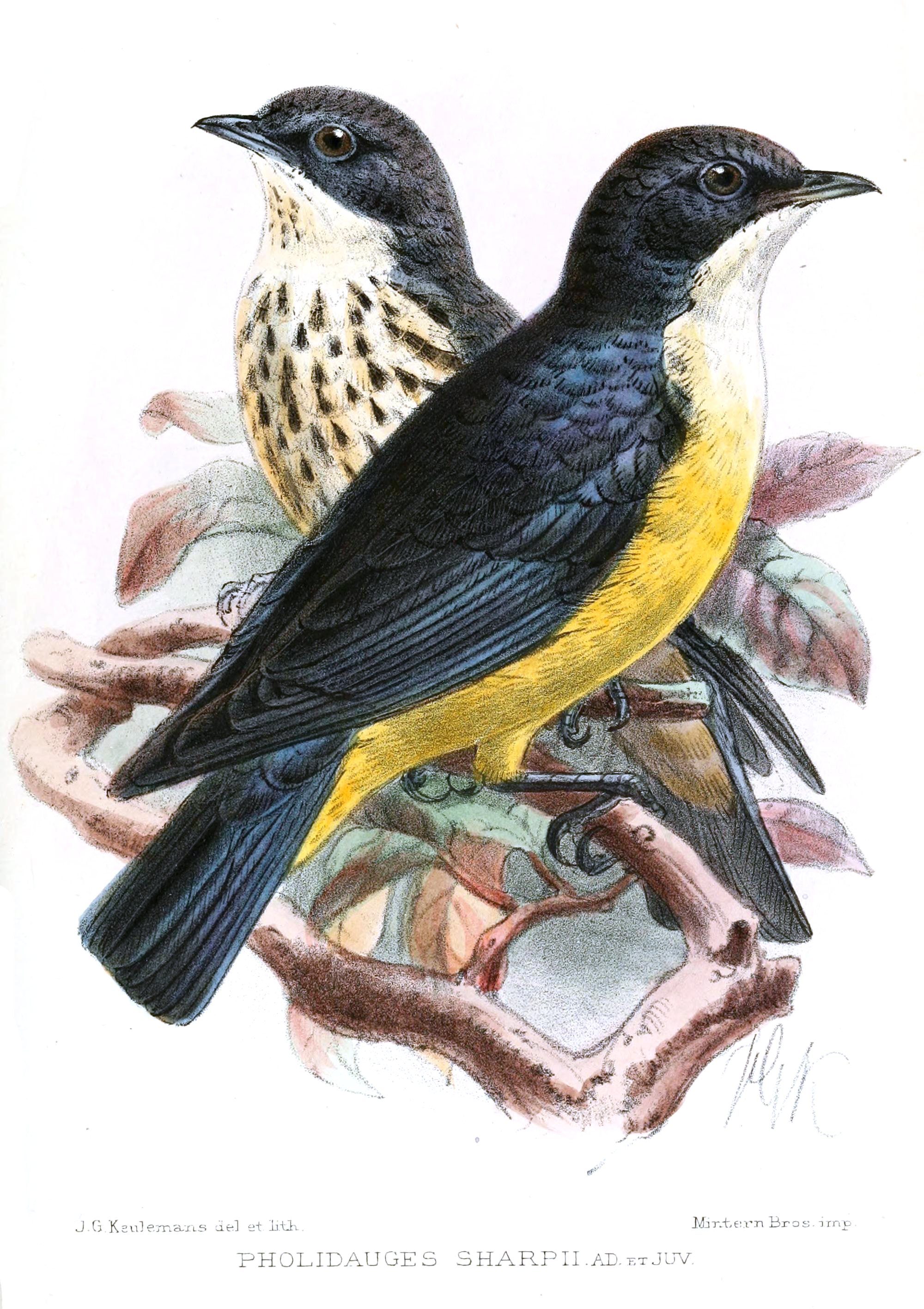
Sharpe's starling Ibis 1899

- Birds described in 1899 include tiny sunbird, brown-rumped tapaculo, golden-backed whistler, grey-necked rockfowl, Corsican finch, Dohrn's thrush-babbler, forest double-collared sunbird, tawny-backed fantail, Socotra bunting, rufous-cheeked laughingthrush, white-winged magpie, Vanuatu kingfisher, star-spotted nightjar

== Events ==
- Death of John Whitehead, Louis d'Hamonville, Carl Constantin Platen, Elliott Coues, Joseph Wolf
- Harriman Alaska expedition
- William Louis Abbott begins exploring the islands of Maritime Southeast Asia on the schooner "Terrapin" often accompanied by Cecil Boden Kloss.
- Einar Lönnberg explores the Caspian Sea.
- Harry Forbes Witherby devotes himself to ornithology

== Publications ==
- Richard Bowdler Sharpe A hand-list of the genera and species of birds : nomenclator avium tum fossilium tum viventium.London :Trustees of the British Museum 1899–1909.online BHL
- Émile Oustalet, 1899 Oiseaux du Cambodge, du Laos, de l'Annam et du Tonkin, (Birds of Cambodia, Laos, Annam and Tonkin).
- Howard Saunders Illustrated Manual of British Birds London, Gurney and Jackson online BHL
- Robert Hall A key to the birds of Australia and Tasmania with their geographical distribution in Australia Melbourne, Melville, Mullen and Slade, [pref 1899] online BHL
- Outram Bangs The hummingbirds of the Santa Marta Region of Colombia American Ornithologists' Union, New York (1899) online
- Anton Reichenow (1899) Die Vögel der Bismarckinseln Mitteilungen aus dem Zoologischen Museum Berlin – 1_3: 1 - 106.online Zobodat
- R.B. and J.D.S. Woodward.Natal birds:including the species belonging to Natal and the eastern districts of the Cape Colony Pietermaritzburg : P. Davis, 1899.
- Ernst Hartert and Walter Rothschild A Review of the Ornithology of the Galapagos Islands, with Notes on the Webster-Harris Expedition. By the Hon. Walter Rothschild, and Ernst Hartert.Nov. Zoolvi. p. 85 (1899)

Ongoing events

- Osbert Salvin and Frederick DuCane Godman 1879–1904. Biologia Centrali-Americana. Aves
- Members of the German Ornithologists' Society in Journal für Ornithologie online BHL
- The Ibis
- Novitates Zoologicae
- Ornithologische Monatsberichte Verlag von R. Friedländer & Sohn, Berlin. Years of publication: 1893–1938 online Zobodat
- Ornis; internationale Zeitschrift für die gesammte Ornithologie.Vienna 1885-1905 online BHL
- The Auk online BHL
