= Thomas McIlwraith (ornithologist) =

Canadian businessman and ornithologist

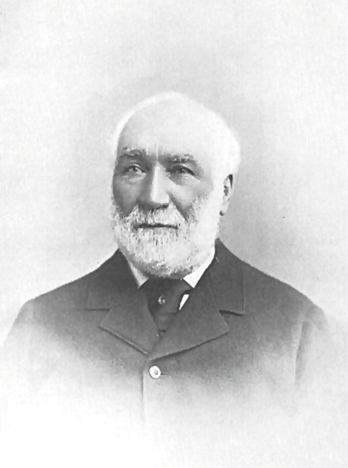

Thomas McIlwraith (December 26, 1824 – January 31, 1903) was a Canadian ornithologist and businessman. The outdoor natural history organization McIlwraith Field Naturalists of London, Ontario was named in his honour in 1902. He was one of the founding members of the American Ornithologists' Union.

== Biography ==
McIlwraith was born in Newton upon Ayr, Scotland to Thomas McIlwraith, a weaver, and Jean Adair Forsyth. He was the seventh of ten children. In 1846 he moved to Edinburgh where he studied for three years and he returned to his hometown and briefly apprenticed as a cabinet maker before taking up work in the management of the Newton Gas Works. In October 1853 he married Mary, daughter of Baillie Hugh Park and moved to Hamilton, Canada the next month. He worked in the Hamilton Gas Light Company until 1871 after which he owned the commercial wharf and managed the coal transport business. Growing into a major businessman, he also held positions on the boards of banks and insurance companies. In 1878 he was a member of the Hamilton City Council.

A mounted collection of birds including a flicker and a kingfisher that he saw created an interest in birds and he started making a collection of the birds of Hamilton. In 1860 he published a list of the birds of Hamilton. Ernest Thompson Seton borrowed specimens from McIlwraith for his art studies. McIlwraith also exchanged specimens with other collectors in North America. Although not formally trained in science he gained a reputation and became the vice-president in 1860, and later in 1880 president, of the Hamilton Association for the Advancement of Literature, Science, and Art. Along with William Edwin Saunders and Montague Chamberlain he was one of the three Canadian founding members of the American Ornithologists' Union established in New York. He published The Birds of Ontario in 1886, a landmark study that examined the 302 species of bird within a six-mile zone around the Hamilton city limits. He also gave popular lectures on birds. In 1890 McIlwraith was invited to work on a bird book for the country by the Geological Survey of Canada but the project was aborted.

He died in Hamilton in 1903. His collections are part of the Royal Ontario Museum.
