= Chester Barlow =

American cashier and amateur ornithologist

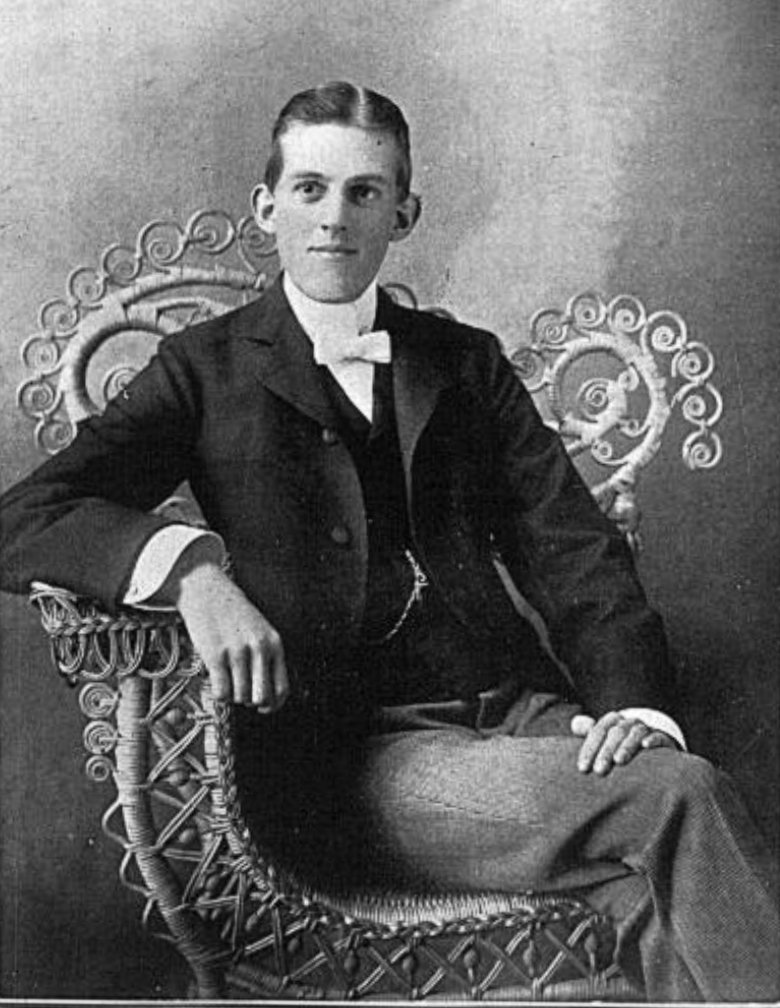

Chester Barlow (24 June 1874 – 9 November 1902) was an American cashier and amateur ornithologist who worked in California. He served as the secretary of the Cooper Ornithological Club and he encouraged others to publish in its bulletin on aspects of breeding of the local birds. He also served as the editor for the journals Oologist, The Nidiologist and The Condor.

Barlow was born in San Jose to Charles Bennett Barlow and Syrena M. Nye. After studying at the local high school he worked as a cashier at the Santa Clara Valley Bank in Santa Clara. He became a member of the Cooper Ornithological Club where he, along with other members of the organization, studied the birds of California.

Barlow documented the birds of the Sierras and the Farallon Islands apart from more local studies.

The south Californian subspecies of the chestnut-backed chickadee (Poecile rufescens barlowi) was named after him by Joseph Grinnell in 1900.
