= Frederick Webb Headley =

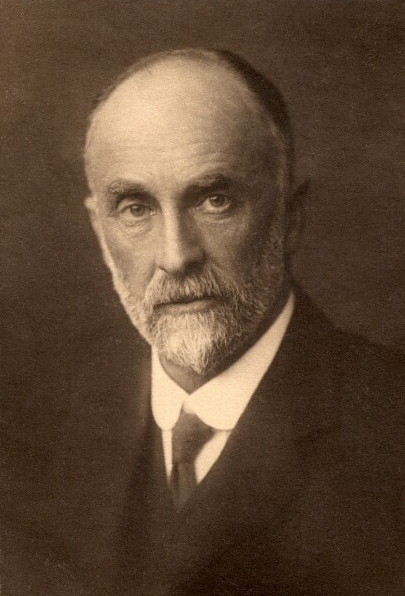
Frederick Webb Headley (1914) by George Charles Beresford

Frederick Webb Headley (10 April 1856 – 25 November 1919) was an English educator, naturalist, and author of books on evolution and Darwinism. He was a master at Haileybury College where he was involved in establishing the natural history museum and inculcating an interest in natural history among students.

== Life and work ==
Frederick was the second son of Rev. Henry Headley, of Brinsop Vicarage, Herefordshire. He was educated at Harrow School and the Caius College, University of Cambridge, graduating first class in the Classical Tripos in 1878, later appointed Assistant Master at Haileybury College, Hertfordshire, by Edward Bradby where he remained until shortly before his death in Epsom following an operation. He resigned his mastership in July 1914 and sought to make a trip to Sudan but World War I ended the plan and he volunteered during the war. and returned to Haileybury. He knew French and German and took an interest in art, literature, music and natural history. He had a special interest in bird flight and while at Haileybury he was involved in organizing the natural history museum and the running of the Haileybury natural history society.

Headley followed the ideas of Conwy Lloyd Morgan on bird behaviour being largely instinctive and dismissed anthropomorphism. The Fabian Society invited him in 1903 where he argued that socialism was incompatible with Darwinian evolutionary theory.

Headley was a member of the British Ornithologists' Union and a Fellow of the Zoological Society of London. A keen alpinist he was a member of the Alpine Club and took an interest in the birds of the Swiss alps, apart from making trips to Algeria, Spain, the Baltic islands and Texel.

== Bibliography ==
- The Structure and Life of Birds, London and New York, Macmillan and Co. (1895)
- Problems of Evolution, London, Duckworth (1900)
- Fauna and Flora of Haileybury, Hartford, Stephen Austin (1902)
- Life and evolution, London: Duckworth (1906)
- Darwinism and Modern Socialism, London, Methuen (1909)
- The Flight of Birds, London, Witherby & Co. (1912)
- The Country Round Haileybury, Cambridge, University Press (private printing, 1920)

This last title was left unfinished at Headley's death; it was completed for the press by W. Kennedy, who also added a second section on local history and antiquities.
