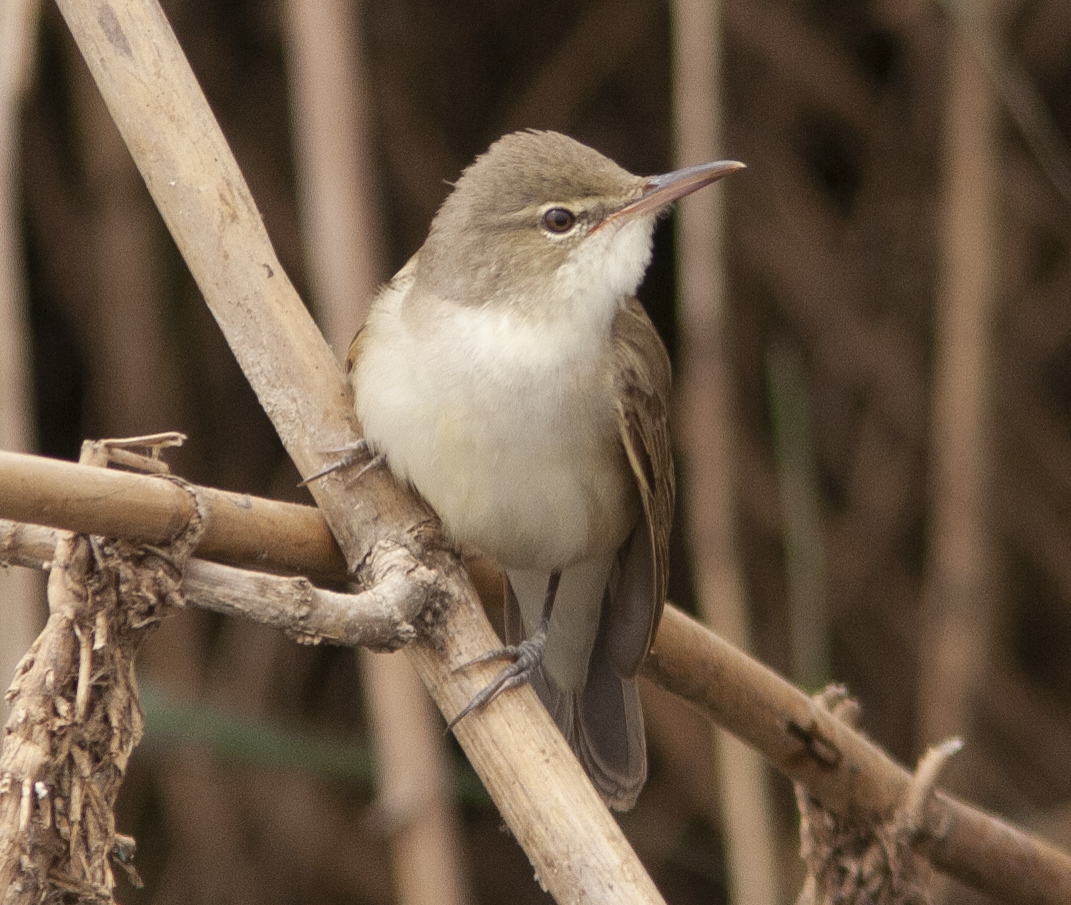

Conservation status
- Endangered (IUCN 3.1)

Scientific classification
- Kingdom: Animalia
- Phylum: Chordata
- Class: Aves
- Order: Passeriformes
- Family: Acrocephalidae
- Genus: Acrocephalus
- Species: A. griseldis

Binomial name
- Acrocephalus griseldis (Hartlaub, 1891)
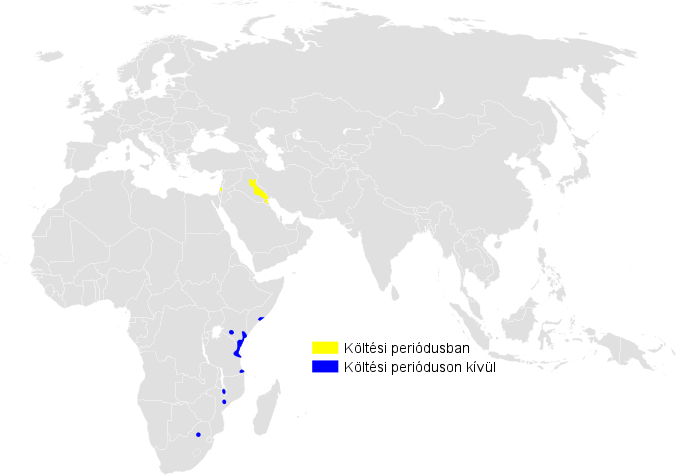
- Distribution of Basra reed warbler Breeding Non-breeding

= Basra reed warbler =

Species of bird

The Basra reed warbler (Acrocephalus griseldis) is a "warbler" of the genus Acrocephalus. It is a near-endemic breeder in the Tigris–Euphrates river system in southwestern Iran, eastern and southern Iraq, and Kuwait, though it has also recently colonised wetlands in Israel. It breeds in extensive beds of papyrus and reeds. It is easily mistaken for the great reed warbler but is a bit smaller, has whiter underparts and has a narrower, longer and more pointed bill. It is migratory, wintering in East Africa. It is a very rare vagrant in Europe. The call is a gruff chaar, deeper than that of a common reed warbler.

It is found in aquatic vegetation in or around shallow, fresh or brackish water, still or flowing, mainly in dense reedbeds. It is found in thickets and bushland when migrating or wintering.

In 2007, the species was discovered as a breeding bird in northern Israel.

Due to the drainage of the Mesopotamian marshes throughout the 1980s and the 1990s, and the subsequent near destruction of its native habitat, the Basra reed warbler is considered an endangered species.
