= Journal of Field Ornithology =

- Discipline: Ornithology
- Language: English
- Edited by: Mark Hauber

Publication details
- History: 1925-present
- Publisher: Association of Field Ornithologists (United States)
- Frequency: Quarterly
- Impact factor: 0.9 (2022)

Standard abbreviations
- ISO 4: J. Field Ornithol.

Indexing
- ISSN: 0273-8570 (print); 1557-9263 (web)
- LCCN: sc85005130
- OCLC no.: 48412068

Links
- Journal homepage

The Journal of Field Ornithology, formerly Bulletin of the Northeastern Bird-Banding Association and Bird Banding, is a peer-reviewed scientific journal. Established in 1925 and published quarterly, it covers ornithology.

== History ==
The journal was first published as the Bulletin of the Northeastern Bird-Banding Association (1925-1929; primarily regional) and Bird Banding (1930-1979; global scope). While many of the journal's early articles reported on advances in the practice of bird banding, it has welcomed broader ornithological contributions since its first issue in 1925.

The journal, previously published by Wiley, became open access in 2022 through a partnership with Resilience Alliance. The journal accepts articles addressing the "descriptive or experimental study of birds in their natural habitats," including studies of field techniques, conservation, life history, and assessments of existing studies and ideas.

== See also ==
- List of ornithology journals
