= Mark Hauber =

Ornithologist

Mark Erno Hauber
- Education: University of Auckland; Yale College; Cornell University; Victoria University of Wellington
- Scientific career
- Thesis: Cognitive challenges for brood-parasitic cowbirds : species recognition and host discrimination (2002)
- Website: Cowbird Lab

Mark Erno Hauber is an American ornithologist and Endowed Professor at the University of Illinois Urbana-Champaign. His research considers the development of avian recognition systems.

== Early life and education ==
Hauber was born and raised in Hungary. He has said that he always wanted to become an ornithologist. He attended high school in Italy, before moving to the United States for college. Hauber was an undergraduate student at Yale College, where he majored in organismal biology. He started focusing on birds, and the differences between the brains of different species. He worked toward his doctorate at the Cornell University, where he studied brood parasitic cowbirds. After graduating, Hauber moved to the University of California, Berkeley as a postdoctoral research fellow.

== Research and career ==
In 2003, Hauber moved to New Zealand, where he joined the faculty at the University of Auckland. Whilst in New Zealand, he studied psychology, and earned a Doctor of Science on avian recognition systems. His doctoral thesis for this degree was entitled Cognitive ecology of avian recognition systems : studies of brood parasitic and parental taxa. He returned to the United States in 2009, where he joined the faculty at Graduate Center of the City University of New York. Here he oversaw the biopsychology and behavioural neuroscience program.

Hauber was appointed to the faculty at the University of Illinois Urbana-Champaign in 2017. He established the Cowbird Laboratory, which investigates the evolution of recognition systems. For example, Hauber has studied the color and shape of eggs that "host" birds will accept in their nests. He has shown that pointy eggs are more likely to survive being in a bird's cliffside nest. Hauber focused his research on parasitic birds and the impact of climate change. He showed that in unstable climates, distributing eggs amongst a variety of different nests made a species more resilient. Hauber studies the birds that live in tree farms in East Urbana, Illinois.

== Selected publications ==
- Joanna K Hubbard; J. Albert C. Uy; Mark E Hauber; Hopi Hoekstra; Rebecca J Safran (8 April 2010). "Vertebrate pigmentation: from underlying genes to adaptive function". Trends in Genetics. 26 (5): 231–239. doi:10.1016/j.tig.2010.02.002. ISSN 0168-9525. PMID 20381892. Wikidata Q37728546.
- Kevin J McGraw; Emiko A Mackillop; James Dale; Mark E Hauber (1 December 2002). "Different colors reveal different information: how nutritional stress affects the expression of melanin- and structurally based ornamental plumage". The Journal of Experimental Biology. 205 (Pt 23): 3747–3755. ISSN 0022-0949. PMID 12409501. Wikidata Q48616134.
- Hauber ME; Sherman PW (1 October 2001). "Self-referent phenotype matching: theoretical considerations and empirical evidence". Trends in Neurosciences. 24 (10): 609–616. doi:10.1016/s0166-2236(00)01916-0. ISSN 0166-2236. PMID 11576676. Wikidata Q34384297.

=== Books ===
- The Book of Eggs Hauber, Mark E. (2014). The book of eggs : a lifesize guide to the eggs of six hundred of the world's bird species. John Weinstein, John Bates, Barbara Becker. Chicago. ISBN 978-0-226-05778-1. OCLC 860757198.

== Personal life ==
Hauber came out as gay after moving to the United States. He is a member of the grassroots organization 500 Queer Scientists.
