= 1896 in birding and ornithology =

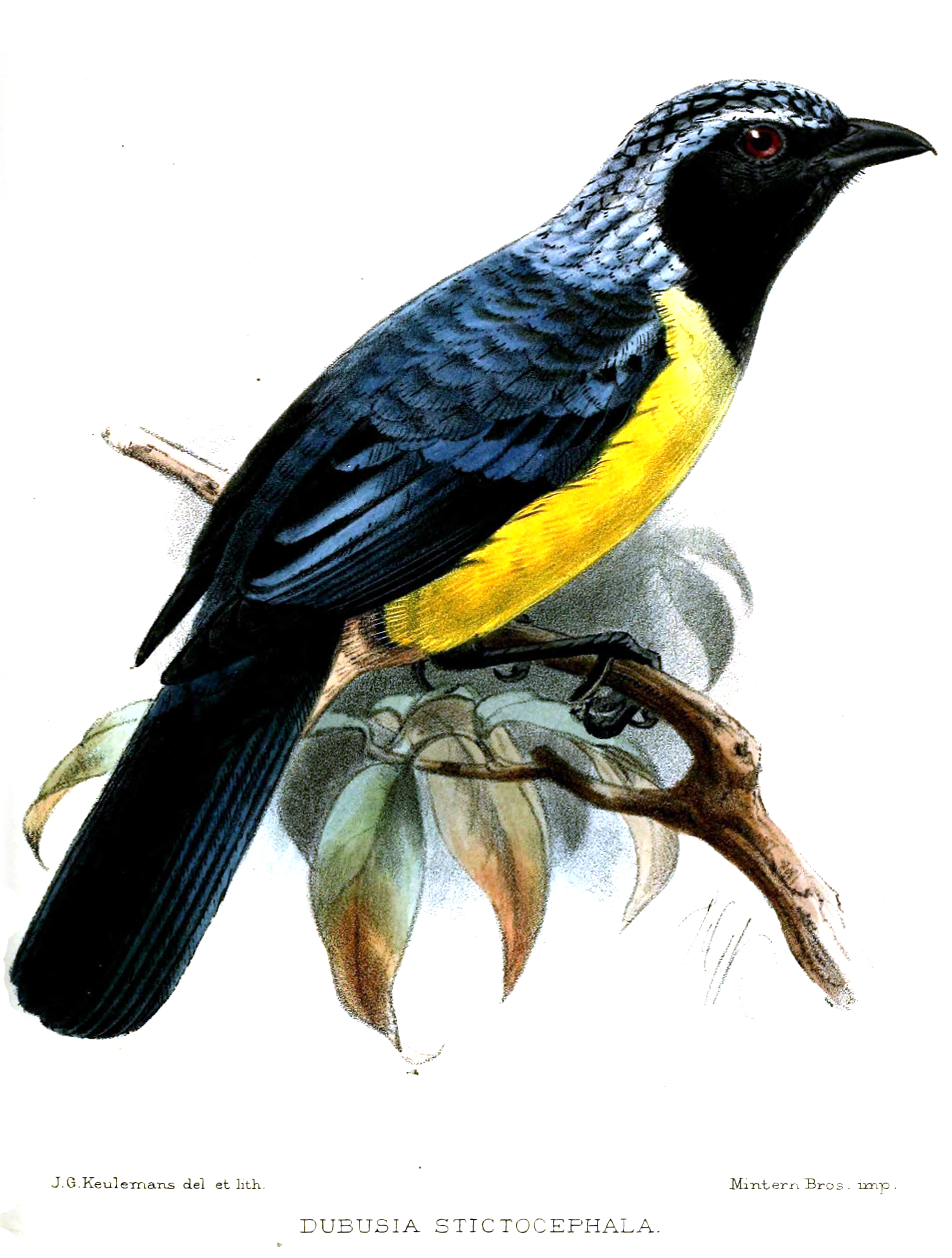
Buff-breasted mountain tanager Proceedings of the Zoological Society of London 1896

- Birds described in 1896 include black-fronted bushshrike, buff-faced scrubwren, coppery-tailed coucal, crested white-eye, Madagascar plover, orange-billed lorikeet, Ruspoli's turaco, Visayan pygmy babbler, Storm's stork, green-headed oriole

== Events ==
- Death of Juan Gundlach, Henry Barnes-Lawrence, John Stanislaw Kubary,
- Henry Seebohm bequeaths his collection of bird-skins to the British Museum

== Publications ==
- Richard Bowdler Sharpe A Hand-Book to the Birds of Great Britain. (4 volumes). London: Edward Lloyd. 1896–1897.
- George Ernest Shelley The birds of Africa, comprising all the species which occur in the Ethiopian region (1896-1912, 5 vols). London, Published for the author by R.H. Porter (18 Princes Street, Cavendish Square, W.),1896-1912.online BHL
- John Cordeaux Order Anseres in Arthur Gardiner Butler British Birds with their Nests and Eggs in six volumes Brumby & Clarke Ltd. 1896 Hull / London online BHL
- Ernst Hartert An Account of the Collections of Birds made by Mr. William Doherty in the Eastern Archipelago. Novitates Zoologicae iii. p. 537, 1896 online BHL

Ongoing events

- Osbert Salvin and Frederick DuCane Godman 1879–1904. Biologia Centrali-Americana . Aves
- Richard Bowdler Sharpe Catalogue of the Birds in the British Museum London,1874-98.
- Eugene W. Oates and William Thomas Blanford 1889–1898. The Fauna of British India, Including Ceylon and Burma. Vols. I-IV. Birds.
- Anton Reichenow, Jean Cabanis, and other members of the German Ornithologists' Society in Journal für Ornithologie online BHL
- The Ibis
- Novitates Zoologicae
- Ornithologische Monatsberichte Verlag von R. Friedländer & Sohn, Berlin.1893–1938 online Zobodat
- Ornis; internationale Zeitschrift für die gesammte Ornithologie.Vienna 1885-1905 online BHL
- The Auk online BHL
