= 1900 in birding and ornithology =

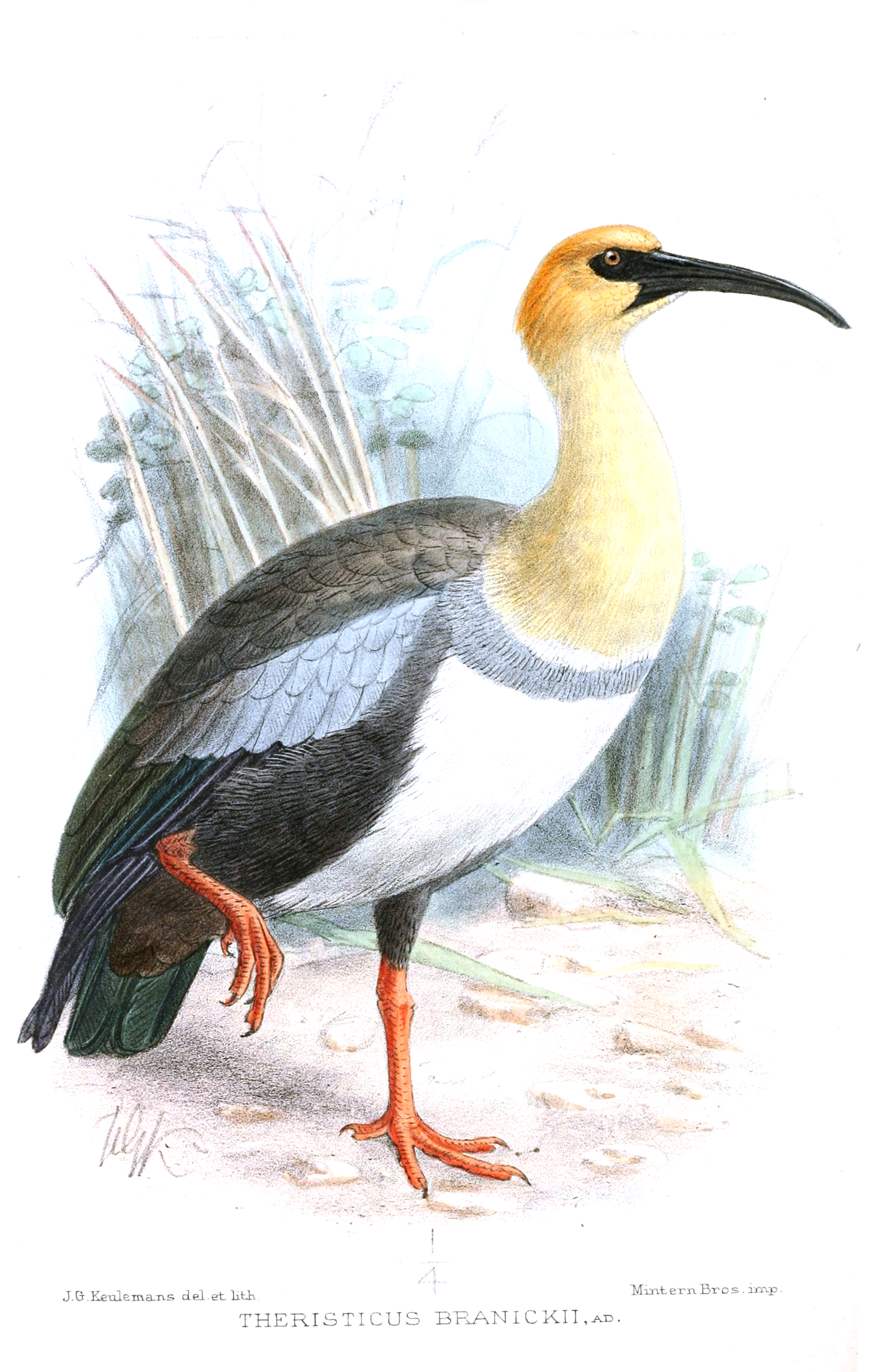
Andean ibis Ibis 1900

- Birds described in 1900 include Abd al-Kuri sparrow, brown oriole, montane widowbird, Negros bleeding-heart pigeon, Newell's shearwater, Papuan parrotfinch, Pitcairn reed warbler, scarlet-faced liocichla, white-headed bulbul

== Events ==
- Death of Gustav Hartlaub, Edmond de Sélys Longchamps
- Johannes Thienemann attends the German Ornithological Society's 50th anniversary celebration in Leipzig in 1900 and gives a lecture that persuades the Society to establish Rossitten Bird Observatory.

== Publications ==
- Robert Warren and Richard J. Ussher, The Birds of Ireland. An account of the distribution, migrations and habits of birds as observed in Ireland, with all additions to the Irish list. Gurney and Jackson, London. (1900).online BHL
- Charles Dixon The story of the birds : being an introduction to the study of ornithology.London :George Allen,1900. online BHL
- Ernst Hartert On the birds of Buru, being a list of collections made on that island by Messrs. William Doherty and Dumas. Novitates Zoologicae 7. 226–242, 1 pl.
- Bocage, J.V.B. du (1900) - Aves do archipelago de Cabo Verde. Jornal de Sciencias Mathematicas, Physicas e Naturaes, Segunda Série, VI (21): 39–47.
- Ettore Arrigoni degli Oddi Elenco degli Uccelli rari o piti difficili ad aversi conservati nella sua Collezione Ornitologica Italiana al 31 Dicembre, 1898. Pel Prof. Ettore Arrigoni degli Oddi. Ornis, ix. p. 199. [4500 specimens - 179 species enumerated]
- Emile Oustalet Catalogue des Oiseaux du Dahomey remis par M. Miegemarque au Muséum d’Histoire Naturelle, en 1895. Par E. Oustalet. Bull. Mus. d’Hist. Nat. Paris, iv. p. 361.
- Henry Seebohm A Monograph of the Turdidae, or Family of Thrushes. By the late Henry Seebohm Edited and completed (after the Author's death) by R. Bowdler Sharpe Part IX. Imperial 4to. London : Henry Sotheran & Co., 1900
- Anton Reichenow Die Vögel Afrikas Neudamm, J. Neumann,1900-05 online BHL
- Émil Goeldi Album de Avea Amazonicas Zürich:Impressão do Instituto Polygraphico a.g.,1900-06. online BHL

Ongoing events

- Osbert Salvin and Frederick DuCane Godman 1879–1904. Biologia Centrali-Americana . Aves
- Members of the German Ornithologists' Society in Journal für Ornithologie online BHL
- The Ibis
- Novitates Zoologicae
- Ornithologische Monatsberichte Verlag von R. Friedländer & Sohn, Berlin. Years of publication: 1893–1938 online Zobodat
- Ornis; internationale Zeitschrift für die gesammte Ornithologie.Vienna 1885-1905online BHL
- The Auk online BHL
