= Louis d'Hamonville =

French ornithologist (1830–1899)

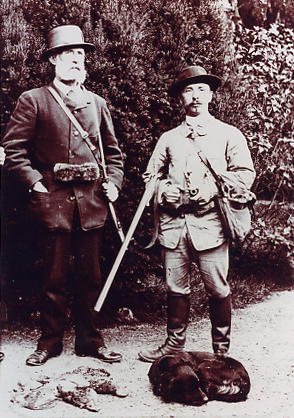
Louis d'Hamonville (right) and his gamekeeper

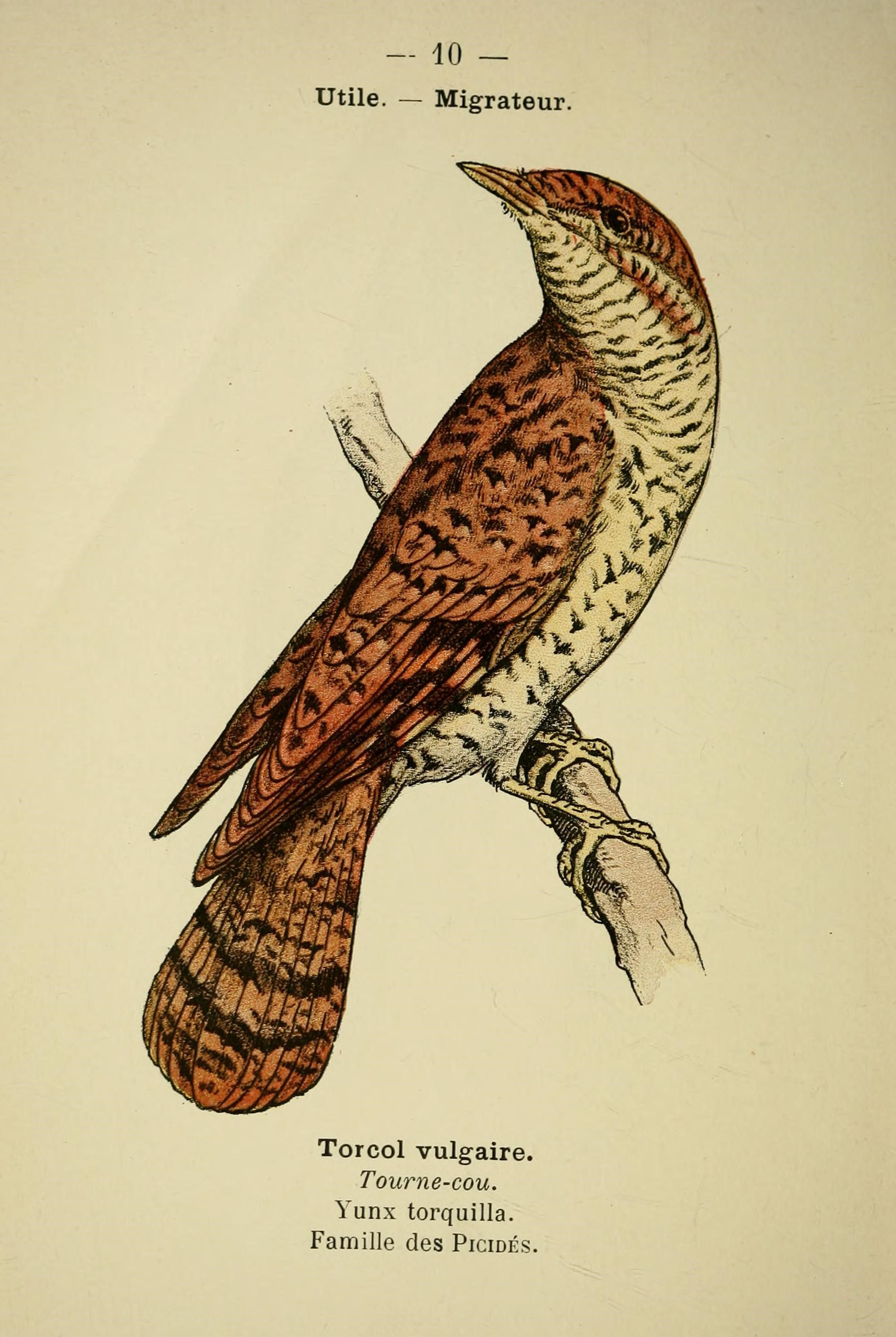
Jynx torquilla "Atlas de poche des oiseaux de France, Belgique et Suisse"

Baron Jean Charles Louis Tardif d'Hamonville (30 August 1830 in Saint-Mihiel – 1899), was a French ornithologist and conchologist, and the author of a number of books on natural history. He was mayor of the town and lived at the Château de Manonville. He was the son of Antoine Edouard Tardif d'Hamonville (1797–1865) and Barbe Louise Barrois (1800- ).

He is best known for his book "Atlas de poche des oiseaux de France, Belgique et Suisse, utiles ou nuisibles – Suivi d'une étude d'ensemble sur les oiseaux" first published in 1898. Comprising 72 chromolithograph plates and 153 pages of text written by d'Hamonville, it showed the common names in French and Latin. It dealt with the taxonomy of birds, advice on collecting, and the role of birds in the wild.

He was also the author of

- "Description d'espèces nouvelles de Coquilles du Tonkin et observations sur quelques autres mollusques de la même région" – Ph. Dautzenberg & Baron L. d'Hamonville / Paris : Ph. Dautzenberg, 1887
- "La vie des oiseaux – scènes d'apres nature" – Baron d'Hamonville / Paris : J.-B. Baillière et fils, 1890
- "Voeu tendant à la suppression de la petite chasse dans toute la France" – M. d'Hamonville / Nancy : impr. de Berger-Levrault, 1892
- "Les Oiseaux utiles de la France" – Baron d'Hamonville / Versailles : impr. de Cerf, 1896

He was married in 1858 to Louise du Bouëxic de Pinieux (1839–1893). They had two children, Marie Tardif d'Hamonville (born ca. 1860) married in 1885 to François René Boucher de Morlaincourt, Général de Brigade (1853–1937), and another child born ca. 1862.
