= 1891 in birding and ornithology =

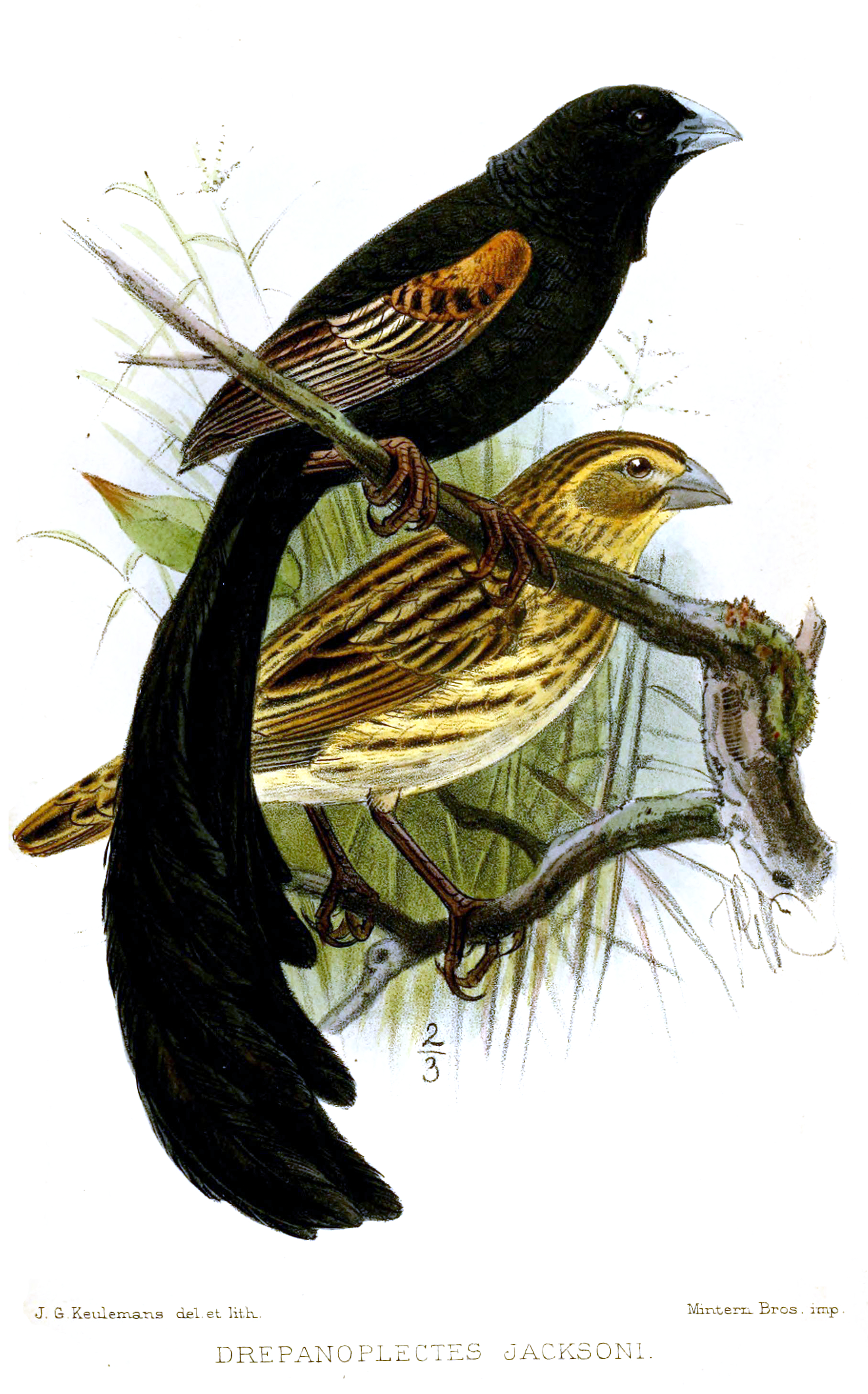
Jackson's widowbird Ibis 1891

- Birds described in 1891 include Basra reed warbler, Cape shoveler, charming hummingbird, cobalt-winged parakeet, Lord Howe parakeet, Kermadec red-crowned parakeet, Pangani longclaw, Patagonian yellow finch, Père David's tit,

== Events ==
- Peary expedition to Greenland
- Joseph joins the British Ornithologists' Union
- Death of August von Pelzeln
- Giacomo Damiani joins forces with Enrico Giglioli

== Publications ==
- Ernst Hartert Katalog der Vogelsammlung in Museum der Senckenbergischen Naturforschenden Gesellschaft in Frankfurt am Main Frankfurt a.M., Knauer,1891. online
- Tommaso Salvadori, 1891. Catalogue of birds in the British Museum. Vol. 20. British Museum, London.
- Valentin Bianchi 1891 The birds of Gansu expedition of G.N. Potanin 1884–1887 (with Mikhail Mikhailovich Berezovsky)
- Richard Bowdler Sharpe Monograph of the Paradiseidae, or Birds of Paradise, and Ptilonorhynchidae, or Bower-birds. (2 volumes). London: Henry Sotheran. 1891–1898. online BHL

Ongoing events

- Osbert Salvin and Frederick DuCane Godman 1879–1904. Biologia Centrali-Americana . Aves
- Richard Bowdler Sharpe Catalogue of the Birds in the British Museum London,1874-98.
- Eugene W. Oates and William Thomas Blanford 1889–1898. The Fauna of British India, Including Ceylon and Burma. Vols. I-IV. Birds.
- Anton Reichenow, Jean Cabanis, and other members of the German Ornithologists' Society in Journal für Ornithologie online BHL
- The Ibis
- Ornis; internationale Zeitschrift für die gesammte Ornithologie.Vienna 1885-1905 online BHL
- The Auk online BHL
