= Novitates Zoologicae =

- Discipline: Zoology
- Language: English, German
- Edited by: Lionel Walter Rothschild

Publication details
- History: 1894–1948
- Publisher: Tring Museum

Standard abbreviations
- ISO 4: Novit. Zool.

Indexing
- ISSN: 0950-7655

Links
- Online archive

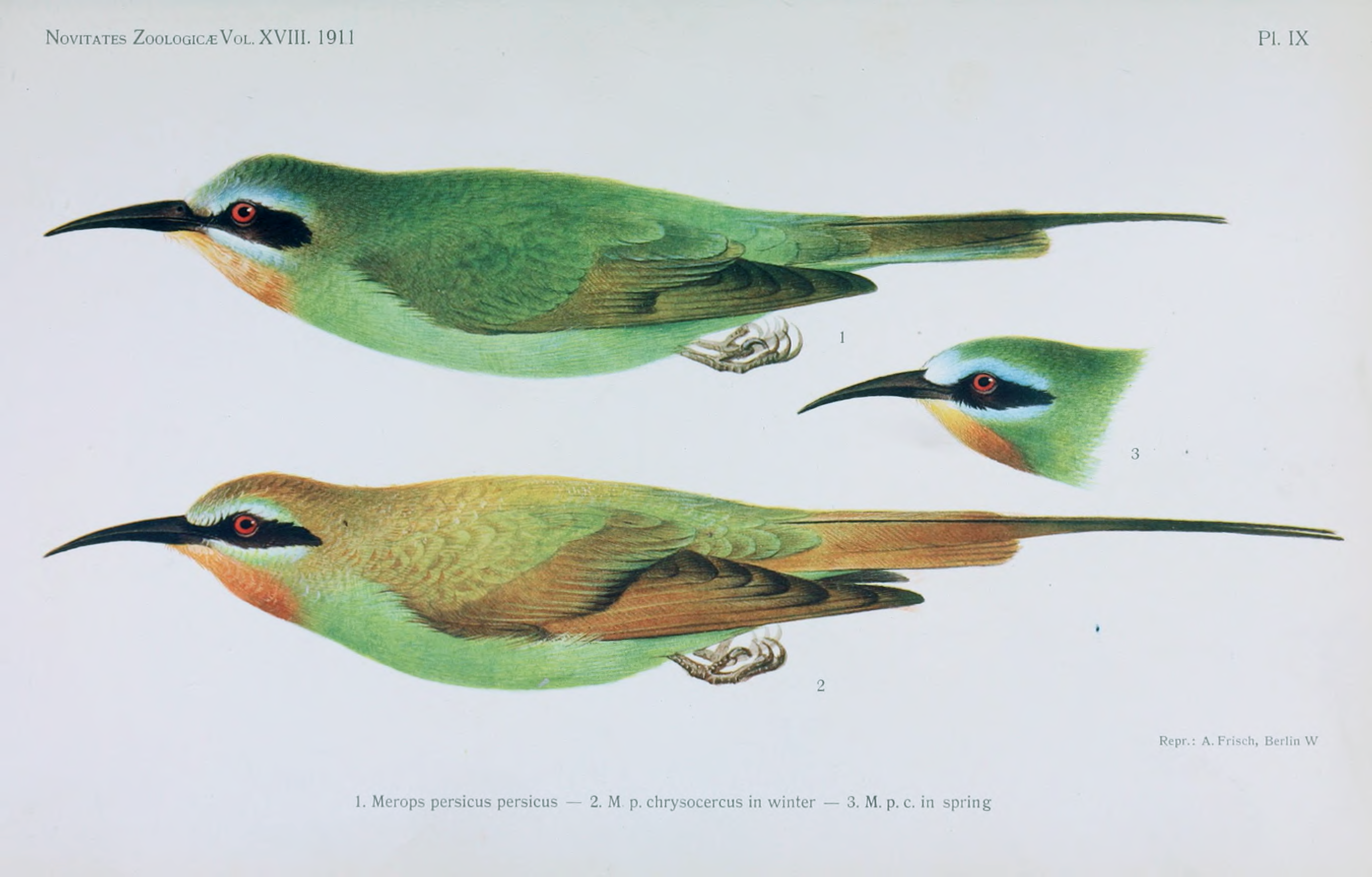
Novitates Zoologicae vol XVII 1911 Plate 9 blue-cheeked bee-eater, 2. in winter, 3. in spring

Novitates Zoologicae: A Journal of Zoology in Connection With the Tring Museum was a British scientific journal devoted to systematic zoology. It was edited by Lionel Walter Rothschild and published between 1894 and 1948 by the Tring Museum. Articles were mainly in English, but some were in German. It was succeeded by the Bulletin of the British Museum (Natural History), Zoology Series.
