= Ornithology (journal) =

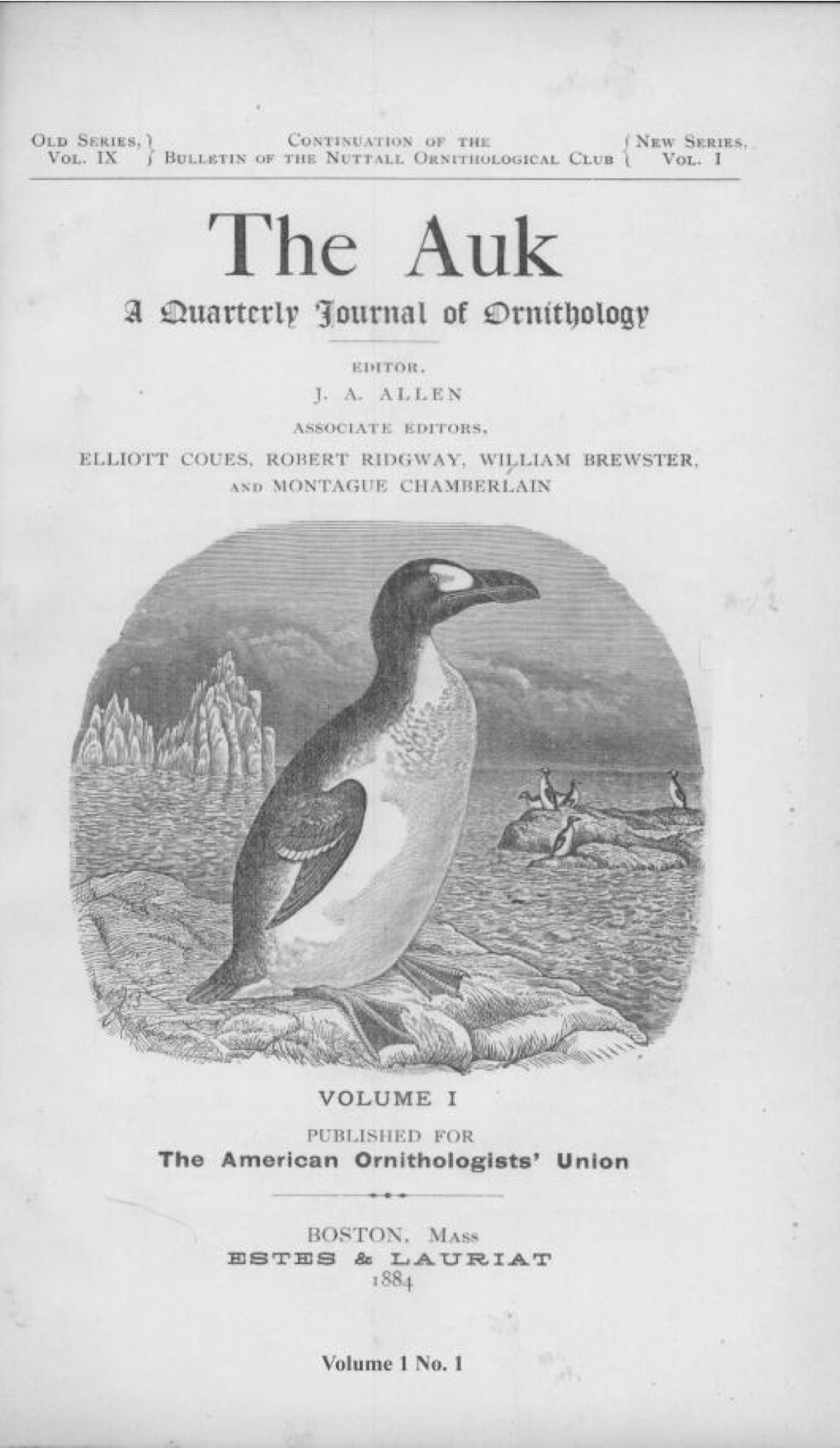
- Discipline: Ornithology
- Language: English
- Edited by: T. Scott Sillett

Publication details
- Former name: The Auk
- History: 1884–present
- Publisher: American Ornithological Society (United States)
- Frequency: Weekly
- Impact factor: 2.659 (2018)

Standard abbreviations
- ISO 4: Ornithology

Indexing
- CODEN: AUKJAF
- ISSN: 0004-8038 (print); 1938-4254 (web)
- LCCN: sf79010123
- JSTOR: 00048038
- OCLC no.: 636759596

Links
- Journal homepage

Ornithology, formerly The Auk and The Auk: Ornithological Advances, is a peer-reviewed scientific journal and the official publication of the American Ornithological Society (AOS). It was established in 1884 and is published quarterly. The journal covers the anatomy, behavior, and distribution of birds. It was named for the great auk, the symbol of the AOS.

In 2018, the American Ornithology Society announced a partnership with Oxford University Press to publish The Auk: Ornithological Advances and The Condor: Ornithological Applications.

In January 2021, the journal was renamed Ornithology, with the stated goal of improving descriptiveness, thematic focus, and ease of citation of the journal title. The society's sister publication The Condor was renamed Ornithological Applications at the same time.

== Editors ==
The following have been editors-in-chief of the journal:

- T. Scott Sillett (Smithsonian Institution) 2018–present
- Mark E. Hauber (University of Illinois) 2013–2018
- Michael Murphy (Portland State University) 2010–2013
- Spencer G. Sealy (University of Manitoba) 2005–2009
- Kimberly G. Smith (University of Arkansas) 2000–2004
- Thomas E. Martin (University of Montana) 1997–1999
- Gary D. Schnell (University of Oklahoma) 1991–1996
- Alan Brush (University of Connecticut) 1985–1990
- John A. Wiens (Stony Brook University) 1977–1984
- Oliver L. Austin (Florida Museum of Natural History) 1968–1976
- Robert M. Mengel (University of Kansas) 1963–1967
- Donald S. Farner (American Museum of Natural History) 1959–1962
- Eugene Eisenmann (American Museum of Natural History) 1957–1959
- Robert W. Storer (University of Michigan) 1953–1957
- Harvey I. Fisher (University of Illinois) 1948–1952
- John T. Zimmer (American Museum of Natural History) 1942–1947
- Glover M. Allen (Museum of Comparative Zoology, Harvard University) 1937–1942
- Witmer Stone (Academy of Natural Sciences of Drexel University) 1912–1936
- Joel Asaph Allen (American Museum of Natural History) 1884–1911

== See also ==
- List of ornithology journals
