= List of birds of Pernambuco =

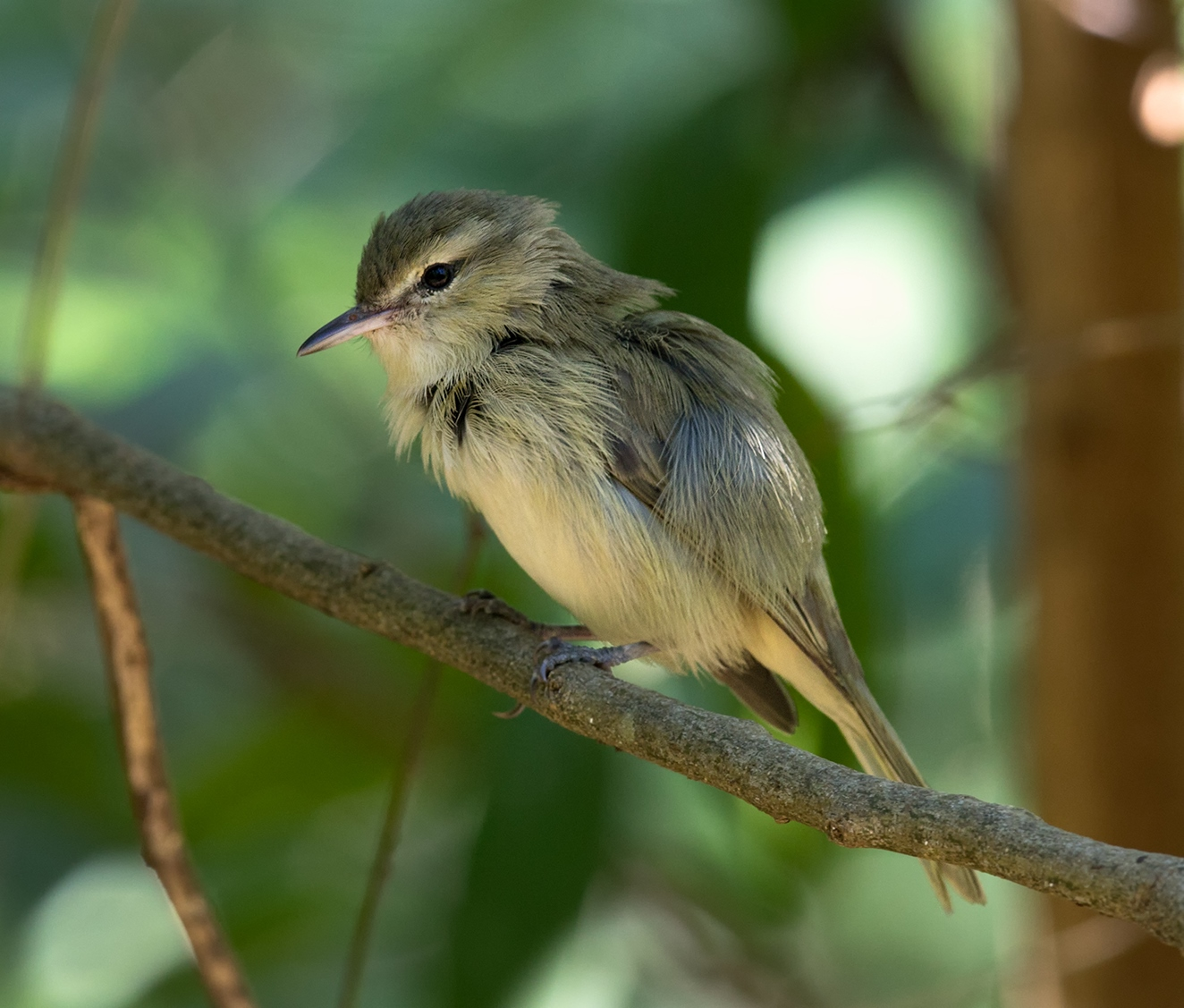
The Noronha vireo is endemic to the Fernando de Noronha archipelago in Pernambuco

This list of birds of Pernambuco includes species documented in the Brazilian state of Pernambuco. The backbone of this list is provided by Avibase, and all additions that differ from this list have citations. As of September 2025, there are 730 recorded bird species in Pernambuco.

The following tags note species in each of those categories:

- (A) Accidental - species not regularly occurring in Pernambuco
- (EB) Endemic to Brazil - species that is only found in Brazil
- (EP) Endemic to Pernambuco - species that is only found in Pernambuco
- (NO) Fernando de Noronha only - species that are only found in Pernambuco in the Fernando de Noronha archipelago
- (Ex) Extirpated - species that no longer occurs in Pernambuco but still occurs elsewhere
- (EW) Extinct in the wild - species that no longer occurs in the wild
- (X) Extinct - species no longer found anywhere in the world
- (I) Introduced - species that is not native to Pernambuco

== Rheas ==
Order: Rheiformes Family: Rheidae

- Greater rhea (Rhea americana)

== Tinamous ==
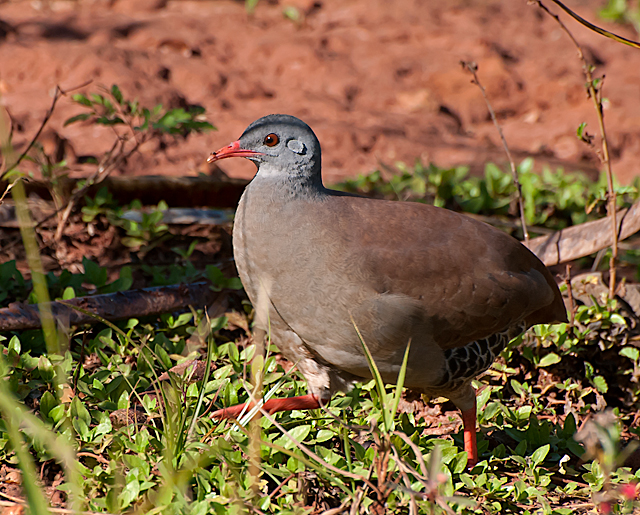
Small-billed tinamou

Order: Tinamiformes Family: Tinamidae

- Solitary tinamou (Tinamus solitarius)
- Little tinamou (Crypturellus soui)
- Brazilian tinamou (Crypturellus strigulosus)
- Yellow-legged tinamou (Crypturellus noctivagus) (EB)
- Small-billed tinamou (Crypturellus parvirostris)
- Tataupa tinamou (Crypturellus tataupa)
- Red-winged tinamou (Rhynchotus rufescens)
- White-bellied nothura (Nothura boraquira)
- Spotted nothura (Nothura maculosa)

== Screamers ==
Order: Anseriformes Family: Anhimidae

- Horned screamer (Anhima cornuta)

== Ducks, geese, and waterfowl ==
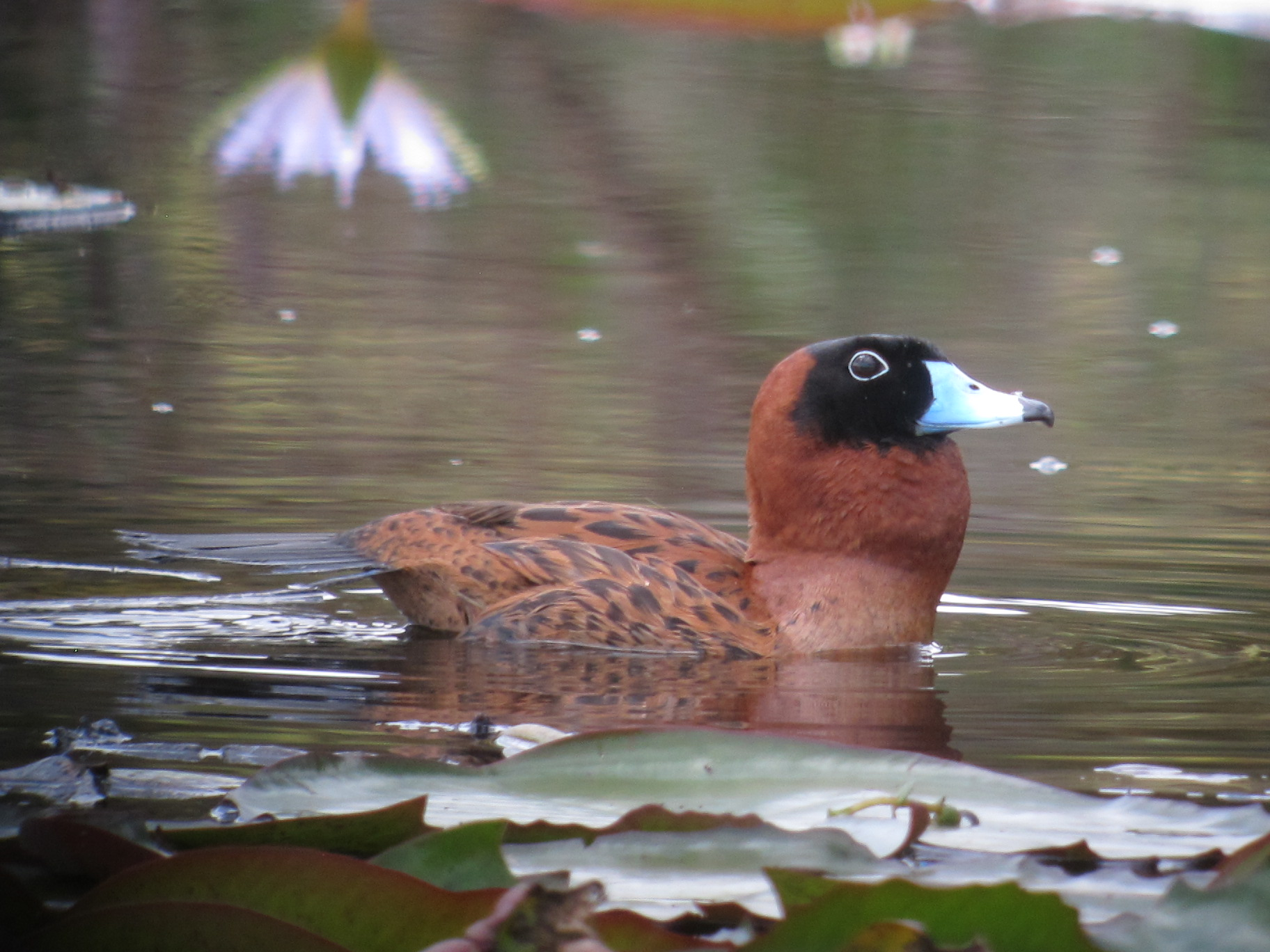
Masked duck

Order: Anseriformes Family: Anatidae

- Fulvous whistling-duck (Dendrocygna bicolor)
- White-faced whistling-duck (Dendrocygna viduata)
- Black-bellied whistling-duck (Dendrocygna autumnalis)
- Comb duck (Sarkidiornis sylvicola)
- Muscovy duck (Cairina moschata)
- Ringed teal (Callonetta leucophrys)
- Brazilian teal (Amazonetta brasiliensis)
- Blue-winged teal (Spatula discors) (A)
- Northern pintail (Anas acuta) (NO)
- White-cheeked pintail (Anas bahamensis)
- Southern pochard (Netta erythrophthalma)
- Masked duck (Nomonyx dominicus)

== Chachalacas, guans, and curassows ==
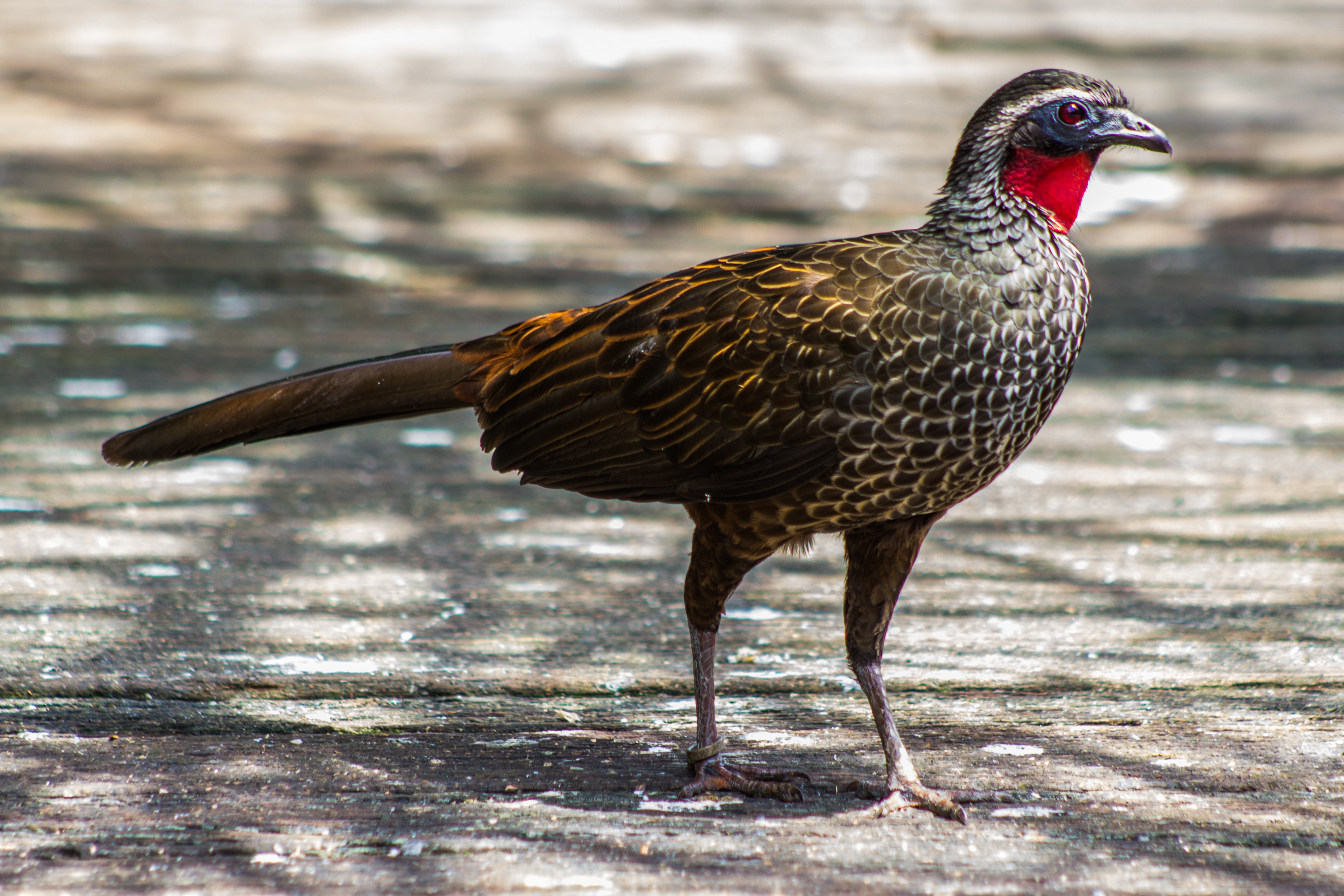
Rusty-margined guan

Order: Galliformes Family: Cracidae

- East Brazilian chachalaca (Ortalis araucuan) (EB)
- Rusty-margined guan (Penelope superciliaris)
- White-browed guan (Penelope jacucaca) (EB)
- Alagoas curassow (Mitu mitu) (EB)(EW)

== New World quail ==
Order: Galliformes Family: Odontophoridae

- Spot-winged wood quail (Odontophorus capueira)

== Doves and pigeons ==
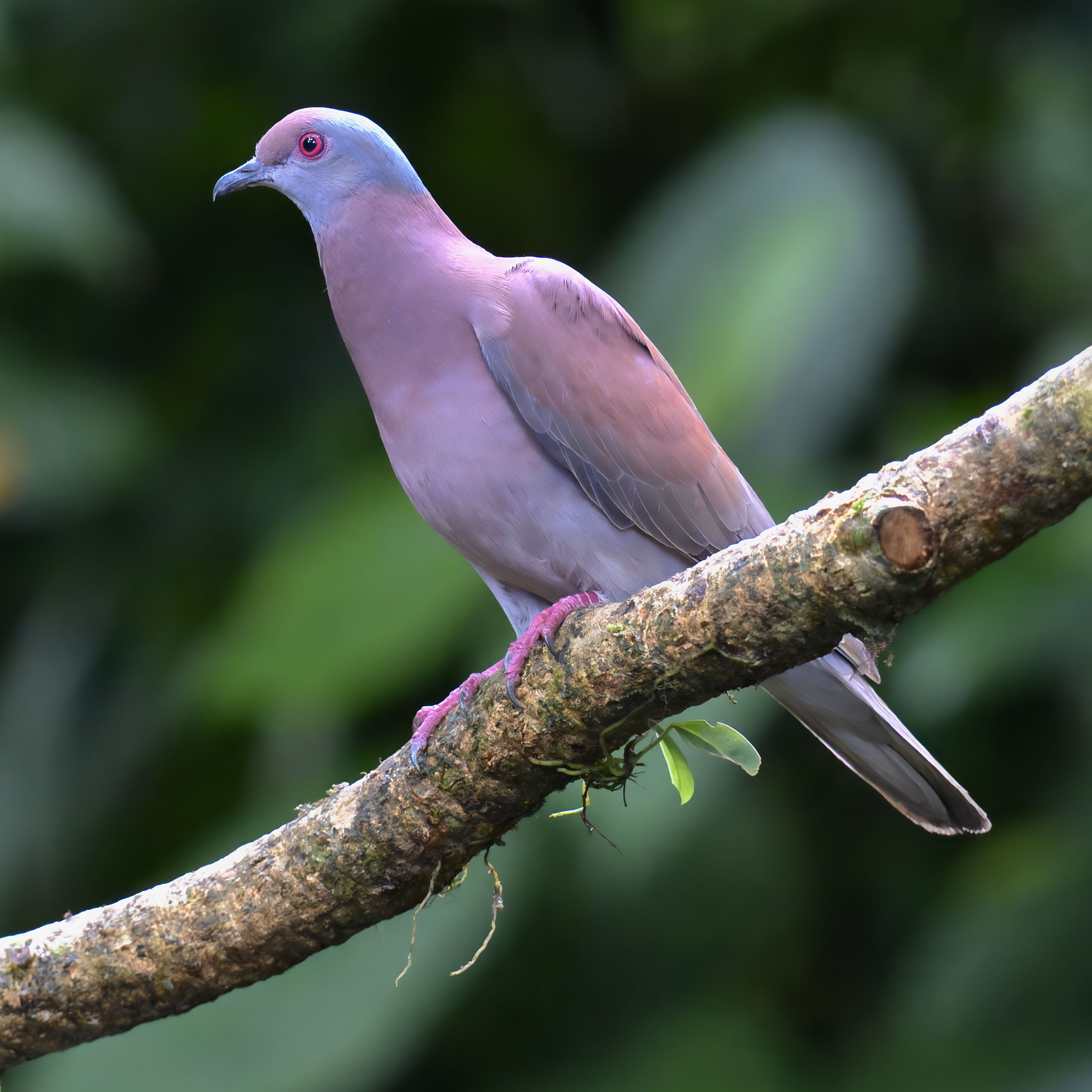
Pale-vented pigeon

Order: Columbiformes Family: Columbidae

- Rock dove (Columba livia) (I)
- Pale-vented pigeon (Patagioenas cayennensis)
- Scaled pigeon (Patagioenas speciosa)
- Picazuro pigeon (Patagioenas picazuro)
- Common ground dove (Columbina passerina)
- Plain-breasted ground dove (Columbina minuta)
- Ruddy ground dove (Columbina talpacoti)
- Scaled dove (Columbina squammata)
- Picui ground dove (Columbina picui)
- Blue ground dove (Claravis pretiosa)
- Ruddy quail-dove (Geotrygon montana)
- White-tipped dove (Leptotila verreauxi)
- Grey-fronted dove (Leptotila rufaxilla)
- Eared dove (Zenaida auriculata)

== Cuckoos ==
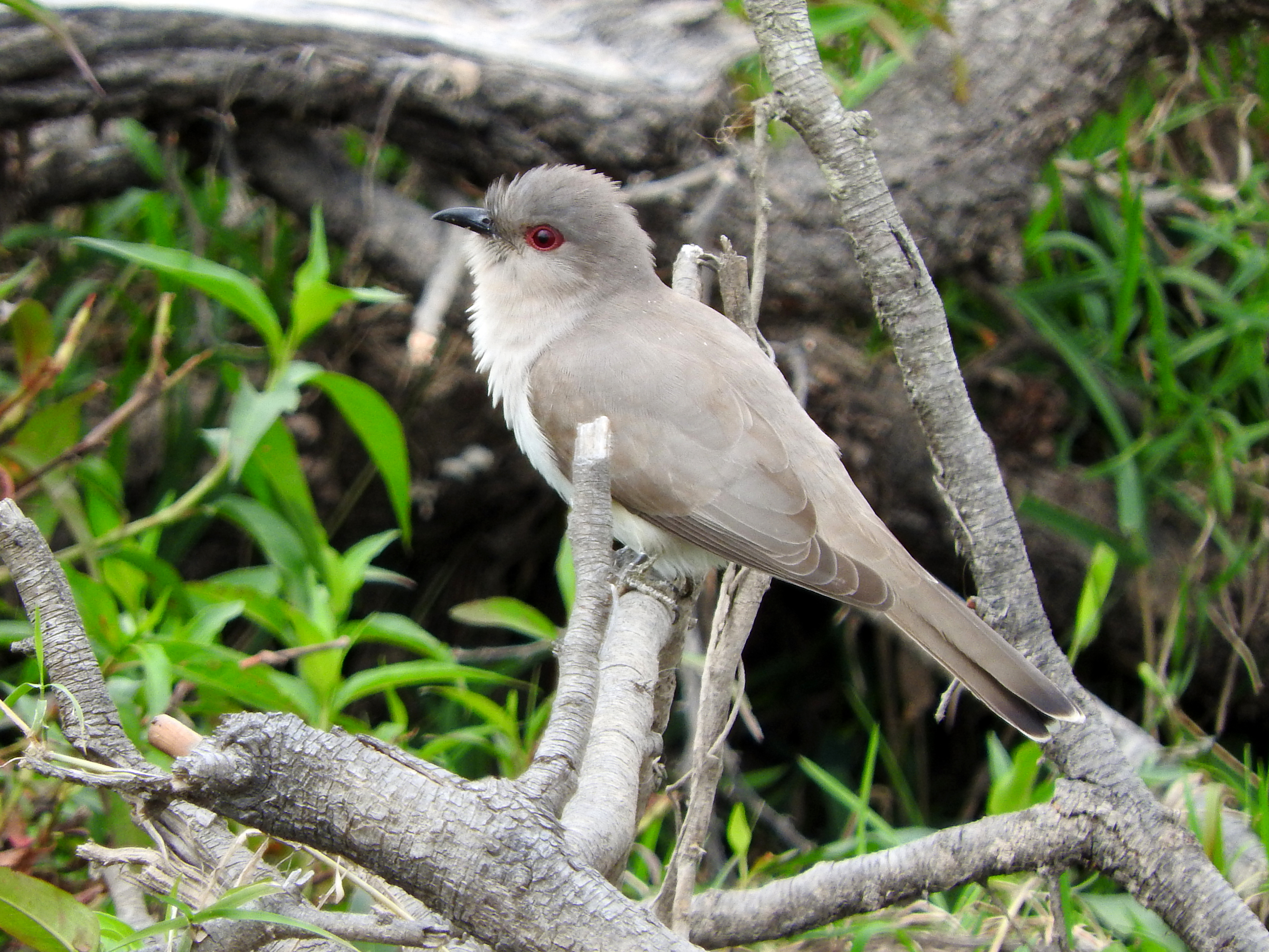
Ash-coloured cuckoo

Order: Cuculiformes Family: Cuculidae

- Guira cuckoo (Guira guira)
- Greater ani (Crotophaga major)
- Smooth-billed ani (Crotophaga ani)
- Striped cuckoo (Tapera naevia)
- Pheasant cuckoo (Dromococcyx phasianellus)
- Squirrel cuckoo (Piaya cayana)
- Ash-coloured cuckoo (Coccycua cinerea)
- Dark-billed cuckoo (Coccyzus melacoryphus)
- Yellow-billed cuckoo (Coccyzus americanus)
- Pearly-breasted cuckoo (Coccyzus euleri)
- Common cuckoo (Cuculus canorus) (A)

== Nightjars ==
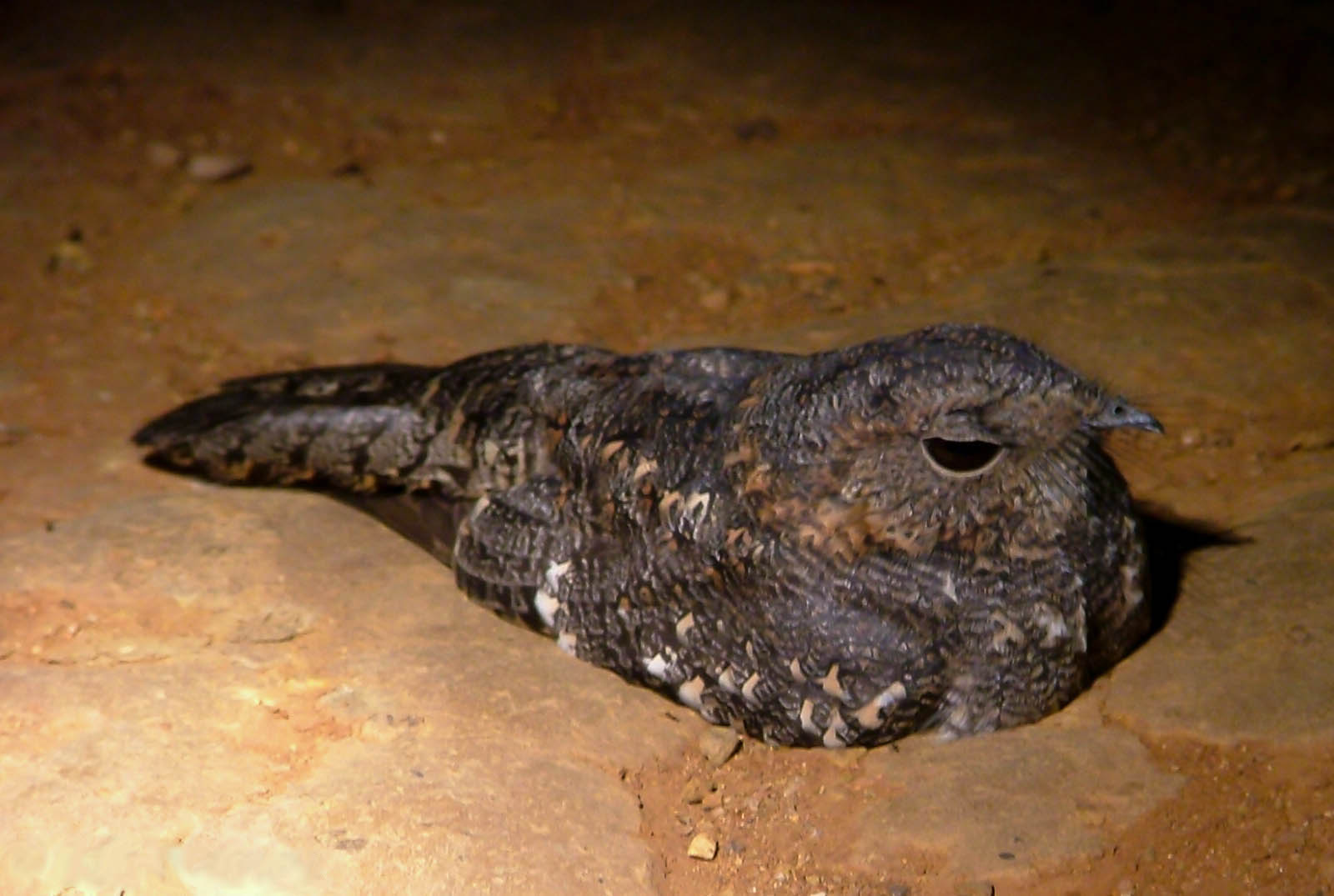
Band-winged nightjar

Order: Caprimulgiformes Family: Caprimulgidae

- Nacunda nighthawk (Chordeiles nacunda)
- Least nighthawk (Chordeiles pusillus)
- Lesser nighthawk (Chordeiles acutipennis)
- Common nighthawk (Chordeiles minor)
- Short-tailed nighthawk (Lurocalis semitorquatus)
- Pygmy nightjar (Nyctipolus hirundinaceus) (EB)
- Common pauraque (Nyctidromus albicollis)
- Little nightjar (Setopagis parvula)
- Band-winged nightjar (Systellura longirostris)
- Scissor-tailed nightjar (Hydropsalis torquata)
- Ocellated poorwill (Nyctiphrynus ocellatus)
- Rufous nightjar (Antrostomus rufus)

== Potoos ==
Order: Nyctibiiformes Family: Nyctibiidae

- Common potoo (Nyctibius griseus)

== Swifts ==
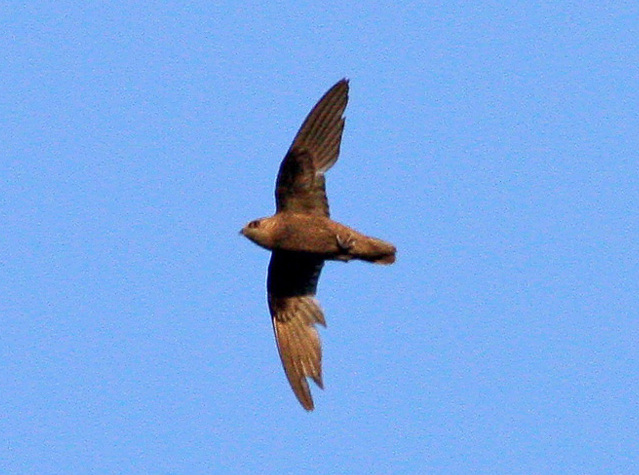
Great dusky swift

Order: Apodiformes Family: Apodidae

- Great dusky swift (Cypseloides senex)
- Biscutate swift (Streptoprocne biscutata)
- Band-rumped swift (Chaetura spinicaudus)
- Sick's swift (Chaetura meridionalis)
- Lesser swallow-tailed swift (Panyptila cayennensis)
- Fork-tailed palm-swift (Tachornis squamata)

== Hummingbirds ==
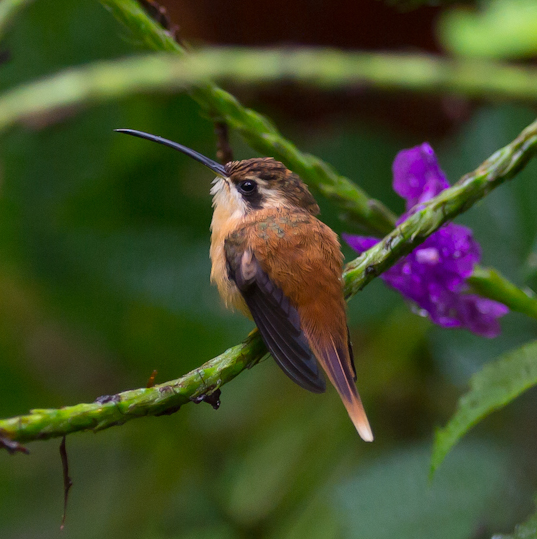
Reddish hermit

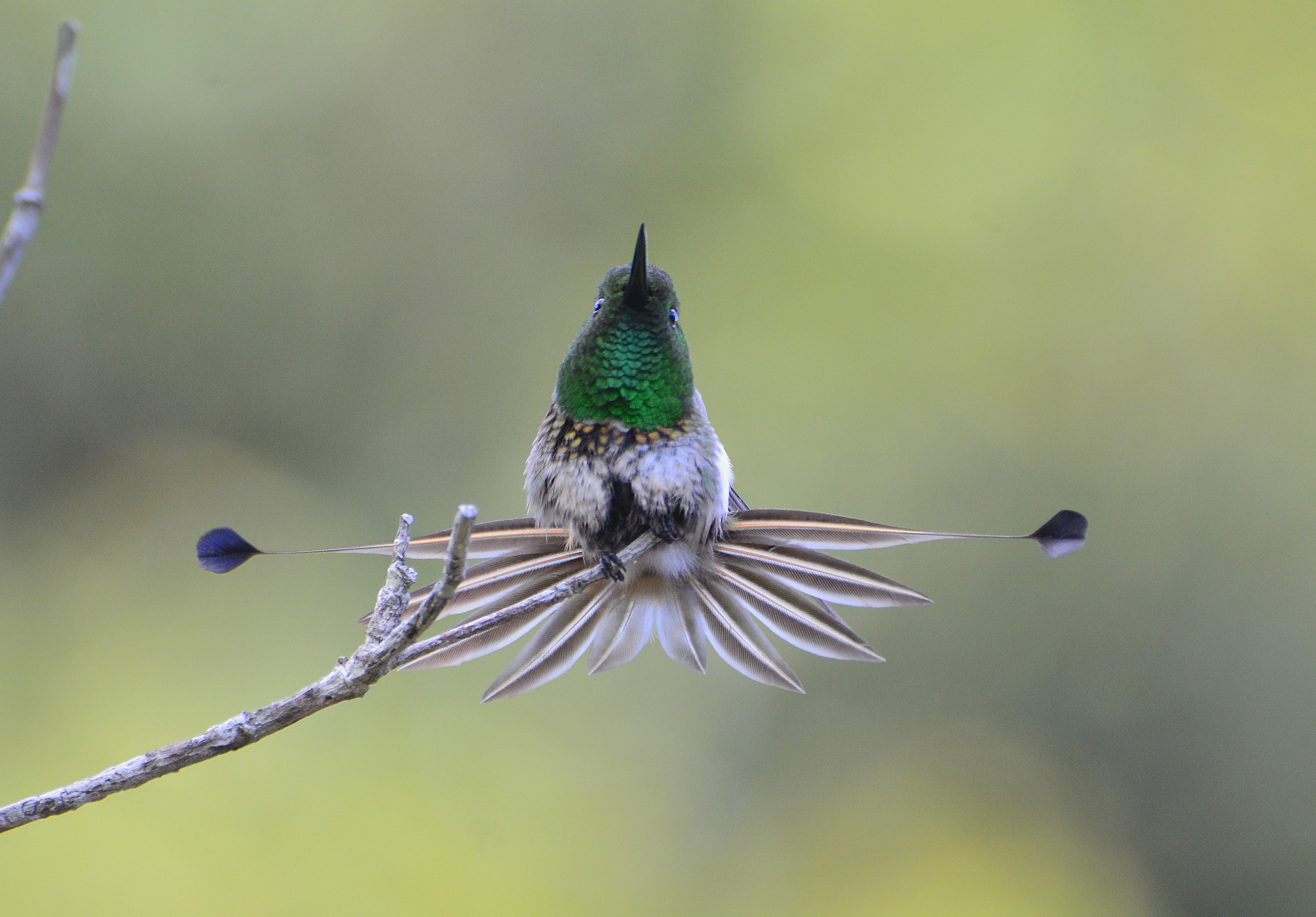
Racket-tipped thorntail

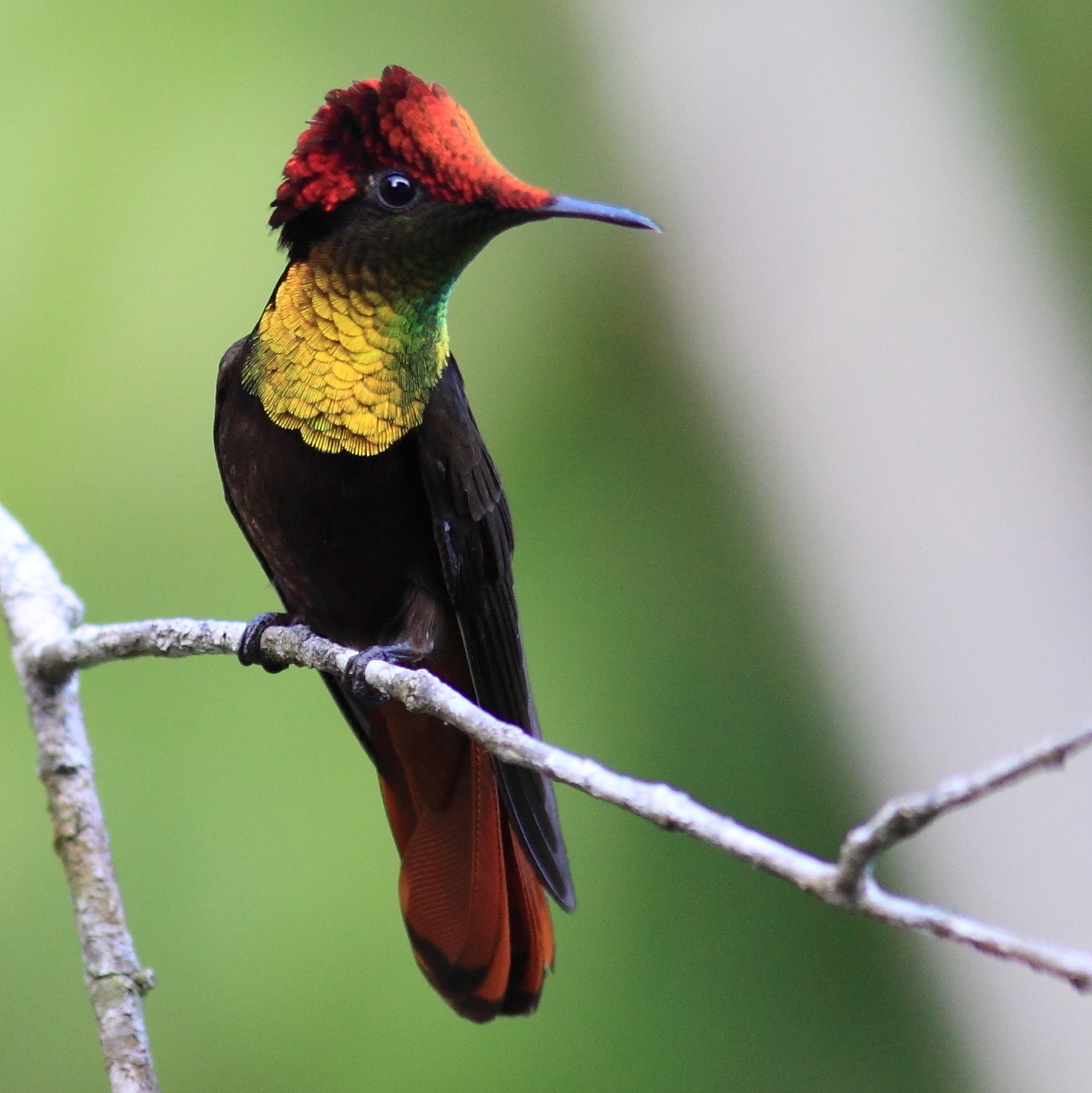
Ruby-topaz hummingbird

Order: Apodiformes Family: Trochilidae

- Black jacobin (Florisuga fusca)
- Rufous-breasted hermit (Glaucis hirsutus)
- Broad-tipped hermit (Anopetia gounellei) (EB)
- Reddish hermit (Phaethornis ruber)
- Planalto hermit (Phaethornis pretrei)
- Great-billed hermit (Phaethornis malaris)
- White-vented violetear (Colibri serrirostris)
- Horned sungem (Heliactin bilophus)
- Black-eared fairy (Heliothryx auritus)
- White-tailed goldenthroat (Polytmus guainumbi)
- Ruby-topaz hummingbird (Chrysolampis mosquitus)
- Black-throated mango (Anthracothorax nigricollis)
- Racket-tipped thorntail (Discosura longicaudus)
- Frilled coquette (Lophornis magnificus) (EB)
- Stripe-breasted starthroat (Heliomaster squamosus) (EB)
- Amethyst woodstar (Calliphlox amethystina)
- Glittering-bellied emerald (Chlorostilbon lucidus)
- Long-tailed woodnymph (Thalurania watertonii) (EB)
- Fork-tailed woodnymph (Thalurania furcata)
- Swallow-tailed hummingbird (Eupetomena macroura)
- Sombre hummingbird (Eupetomena cirrochloris)
- Versicolored emerald (Chrysuronia versicolor)
- Plain-bellied emerald (Chrysuronia leucogaster)
- Glittering-throated emerald (Chionomesa fimbriata)
- Rufous-throated sapphire (Hylocharis sapphirina)
- White-chinned sapphire (Chlorestes cyanus)
- Blue-chinned sapphire (Chlorestes notata)

== Rails ==
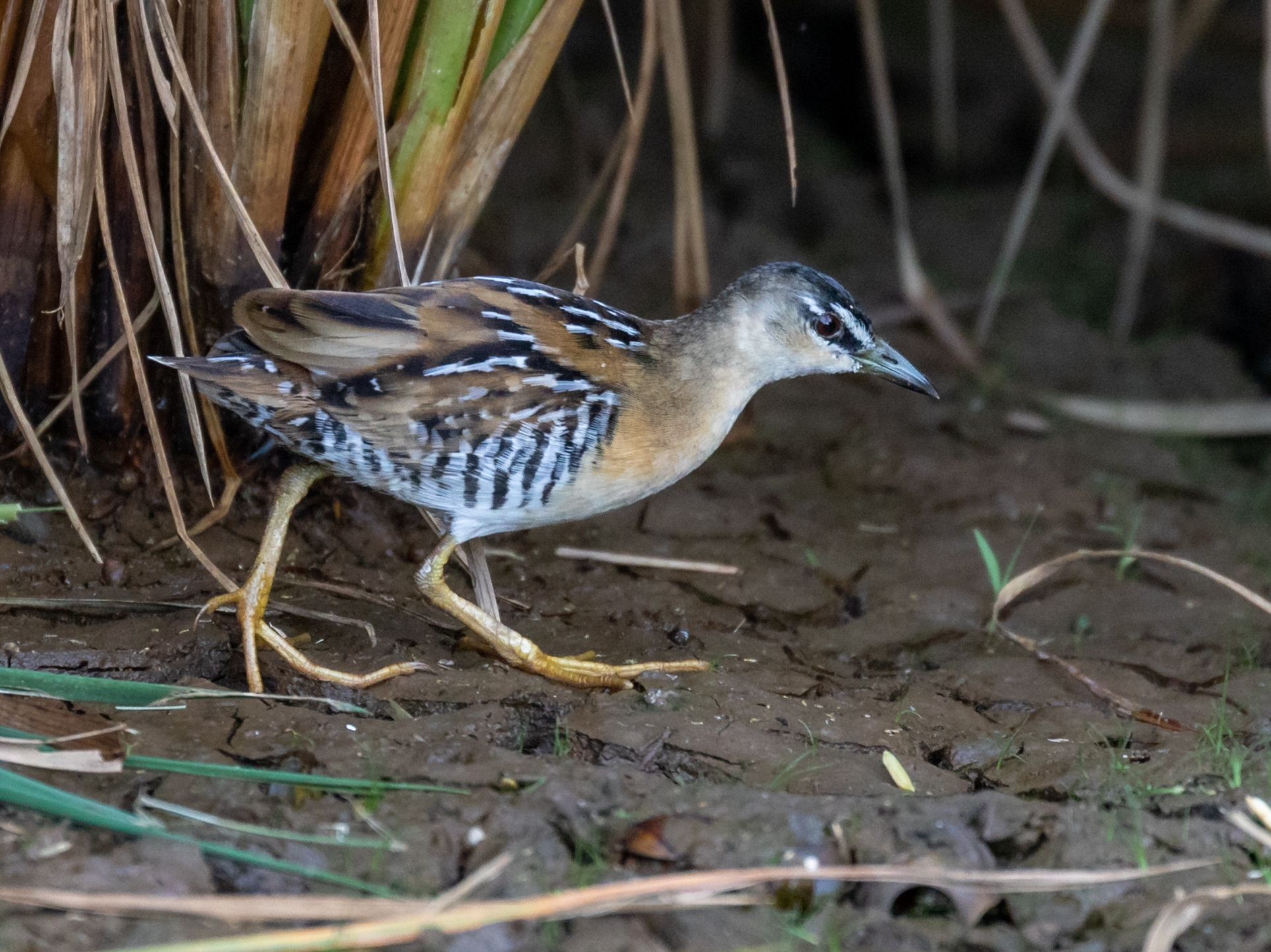
Yellow-breasted crake

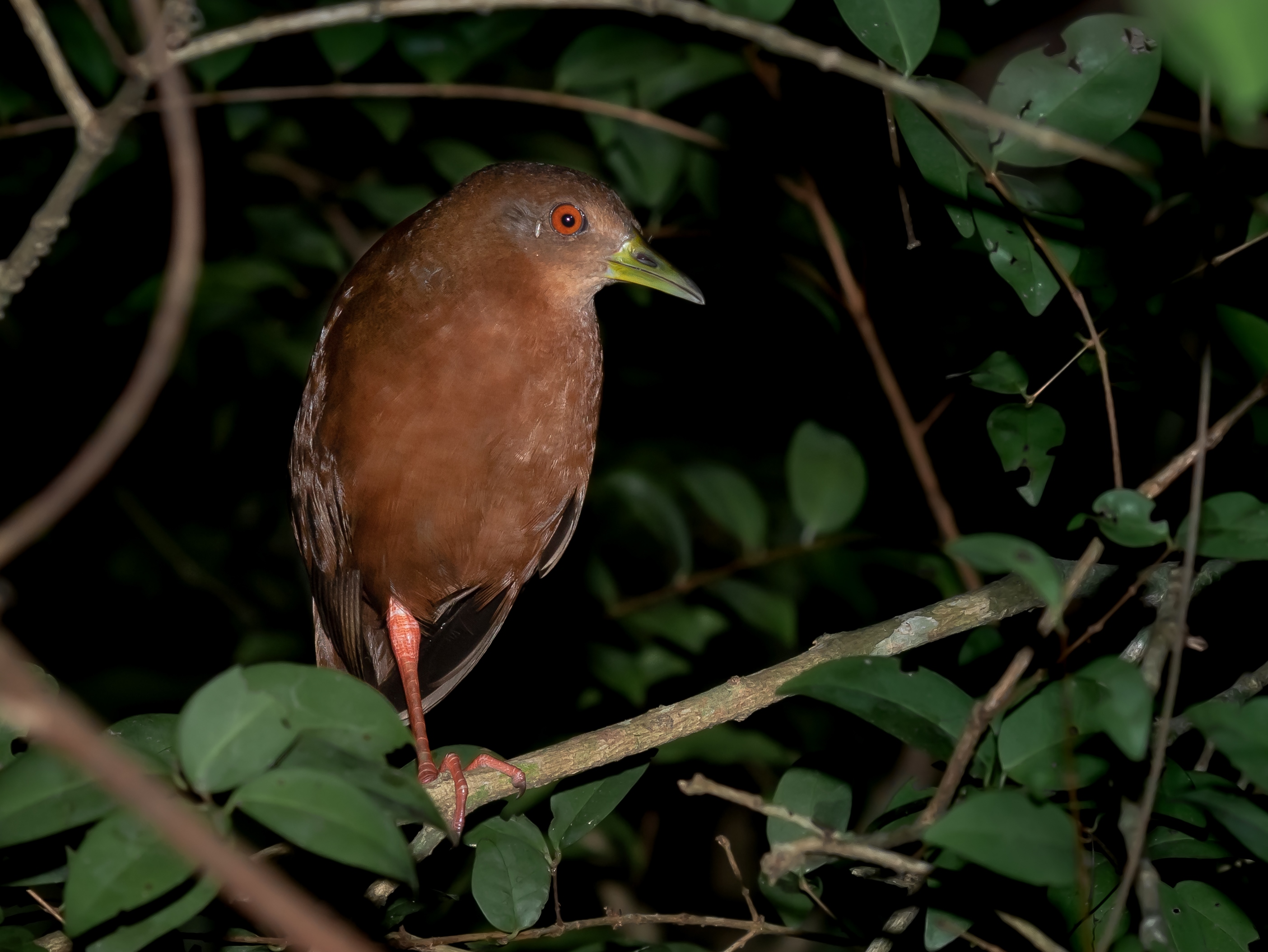
Uniform crake

Order: Gruiformes Family: Rallidae

- Corn crake (Crex crex) (A)
- Mangrove rail (Rallus longirostris)
- Purple gallinule (Porphyrio martinica)
- Allen's gallinule (Porphyrio alleni) (A)
- Russet-crowned crake (Rufirallus viridis)
- Yellow-breasted crake (Laterallus flavienter)
- Rufous-sided crake (Laterallus melanophaius)
- Grey-breasted crake (Laterallus exilis)
- Ash-throated crake (Mustelirallus albicollis)
- Paint-billed crake (Mustelirallus erythrops)
- Blackish rail (Pardirallus nigricans)
- Spotted rail (Pardirallus maculatus)
- Uniform crake (Amaurolimnas concolor)
- Giant wood rail (Aramides ypecaha)
- Little wood rail (Aramids mangle) (EB)
- Grey-cowled wood rail (Aramides cajaneus)
- Spot-flanked gallinule (Porphyriops melanops)
- Lesser moorhen (Paragallinula angulata) (A)
- Common gallinule (Gallinula galeata)

== Limpkins ==
Order: Gruiformes Family: Aramidae

- Limpkin (Aramus guarauna)

== Sheathbills ==
Order: Charadriiformes Family: Chionididae

- Snowy sheathbill, Chionis alba (A)

== Stilts and avocets ==
Order: Charadriiformes Family: Recurvirostridae

- Black-necked stilt (Himantopus mexicanus)

== Oystercatchers ==
Order: Charadriiformes Family: Haematopodidae

- American oystercatcher (Haematopus palliatus)

== Plovers and Lapwings ==
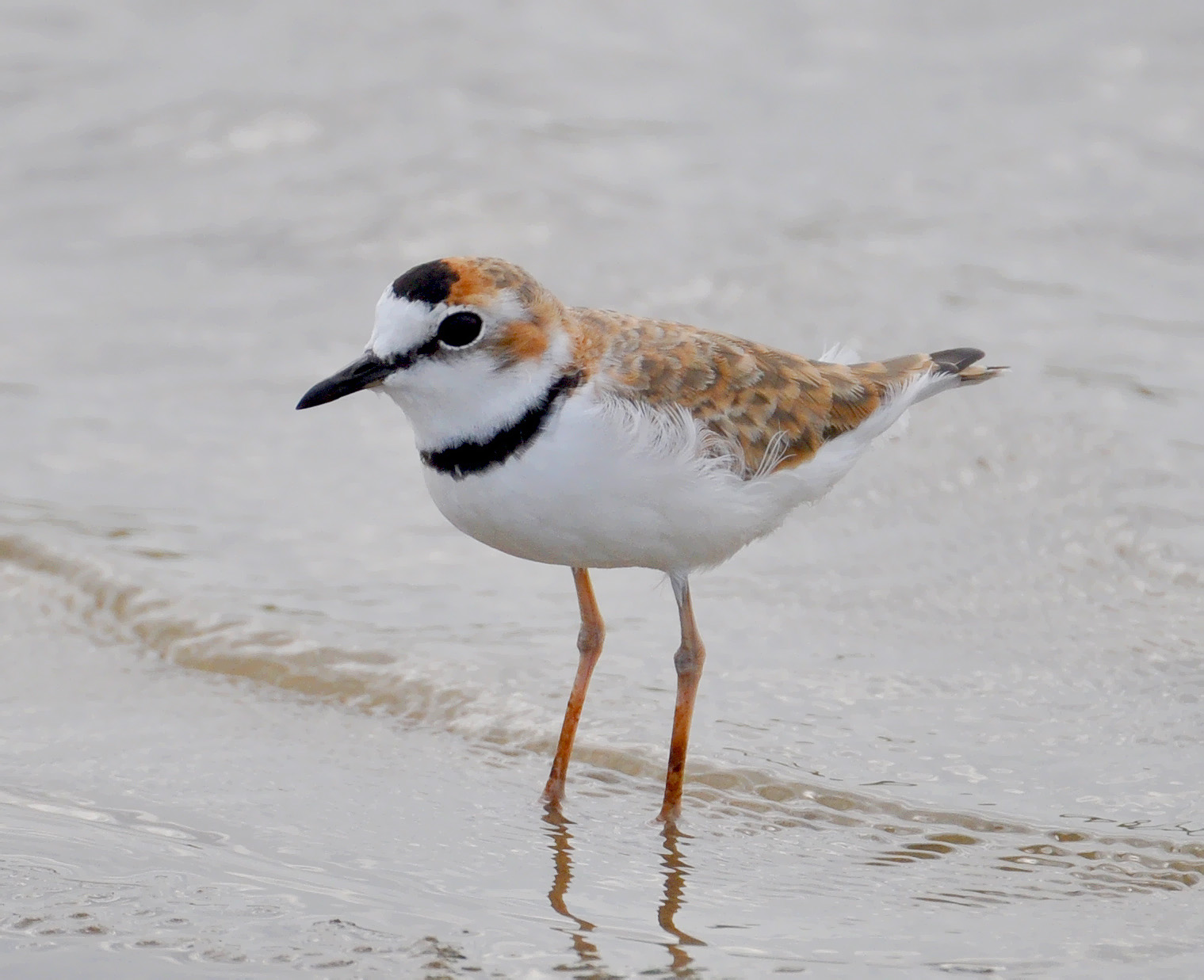
Collared plover

Order: Charadriiformes Family: Charadriidae

- Black-bellied plover (Pluvialis squatarola)
- American golden plover (Pluvialis dominica)
- Pied plover (Hoploxypterus cayanus)
- Semipalmated plover (Charadrius semipalmatus)
- Southern lapwing (Vanellus chilensis)
- Wilson's plover (Anarhynchus wilsonia)
- Collared plover (Anarhynchus collaris)

== Jacanas ==
Order: Charadriiformes Family: Jacanidae

- Wattled jacana (Jacana jacana)

== Sandpipers ==
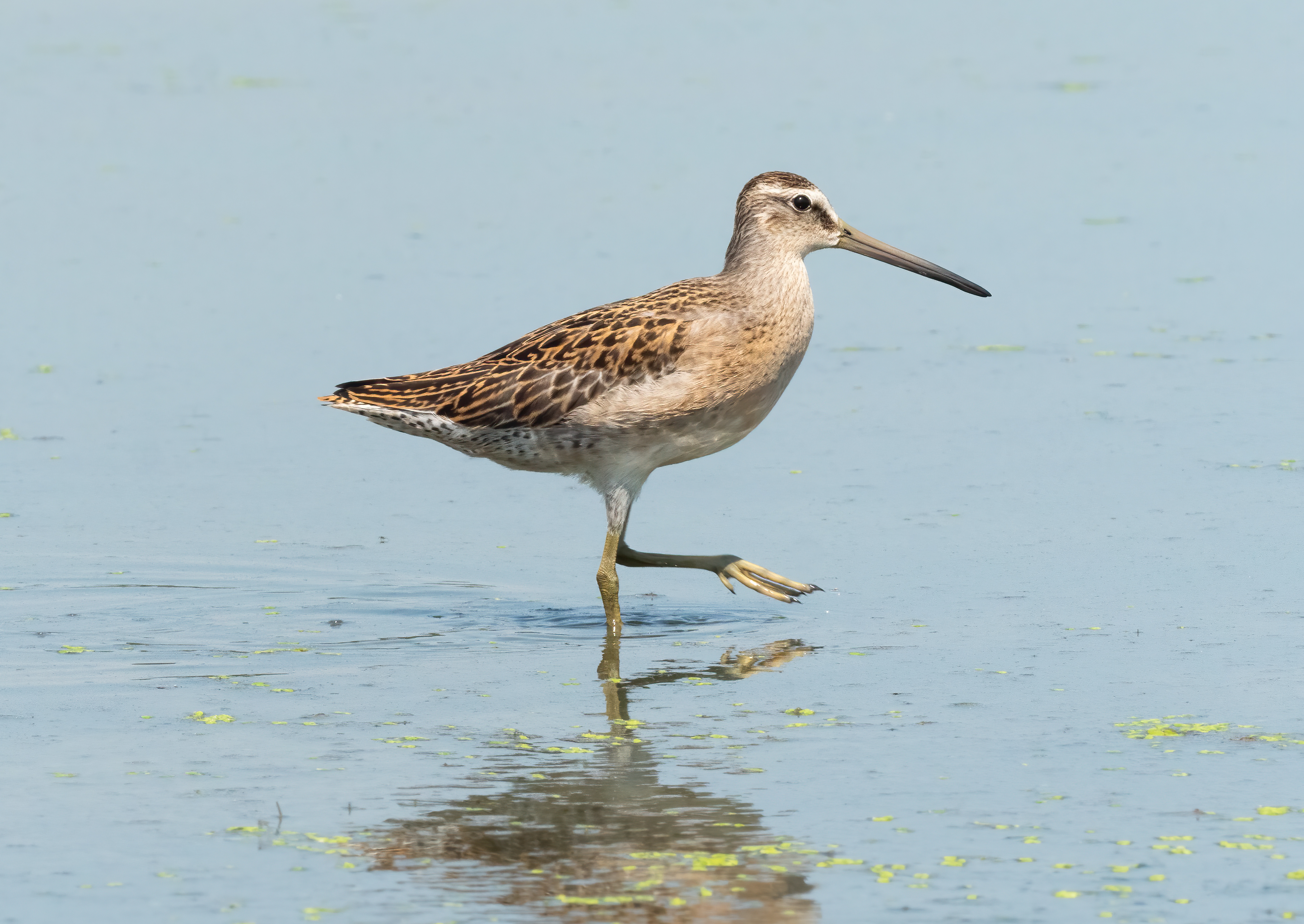
Short-billed dowitcher

Order: Charadriiformes Family: Scolopacidae

- Hudsonian whimbrel (Numenius hudsonicus)
- Eurasian whimbrel (Numenius phaeopus) (NO)
- Bar-tailed godwit (Limosa lapponica) (NO)
- Short-billed dowitcher (Limnodromus griseus)
- South American snipe (Gallinago paraguaiae)
- Wilson's phalarope (Phalaropus tricolor)
- Spotted sandpiper (Actitis macularius)
- Solitary sandpiper (Tringa solitaria)
- Wood sandpiper (Tringa glareola) (A)
- Lesser yellowlegs (Tringa flavipes)
- Willet (Tringa semipalmata)
- Greater yellowlegs (Tringa melanoleuca)
- Ruddy turnstone (Arenaria interpres)
- Red knot (Calidris canutus)
- Ruff (Calidris pugnax) (A)
- Stilt sandpiper (Calidris himantopus)
- Sanderling (Calidris alba)
- Little stint (Calidris minuta) (A)
- White-rumped sandpiper (Calidris fuscicollis)
- Pectoral sandpiper (Calidris melanotos)
- Least sandpiper (Calidris minutilla)
- Western sandpiper (Calidris mauri) (A)
- Semipalmated sandpiper (Calidris pusilla)

== Skuas and jaegers ==
Order: Charadriiformes Family: Stercorariidae

- South polar skua (Stercorarius maccormicki)
- Great skua (Stercorarius skua) (A)

== Gulls, terns, and skimmers ==
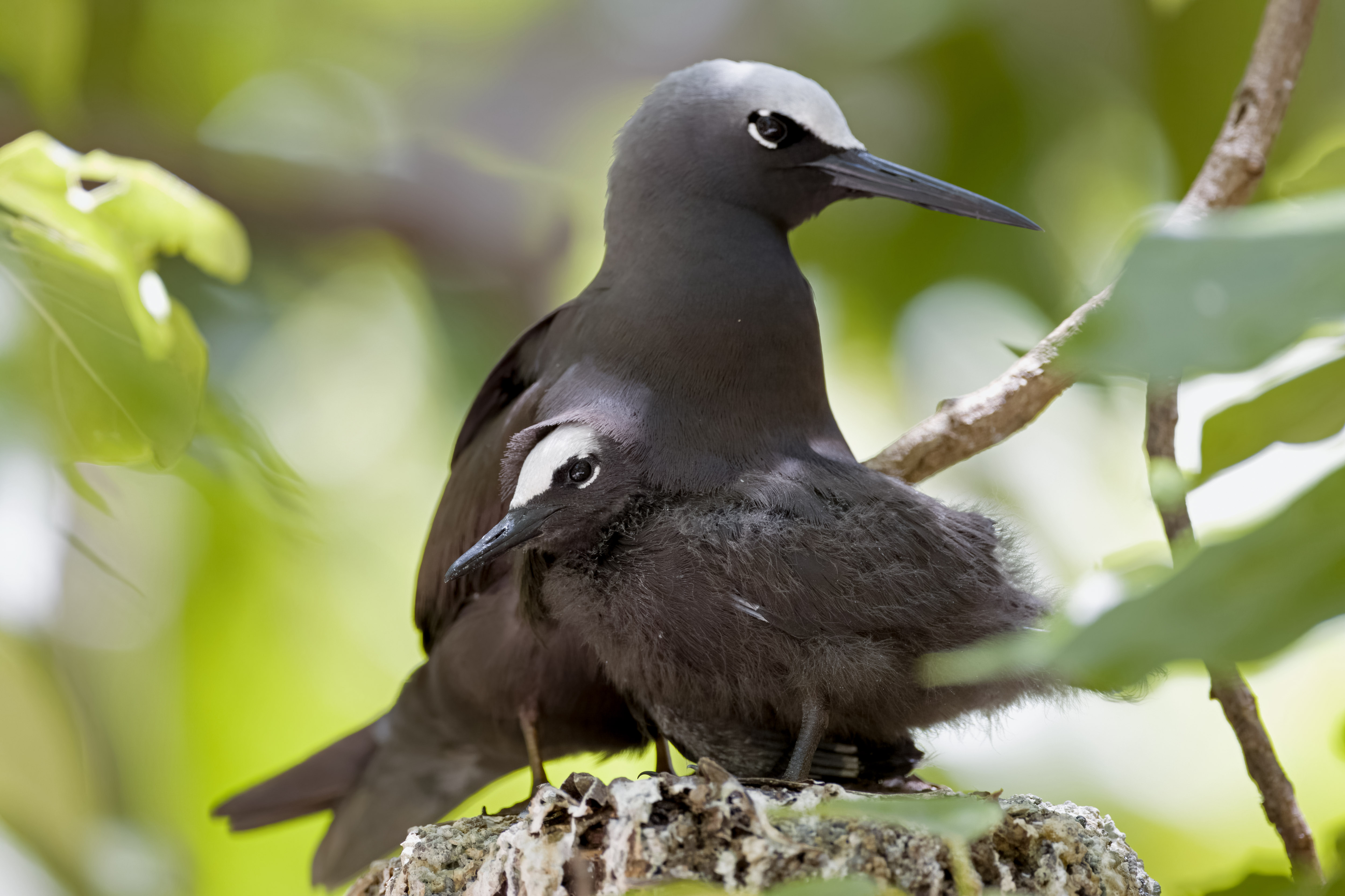
Black noddy

Order: Charadriiformes Family: Laridae

- Grey-hooded gull (Chroicocephalus cirrocephalus)
- Laughing gull (Leucophaeus atricilla) (A)
- Franklin's gull (Leucophaeus pipixcan) (A)
- Kelp gull (Larus dominicanus)
- Black skimmer (Rynchops niger)
- White tern (Gygis alba)
- Brown noddy (Anous stolidus)
- Black noddy (Anous minutus)
- Sooty tern (Onychoprion fuscatus)
- Yellow-billed tern (Sternula superciliaris)
- Large-billed tern (Phaetusa simplex)
- Gull-billed tern (Gelochelidon nilotica)
- Black tern (Chlidonias niger) (A)
- Arctic tern (Sterna paradisaea)
- Common tern (Sterna hirundo)
- Roseate tern (Sterna dougallii)
- Royal tern (Thalasseus maximus)
- Sandwich tern (Thalasseus sandvicensis) (A)

== Grebes ==
Order: Podicipediformes Family: Podicipedidae

- Pied-billed grebe (Podilymbus podiceps)
- Least grebe (Tachybaptus dominicus)

== Tropicbirds ==
Order: Phaethontiformes Family: Phaethontidae

- White-tailed tropicbird (Phaethon lepturus)
- Red-billed tropicbird (Phaethon aethereus)
- Red-tailed tropicbird (Phaethon rubricauda) (A)

== Penguins ==
Order: Sphenisciformes Family: Spheniscidae

- Magellanic penguin (Spheniscus magellanicus) (A)

== Albatrosses ==
Order: Procellariiformes Family: Diomedeidae

- Atlantic yellow-nosed albatross (Thalassarche chlororhynchos)

== Southern storm petrels ==
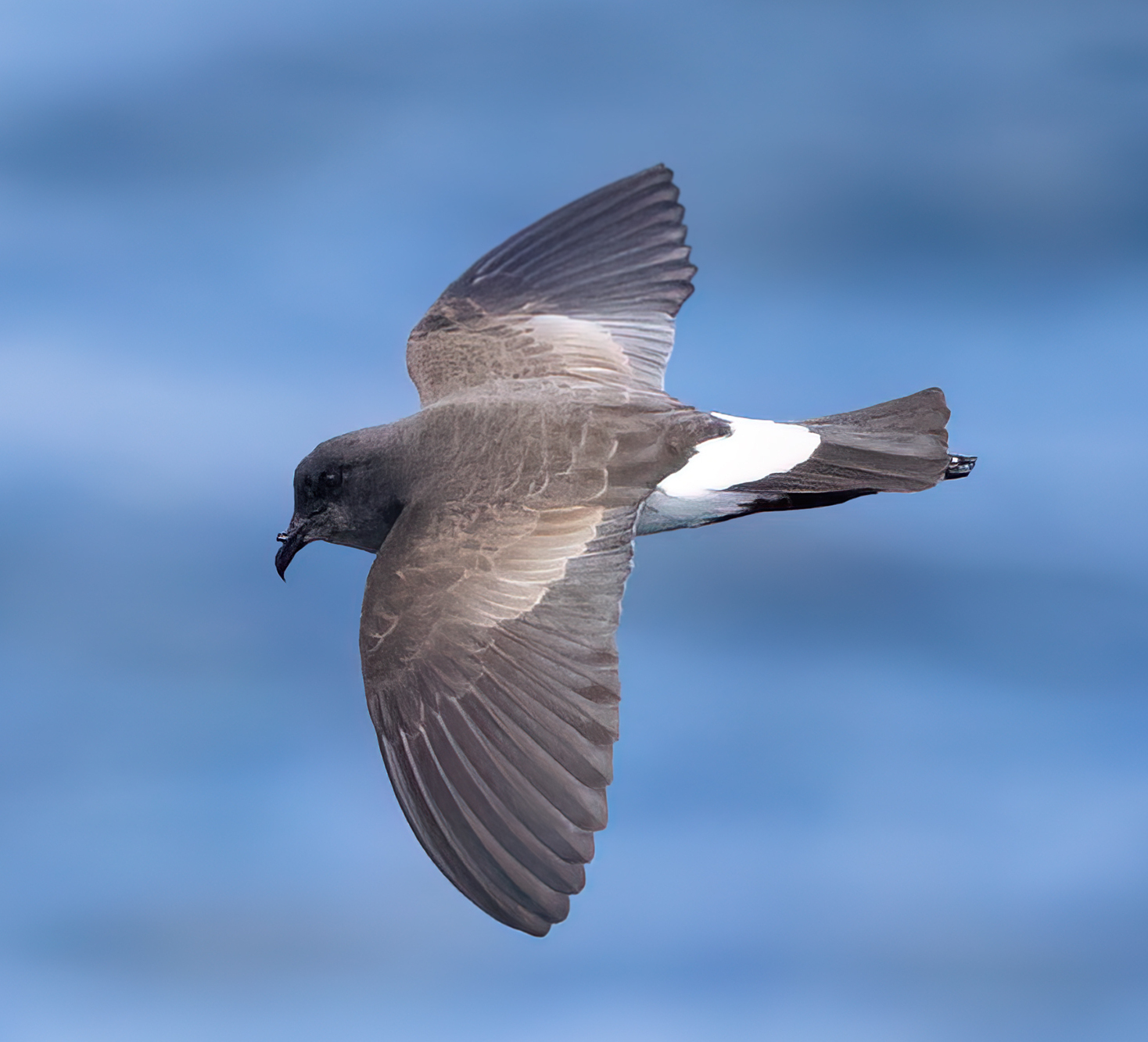
Black-bellied storm-petrel

Order: Procellariiformes Family: Oceanitidae

- Wilson's storm-petrel (Oceanites oceanicus)
- Black-bellied storm-petrel (Fregetta tropica) (NO)

== Northern storm petrels ==
Order: Procellariiformes Family: Hydrobatidae

- Leach's storm-petrel (Hydrobates leucorhous)

== Petrels and shearwaters ==
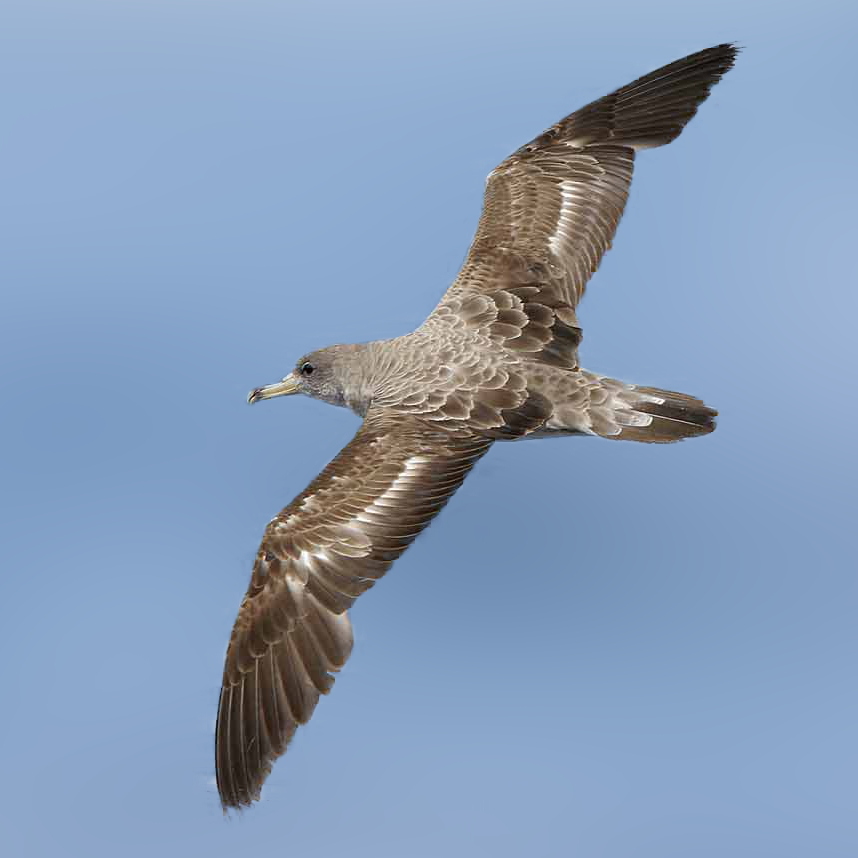
Cory's shearwater

Order: Procellariiformes Family: Procellariidae

- Great-winged petrel (Pterodroma macroptera) (A)
- Trindade petrel (Pterodroma arminjoniana)
- Bulwer's petrel (Bulweria bulwerii)
- Cory's shearwater (Calonectris diomedea)
- Cape Verde shearwater (Calonectris edwardsii)
- Great shearwater (Ardenna gravis)
- Sooty shearwater (Ardenna grisea)
- Manx shearwater (Puffinus puffinus)
- Sargasso shearwater (Puffinus lherminieri)

== Storks ==
Order: Pelecaniformes Family: Ciconiidae

- Wood stork (Mycteria americana)
- Maguari stork (Ciconia maguari)
- Jabiru (Jabiru mycteria)

== Frigatebirds ==
Order: Pelecaniformes Family: Fregatidae

- Ascension frigatebird (Fregata aquila) (A)
- Magnificent frigatebird (Fregata magnificens)
- Lesser frigatebird (Fregata ariel)

== Boobies and gannets ==
Order: Pelecaniformes Family: Sulidae

- Red-footed booby (Sula sula)
- Brown booby (Sula leucogaster) (NO)
- Masked booby (Sula dactylatra)

== Anhingas ==
Order: Pelecaniformes Family: Anhingidae

- Anhinga (Anhinga anhinga)

== Cormorants ==
Order: Pelecaniformes Family: Phalacrocoracidae

- Neotropic cormorant (Phalacrocorax brasilianus)
- Antarctic shag (Leucocarbo bransfieldensis) (A)

== Ibises and spoonbills ==
Order: Pelecaniformes Family: Threskiornithidae

- Bare-faced ibis (Phimosus infuscatus)
- Buff-necked ibis (Theristicus caudatus)
- Eurasian spoonbill (Platalea leucorodia) (A)

== Herons and egrets ==
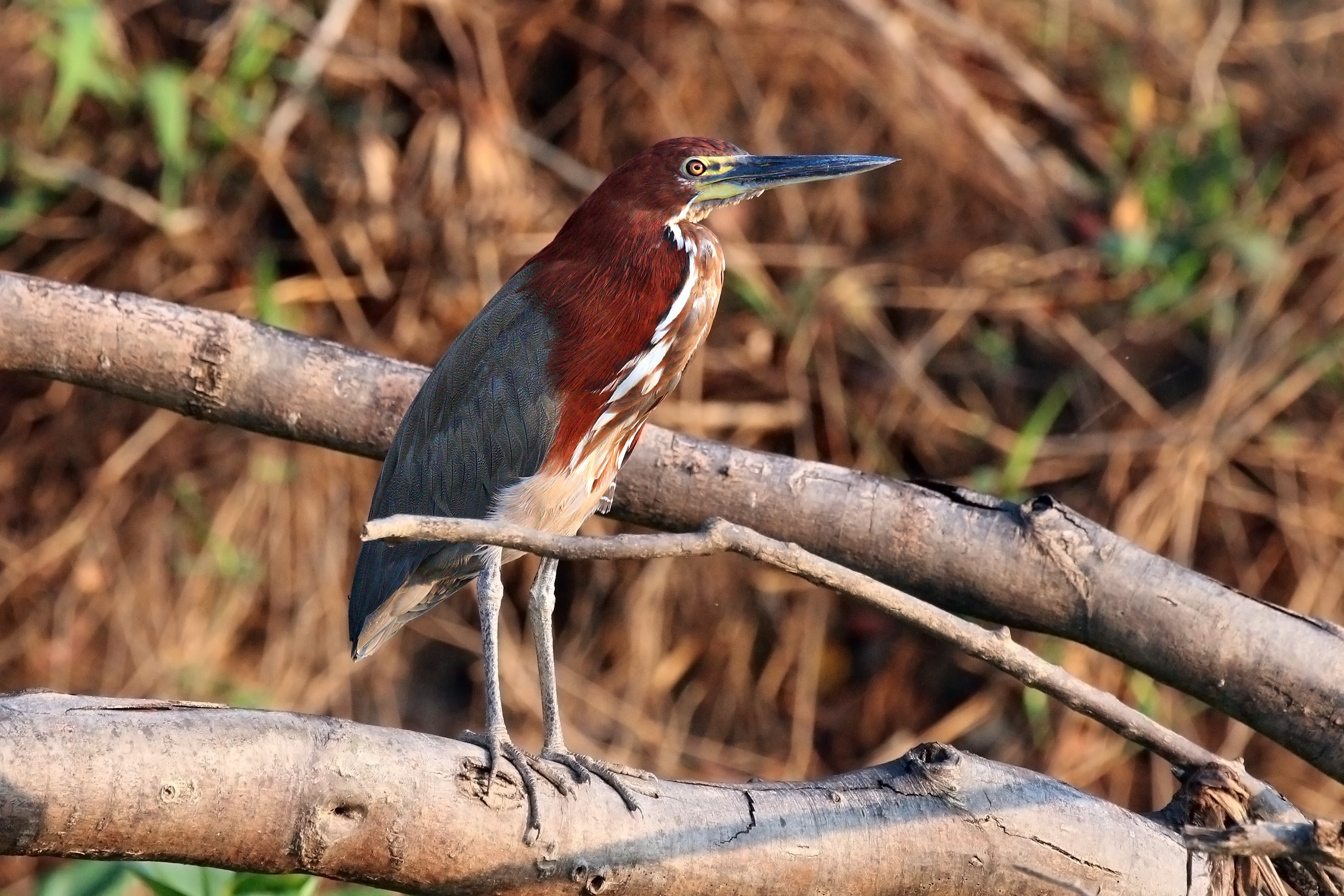
Rufescent tiger-heron

Order: Pelecaniformes Family: Ardeidae

- Rufescent tiger-heron (Tigrisoma lineatum)
- Boat-billed heron (Cochlearius cochlearius)
- Pinnated bittern (Botaurus pinnatus)
- Stripe-backed bittern (Botaurus involucris)
- Least bittern (Botaurus exilis)
- Yellow-crowned night-heron (Nyctanassa violacea)
- Black-crowned night-heron (Nycticorax nycticorax)
- Capped heron (Pilherodius pileatus)
- Whistling heron (Syrigma sibilatrix) (A)
- Little blue heron (Egretta caerulea)
- Snowy egret (Egretta thula)
- Little egret (Egretta garzetta) (A)
- Western reef-heron (Egretta gularis) (A)
- Striated heron (Butorides striata)
- Squacco heron (Ardeola ralloides) (NO)
- Western cattle egret (Ardea ibis)
- Great egret (Ardea alba)
- Grey heron (Ardea cinerea) (A)
- Cocoi heron (Ardea cocoi)
- Purple heron (Ardea purpurea) (A)

== New World vultures ==
Order: Cathartiformes Family: Cathartidae

- Turkey vulture (Cathartes aura)
- Andean condor (Vultur gryphus) (A)
- Lesser yellow-headed vulture (Cathartes burrovianus)
- Black vulture (Coragyps atratus)
- King vulture (Sarcoramphus papa)

== Ospreys ==
Order: Accipitriformes Family: Pandionidae

- Osprey (Pandion haliaetus)

== Hawks, kites, and eagles ==
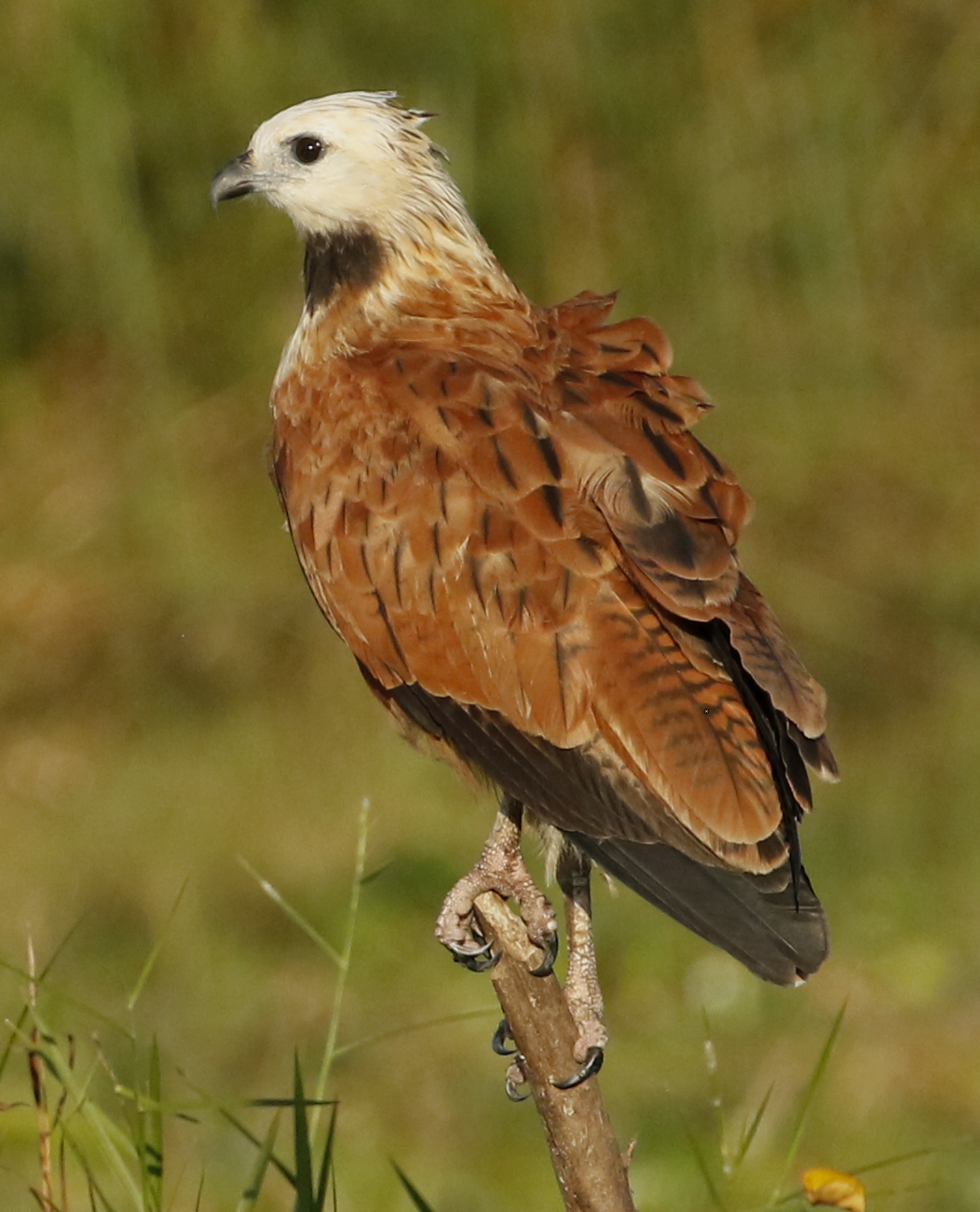
Black-collared hawk

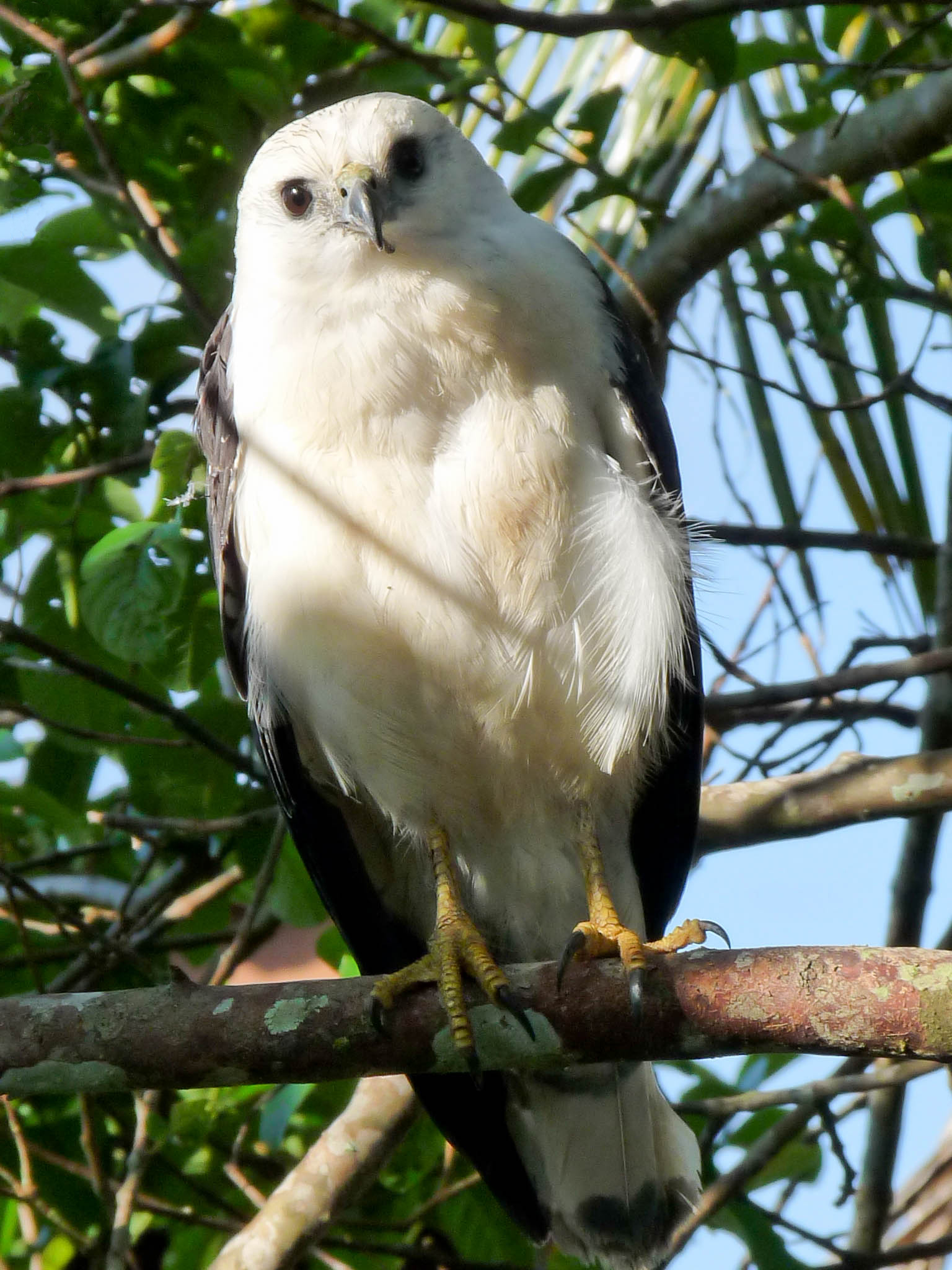
White-necked hawk

Order: Accipitriformes Family: Accipitridae

- Pearl kite (Gampsonyx swainsonii)
- White-tailed kite (Elanus leucurus)
- Hook-billed kite (Chondrohierax uncinatus)
- White-collared kite (Leptodon forbesi) (EB)
- Swallow-tailed kite (Elanoides forficatus)
- Black hawk-eagle (Spizaetus tyrannus)
- Crested eagle (Morphnus guianensis)
- Sharp-shinned hawk (Accipiter striatus)
- Bicolored hawk (Astur bicolor)
- Double-toothed kite (Harpagus bidentatus)
- Rufous-thighed kite (Harpagus diodon)
- Plumbeous kite (Ictinia plumbea)
- Crane hawk (Geranospiza caerulescens)
- Black-collared hawk (Busarellus nigricollis)
- Snail kite (Rostrhamus sociabilis)
- Rufous crab hawk (Buteogallus aequinoctialis)
- Savanna hawk (Buteogallus meridionalis)
- White-necked hawk (Buteogallus lacernulatus) (EB)
- Great black hawk (Buteogallus urubitinga)
- Roadside hawk (Rupornis magnirostris)
- Harris's hawk (Parabuteo unicinctus)
- White-tailed hawk (Geranoaetus albicaudatus)
- Black-chested buzzard-eagle (Geranoaetus melanoleucus)
- Mantled hawk (Pseudastur polionotus)
- Grey-lined hawk (Buteo nitidus)
- Zone-tailed hawk (Buteo albonotatus)
- Short-tailed hawk (Buteo brachyurus)

== Barn Owls ==
Order: Strigiformes Family: Tytonidae

- American barn owl (Tyto furcata)

== Owls ==
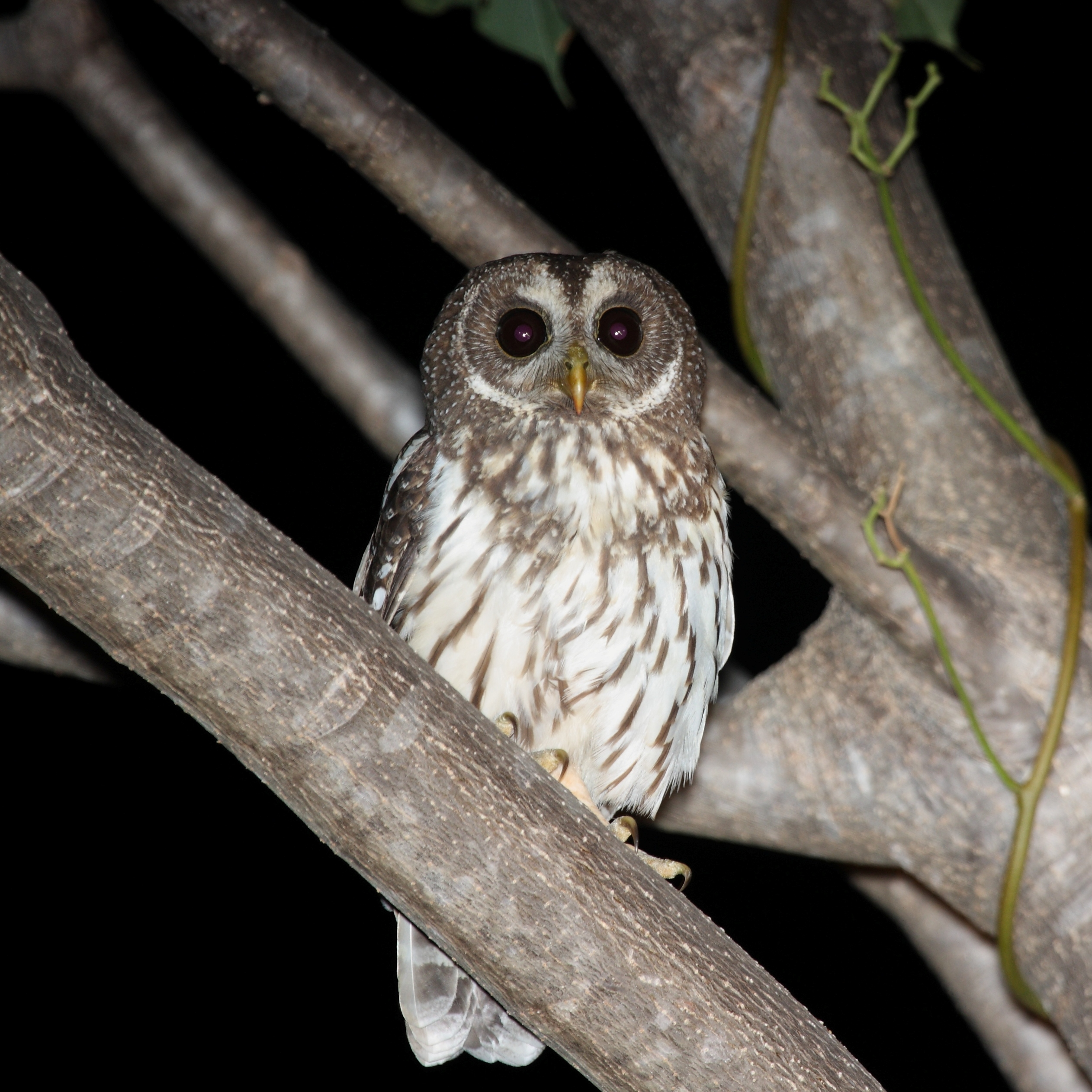
Mottled owl

Order: Strigiformes Family: Strigidae

- Tropical screech owl (Megascops choliba)
- Alagoas screech owl (Megascops alagoensis)
- Spectacled owl (Pulsatrix perspicillata)
- Great horned owl (Bubo virginianus)
- Pernambuco pygmy-owl (Glaucidium mooreorum) (EP)
- Ferruginous pygmy-owl (Glaucidium brasilianum)
- Burrowing owl (Athene cunicularia)
- Mottled owl (Strix virgata)
- Striped owl (Asio clamator)
- Buff-fronted owl (Aegolius harrisii)

== Trogons ==
Order: Trogoniformes Family: Trogonidae

- Blue-crowned trogon (Trogon curucui)

== Motmots ==
Order: Coraciiformes Family: Momotidae

- Amazonian motmot (Momotus momota)

== Kingfishers ==
Order: Coraciiformes Family: Alcedinidae

- Ringed kingfisher (Megaceryle torquata)
- Amazon kingfisher (Chloroceryle amazona)
- American pygmy kingfisher (Chloroceryle aenea)
- Green kingfisher (Chloroceryle americana)

== Puffbirds ==
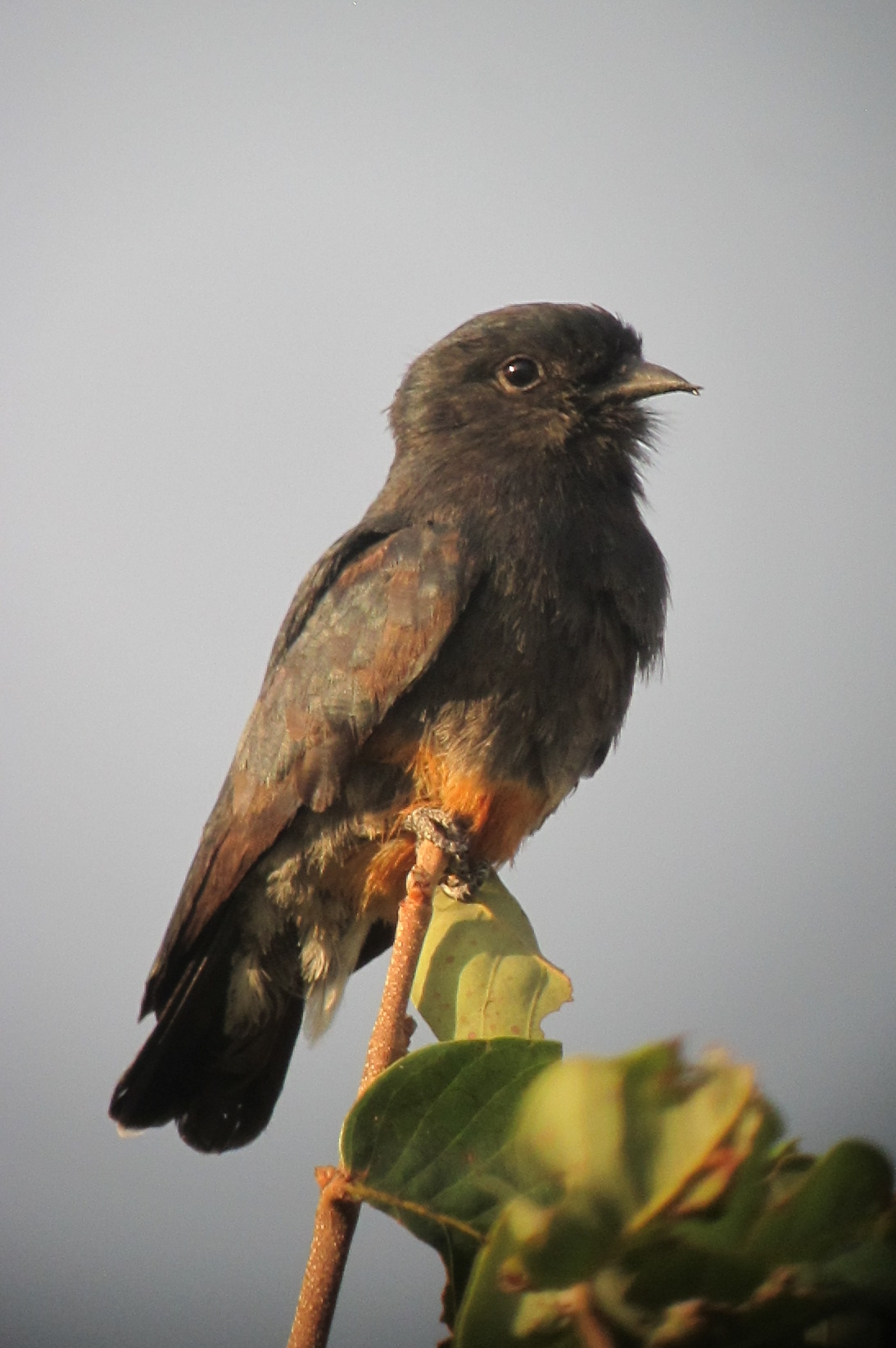
Swallow-winged puffbird

Order: Piciformes Family: Bucconidae

- Spot-backed puffbird (Nystalus maculatus)
- Black-fronted nunbird (Monasa nigrifrons)
- Swallow-winged puffbird (Chelidoptera tenebrosa)

== Jacamars ==
Order: Piciformes Family: Galbulidae

- Rufous-tailed jacamar (Galbula ruficauda)

== Toucans ==
Order: Piciformes Family: Ramphastidae

- Saffron toucanet (Pteroglossus bailloni) (EB)
- Lettered aracari (Pteroglossus inscriptus)
- Black-necked aracari (Pteroglossus aracari)
- Channel-billed toucan (Ramphastos vitellinus)

== Woodpeckers and piculets ==
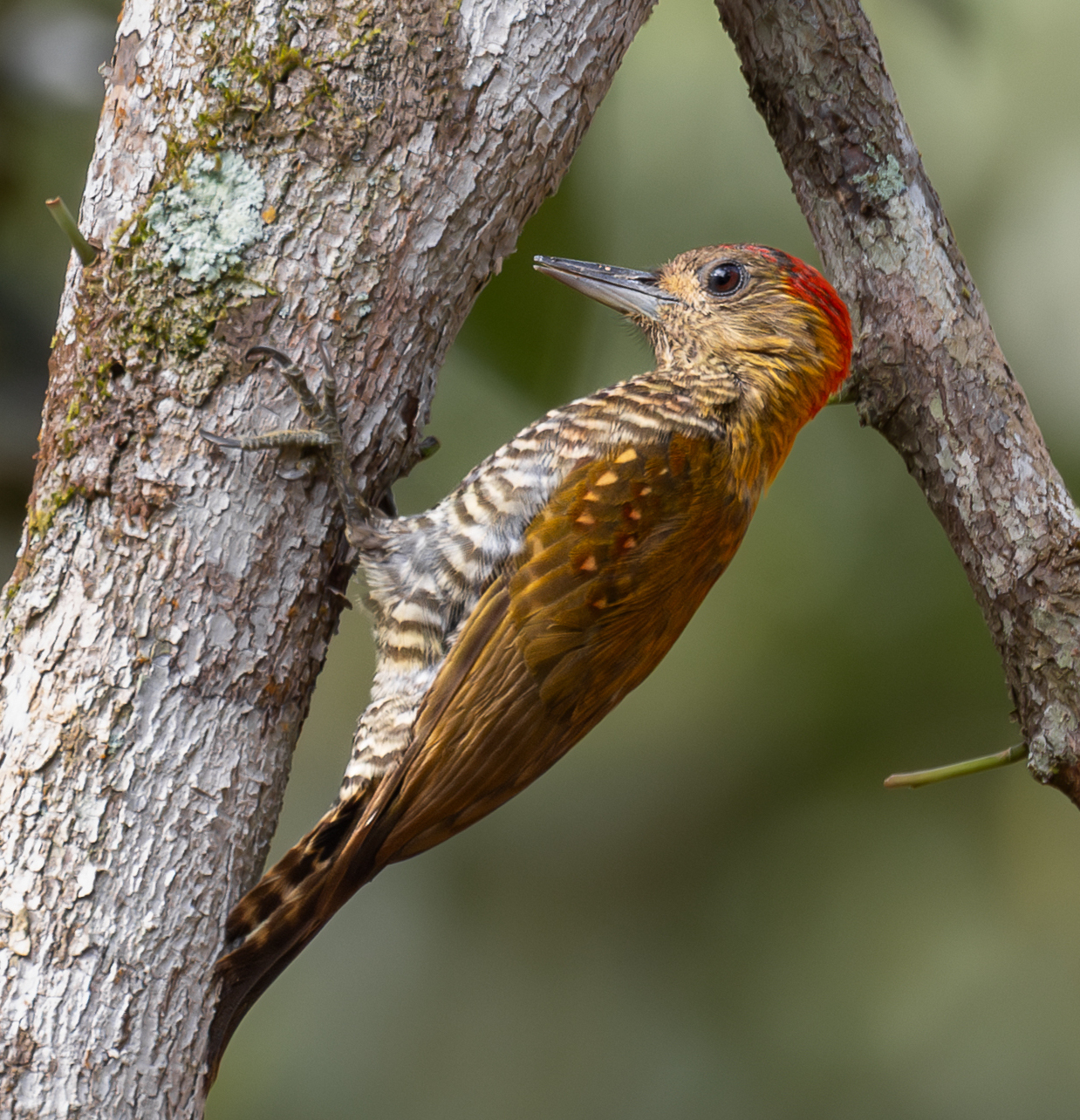
Red-stained woodpecker

Order: Piciformes Family: Picidae

- Golden-spangled piculet (Picumnus exilis)
- Spotted piculet (Picumnus pygmaeus) (EB)
- Ochraceous piculet (Picumnus limae) (EB)
- White woodpecker (Melanerpes candidus)
- Little woodpecker (Dryobates passerinus)
- Red-stained woodpecker (Dryobates affinis)
- Crimson-crested woodpecker (Campephilus melanoleucos)
- Lineated woodpecker (Dryocopus lineatus)
- Ochre-backed woodpecker (Celeus ochraceus) (EB)
- Golden-green woodpecker (Piculus chrysochloros)
- Green-barred woodpecker (Colaptes melanochloros)
- Campo flicker (Colaptes campestris)

== Seriemas ==
Order: Cariamiformes Family: Cariamidae

- Red-legged seriema (Cariama cristata)

== Falcons ==
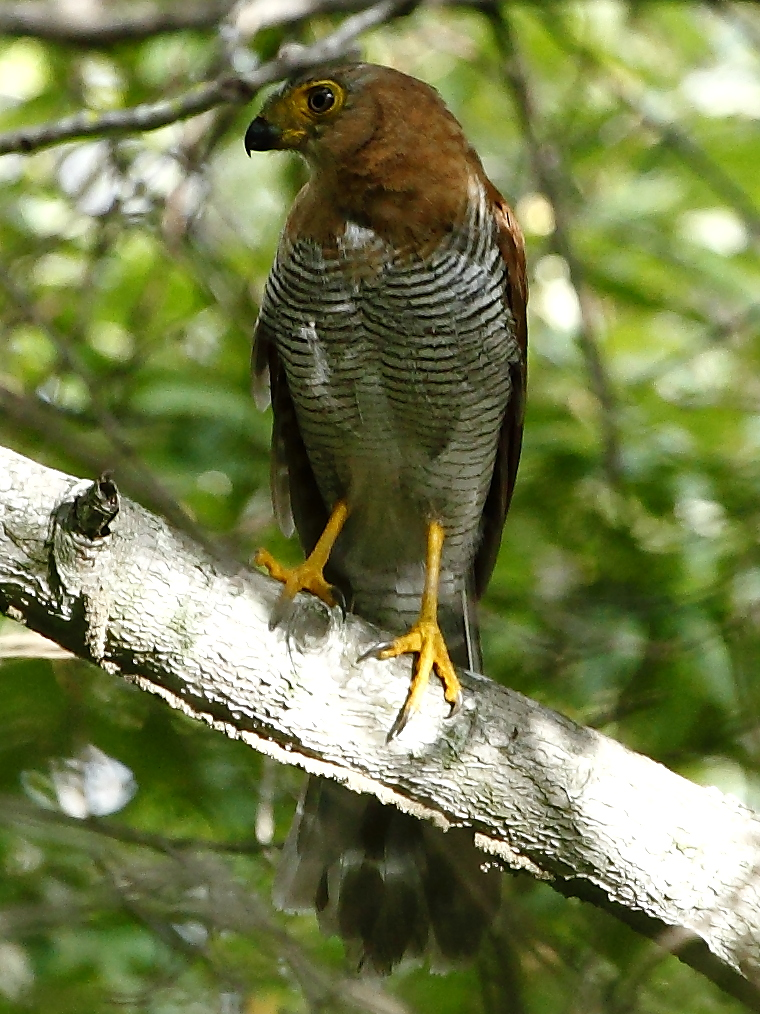
Barred forest falcon

Order: Falconiformes Family: Falconidae

- Laughing falcon (Herpetotheres cachinnans)
- Barred forest falcon (Micrastur ruficollis)
- Collared forest falcon (Micrastur semitorquatus)
- Crested caracara (Caracara plancus)
- Yellow-headed caracara (Daptrius chimachima)
- Eurasian kestrel (Falco tinnunculus) (A)
- American kestrel (Falco sparverius)
- Eurasian hobby (Falco subbuteo)
- Aplomado falcon (Falco femoralis)
- Bat falcon (Falco rufigularis)
- Peregrine falcon (Falco peregrinus)

== Parrots ==
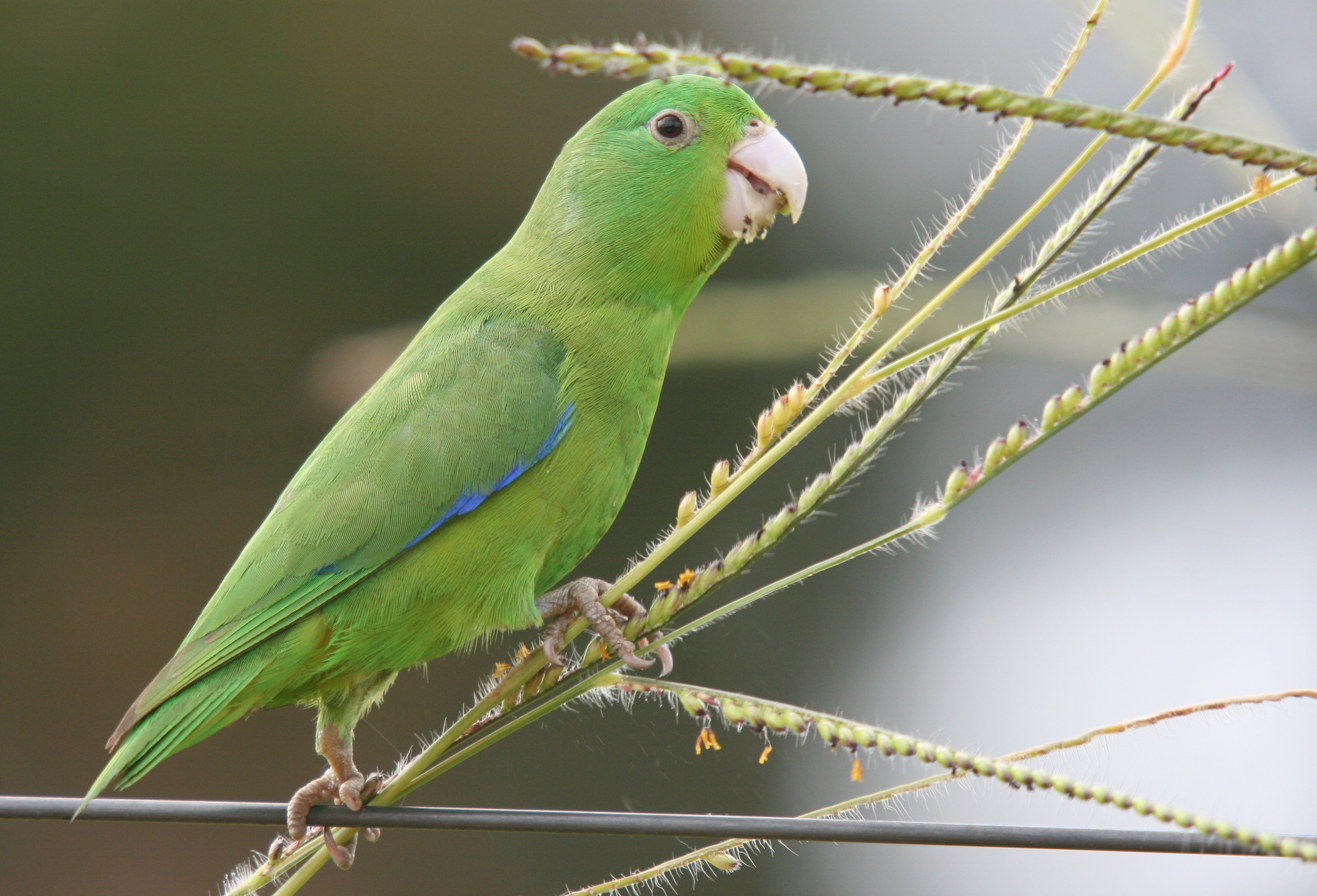
Cobalt-rumped parrotlet

Order: Psittaciformes Family: Psittacidae

- Golden-tailed parrotlet (Touit surdus) (EB)
- Plain parakeet (Brotogeris tirica) (EB)
- Yellow-chevroned parakeet (Brotogeris chiriri)
- Scaly-headed parrot (Pionus maximiliani)
- Turquoise-fronted amazon (Amazona aestiva)
- Orange-winged amazon (Amazona amazonica)
- Cobalt-rumped parrotlet (Forpus xanthopterygius)
- Pearly parakeet (Pyrrhura lepida) (EB) (I)
- Grey-breasted parakeet (Pyrrhura griseipectus) (EB)
- Peach-fronted parakeet (Eupsittula aurea)
- Cactus parakeet (Eupsittula cactorum) (EB)
- Nanday parakeet (Aratinga nenday) (A)
- Jandaya parakeet (Aratinga jandaya) (EB)
- Spix's macaw (Cyanopsitta spixii) (EB)(EW)
- Blue-winged macaw (Primolius maracana)
- Red-and-green macaw (Ara chloropterus)
- Blue-crowned parakeet (Thectocercus acuticaudatus)
- Red-shouldered macaw (Diopsittaca nobilis)

== Antbirds ==
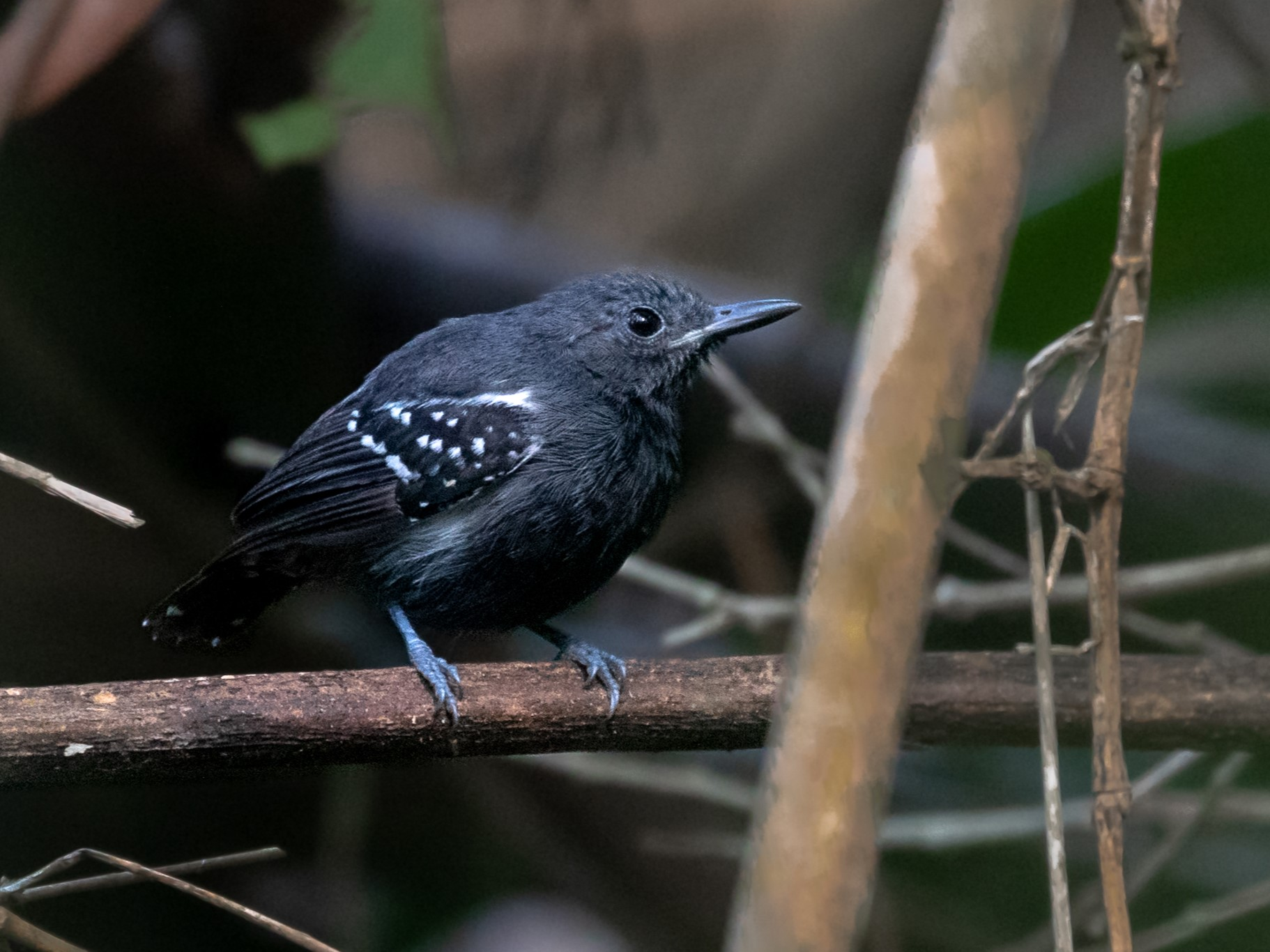
White-flanked antwren

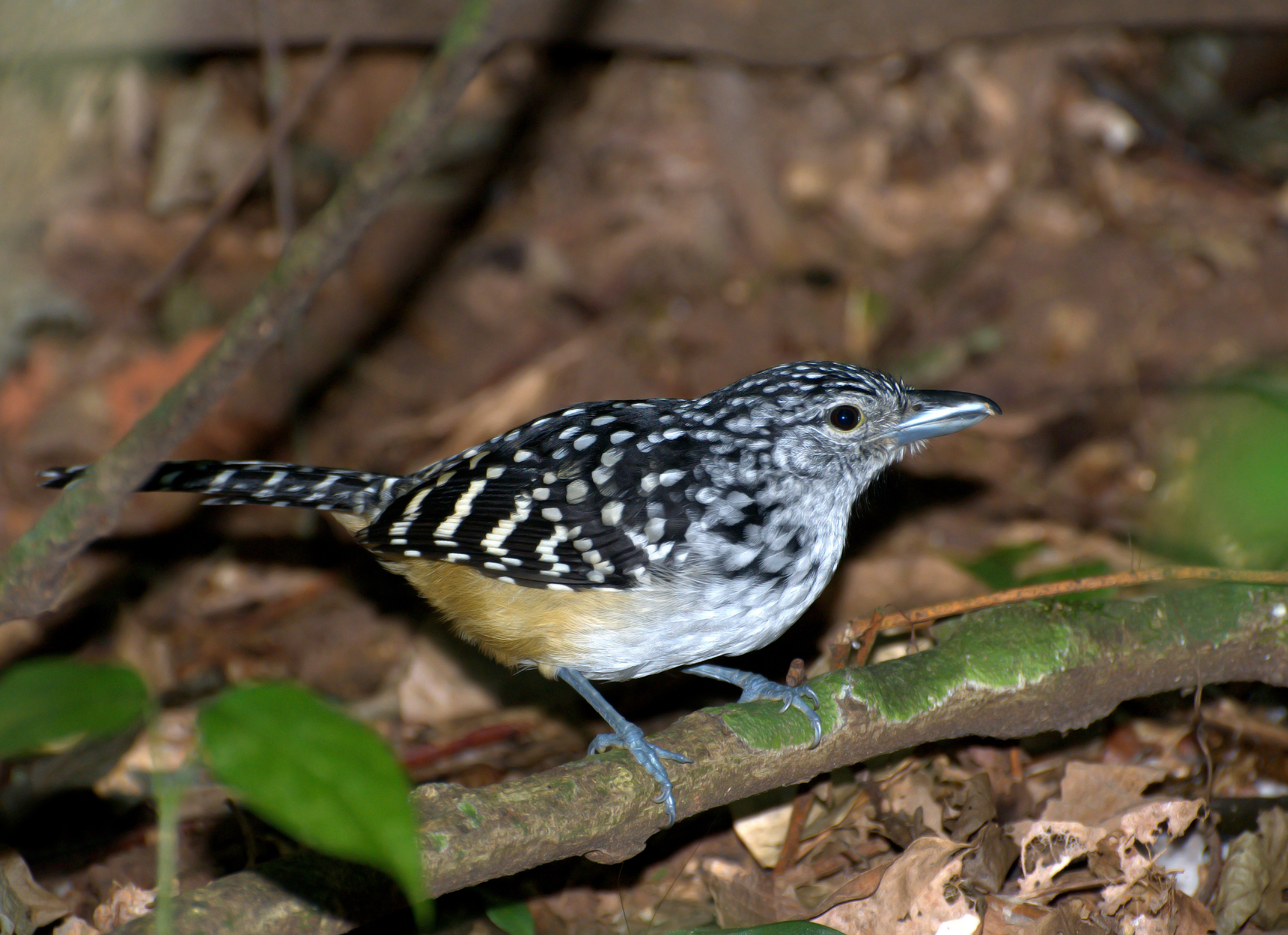
Spot-backed antshrike

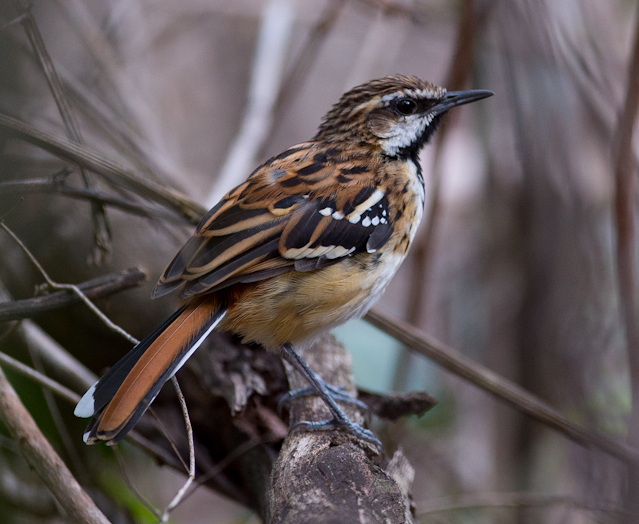
Stripe-backed antbird

Order: Passeriformes Family: Thamnophilidae

- Stripe-backed antbird (Myrmorchilus strigilatus)
- Orange-bellied antwren (Terenura sicki) (EB)
- White-flanked antwren (Myrmotherula axillaris)
- Alagoas antwren (Myrmotherula snowi) (EB)
- Southern white-fringed antwren (Formicivora grisea)
- Black-bellied antwren (Formicivora melanogaster)
- Rusty-backed antwren (Formicivora rufa)
- Silvery-cheeked antshrike (Sakesphoroides cristatus) (EB)
- Cinereous antshrike (Thamnomanes caesius)
- Plain antvireo (Dysithamnus mentalis)
- Rusty-winged antwren (Herpsilochmus frater)
- Black-capped antwren (Herpsilochmus atricapillus)
- Barred antshrike (Thamnophilus doliatus)
- Rufous-winged antshrike (Thamnophilus torquatus)
- Chestnut-backed antshrike (Thamnophilus palliatus)
- Spot-backed antshrike (Hypoedaleus guttatus)
- Great antshrike (Taraba major)
- Caatinga antwren (Radinopsyche sellowi) (EB)
- Planalto slaty-antshrike (Thamnophilus pelzelni) (EB)
- Variable antshrike (Thamnophilus caerulescens)
- White-shouldered antshrike (Thamnophilus aethiops)
- Pectoral antwren (Herpsilochmus pectoralis) (EB)
- Scaled antbird (Drymophila squamata) (EB)
- Willis's antbird (Cercomacroides laeta) (EB)
- East Amazonian fire-eye (Pyriglena leuconota) (EB)
- Scalloped antbird (Myrmoderus ruficauda) (EB)(Ex)

== Gnateaters ==
Order: Passeriformes Family: Conopophagidae

- Black-cheeked gnateater (Conopophaga melanops) (EB)
- Ceara gnateater (Conopophaga cearae) (EB)

== Antpittas ==
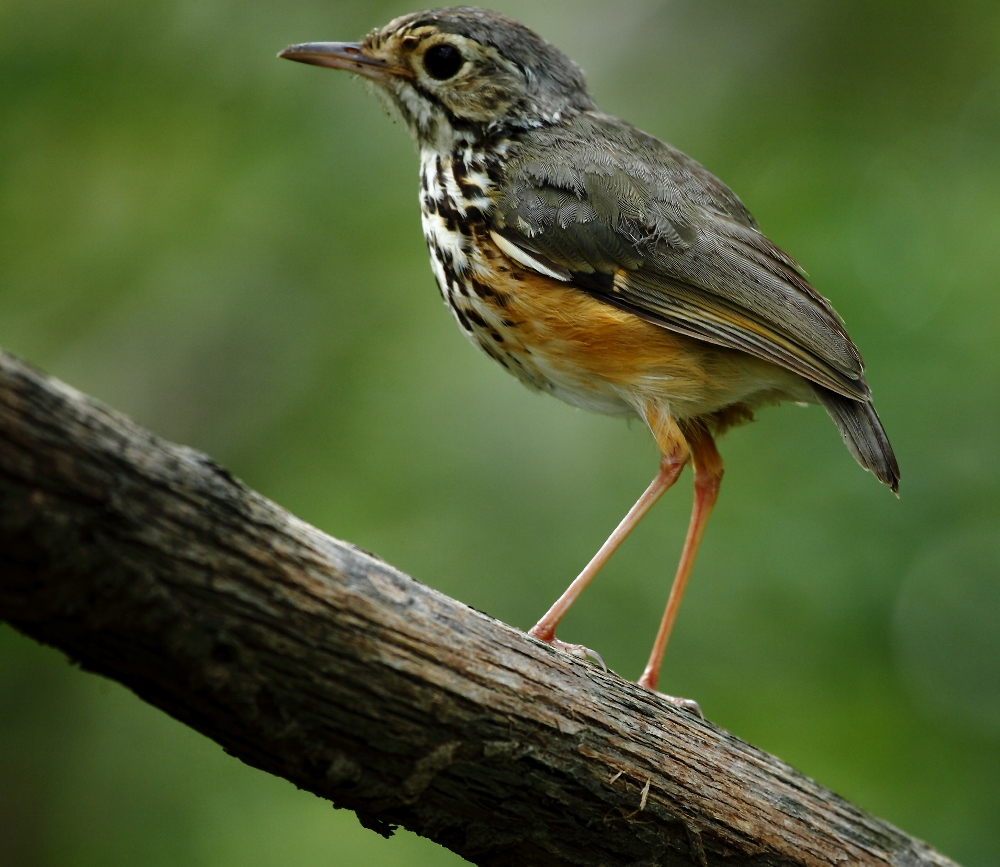
White-browed antpitta

Order: Passeriformes Family: Grallariidae

- Variegated antpitta (Grallaria varia)
- White-browed antpitta (Hylopezus ochroleucus) (EB)

== Ground antbirds ==
Order: Passeriformes Family: Formicariidae

- Rufous-capped antthrush (Formicarius colma)
- Short-tailed antthrush (Chamaeza campanisona)

== Ovenbirds ==
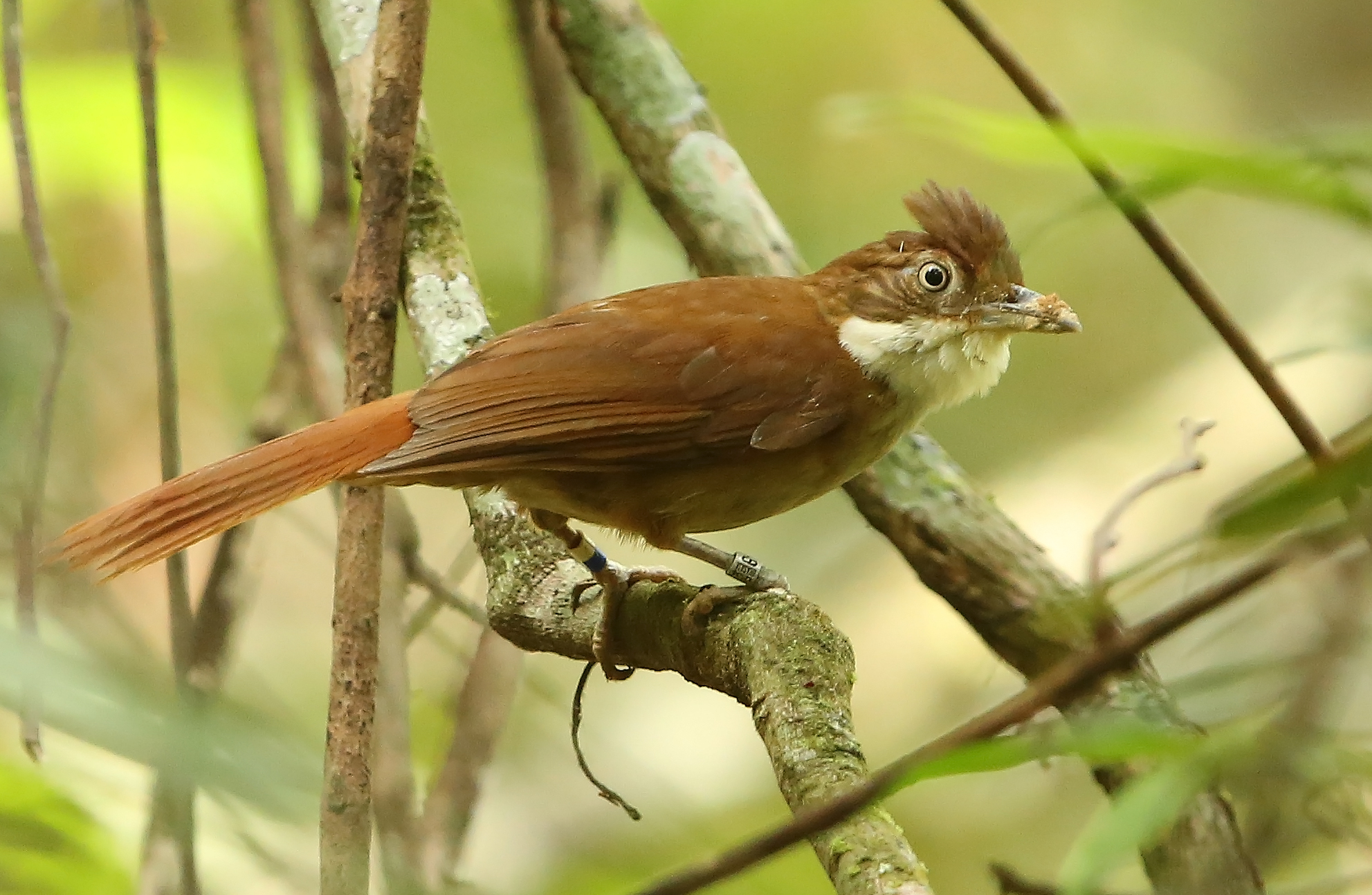
Pernambuco foliage-gleaner

Order: Passeriformes Family: Furnariidae

- Dusky leaftosser (Sclerurus obscurior)
- Black-tailed leaftosser (Sclerurus caudacutus) (A)
- Olivaceous woodcreeper (Sittasomus griseicapillus)
- Plain-brown woodcreeper (Dendrocincla fuliginosa)
- Amazonian barred woodcreeper (Dendrocolaptes certhia)
- Planalto woodcreeper (Dendrocolaptes platyrostris)
- Moustached woodcreeper (Xiphocolaptes falcirostris) (EB)
- Ceara woodcreeper (Xiphorhynchus atlanticus) (EB)
- Lesser woodcreeper (Xiphorhynchus fuscus)
- Buff-throated woodcreeper (Xiphorhynchus guttatus)
- Straight-billed woodcreeper (Dendroplex picus)
- Red-billed scythebill (Campylorhamphus trochilirostris)
- Narrow-billed woodcreeper (Lepidocolaptes angustirostris)
- Plain xenops (Xenops genibarbis)
- Amazonian plain xenops (Xenops genibarbis)
- Streaked xenops (Xenops rutilans)
- Wing-banded hornero (Furnarius figulus) (EB)
- Pale-legged hornero (Furnarius leucopus)
- Rufous hornero (Furnarius rufus)
- Great xenops (Megaxenops parnaguae) (EB)
- Cryptic treehunter (Cichlocolaptes mazarbarnetti) (EB)(X)
- Alagoas foliage-gleaner (Philydor novaesi) (EB)(X)
- Pernambuco foliage-gleaner (Automolus lammi) (EB)
- Rufous-fronted thornbird (Phacellodomus rufifrons)
- Greater thornbird (Phacellodomus ruber)
- Rusty-backed spinetail (Cranioleuca vulpina)
- Grey-headed spinetail (Cranioleuca semicinerea) (EB)
- Caatinga cacholote (Pseudoseisura cristata)
- Yellow-chinned spinetail (Certhiaxis cinnamomeus)
- Ochre-cheeked spinetail (Synallaxis scutata)
- Red-shouldered spinetail (Synallaxis hellmayri)
- Pinto's spinetail (Synallaxis infuscata) (EB)
- Cinereous-breasted spinetail (Synallaxis hypospodia)
- Pale-breasted spinetail (Synallaxis albescens)
- Sooty-fronted spinetail (Synallaxis frontalis)

== Manakins ==
Order: Passeriformes Family: Pipridae

- Pale-bellied tyrant-manakin (Neopelma pallescens)
- Blue-backed manakin (Chiroxiphia pareola)
- White-bearded manakin (Manacus manacus)
- Red-headed manakin (Ceratopipra rubrocapilla)
- Araripe manakin (Chiroxiphia bokermanni) (EB)

== Cotingas ==
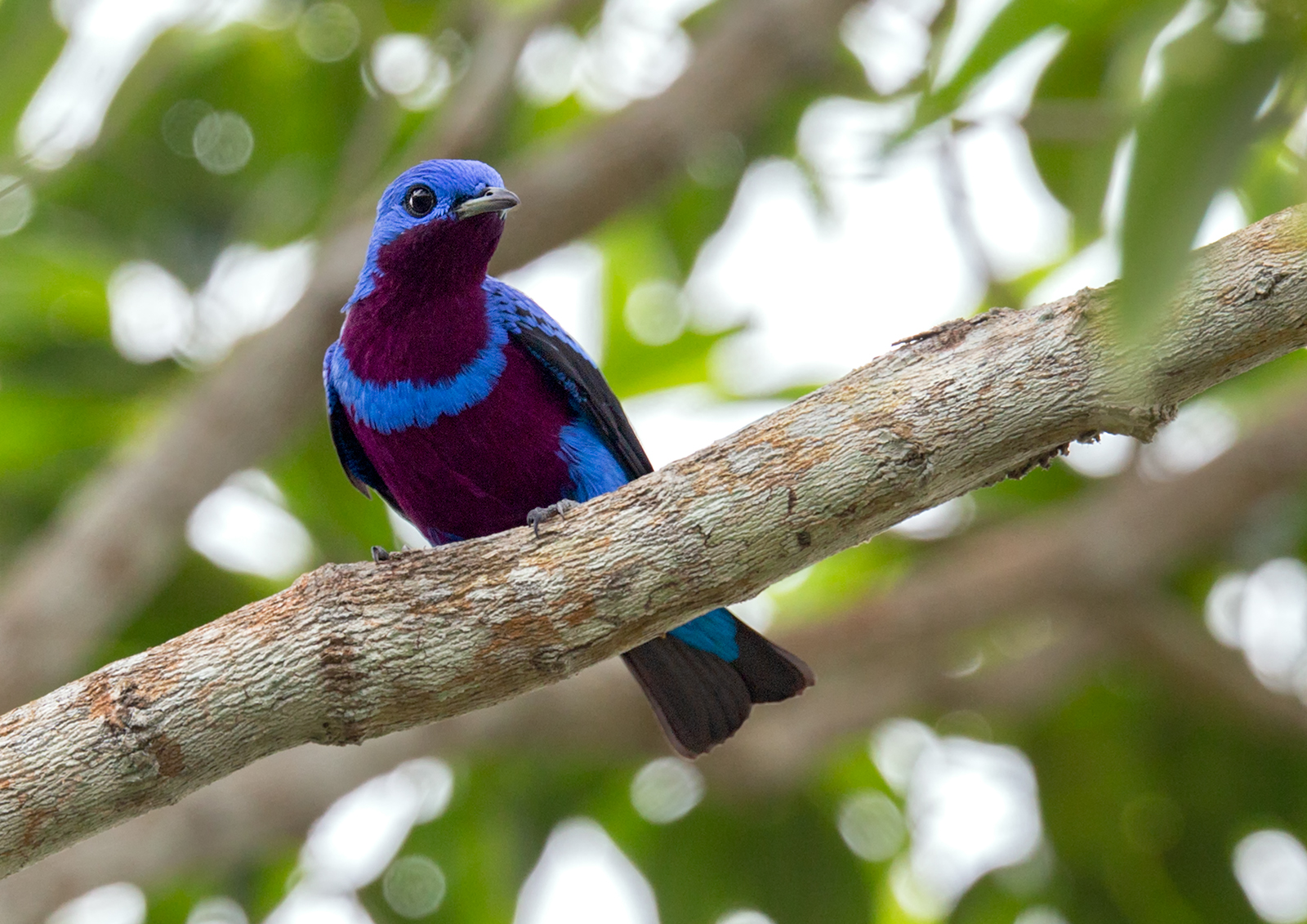
Banded cotinga

Order: Passeriformes Family: Cotingidae

- Banded cotinga (Cotinga maculata) (EB)
- Screaming piha (Lipaugus vociferans)
- Bearded bellbird (Procnias averano)
- White-winged cotinga (Xipholena atropurpurea) (EB)

== Tityras, mourners, and allies ==
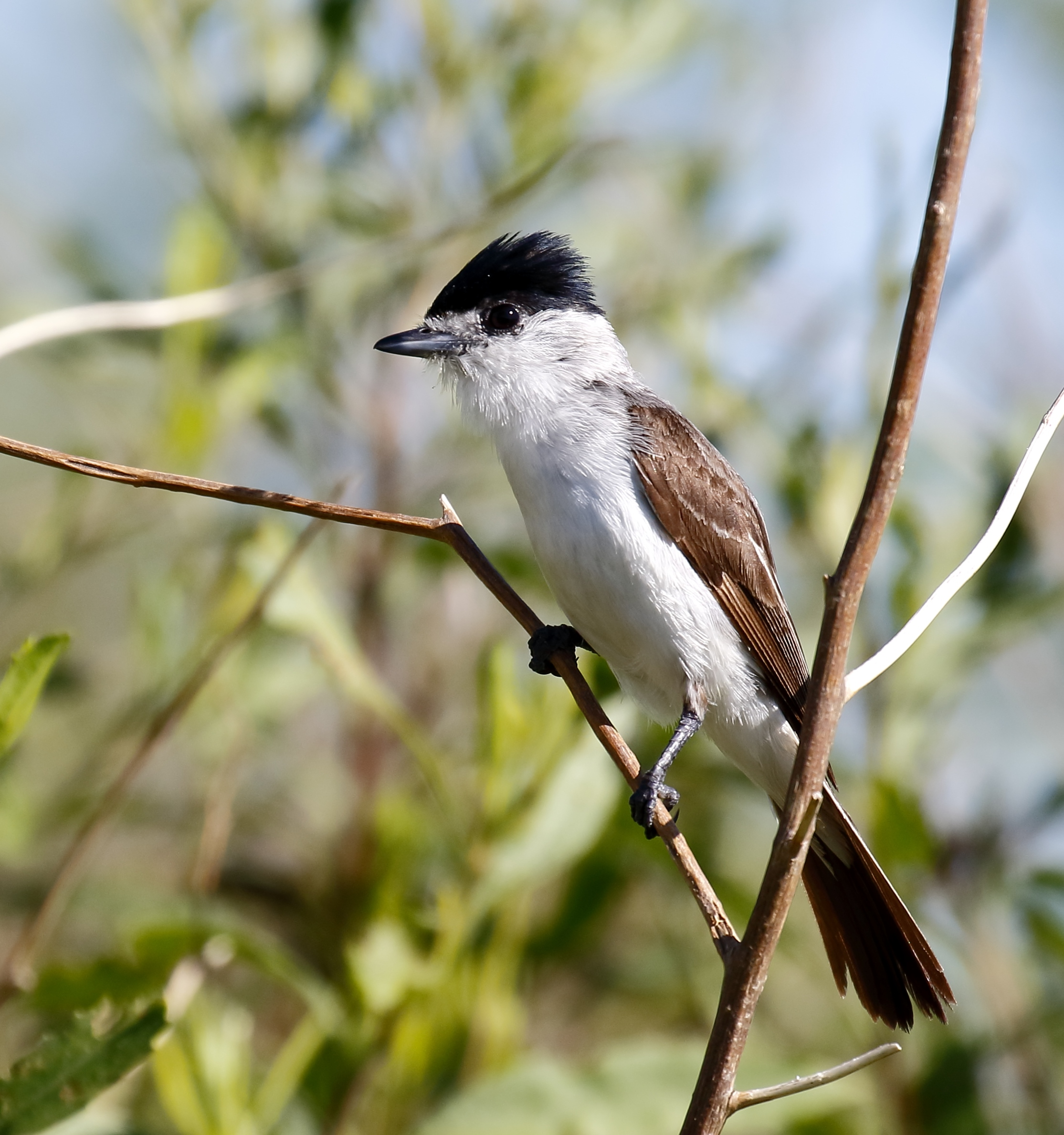
White-naped xenopsaris

Order: Passeriformes Family: Tityridae

- Black-tailed tityra (Tityra cayana)
- Black-crowned tityra (Tityra inquisitor)
- Brown-winged schiffornis (Schiffornis turdina)
- Buff-throated purpletuft (Iodopleura pipra) (EB)
- White-naped xenopsaris (Xenopsaris albinucha)
- Green-backed becard (Pachyramphus viridis)
- White-winged becard (Pachyramphus polychopterus)
- Black-capped becard (Pachyramphus marginatus)
- Crested becard (Pachyramphus validus)

== Sharpbill ==
Order: Passeriformes Family: Oxyruncidae

- Sharpbill (Oxyruncus cristatus)

== Royal flycatchers and allies ==
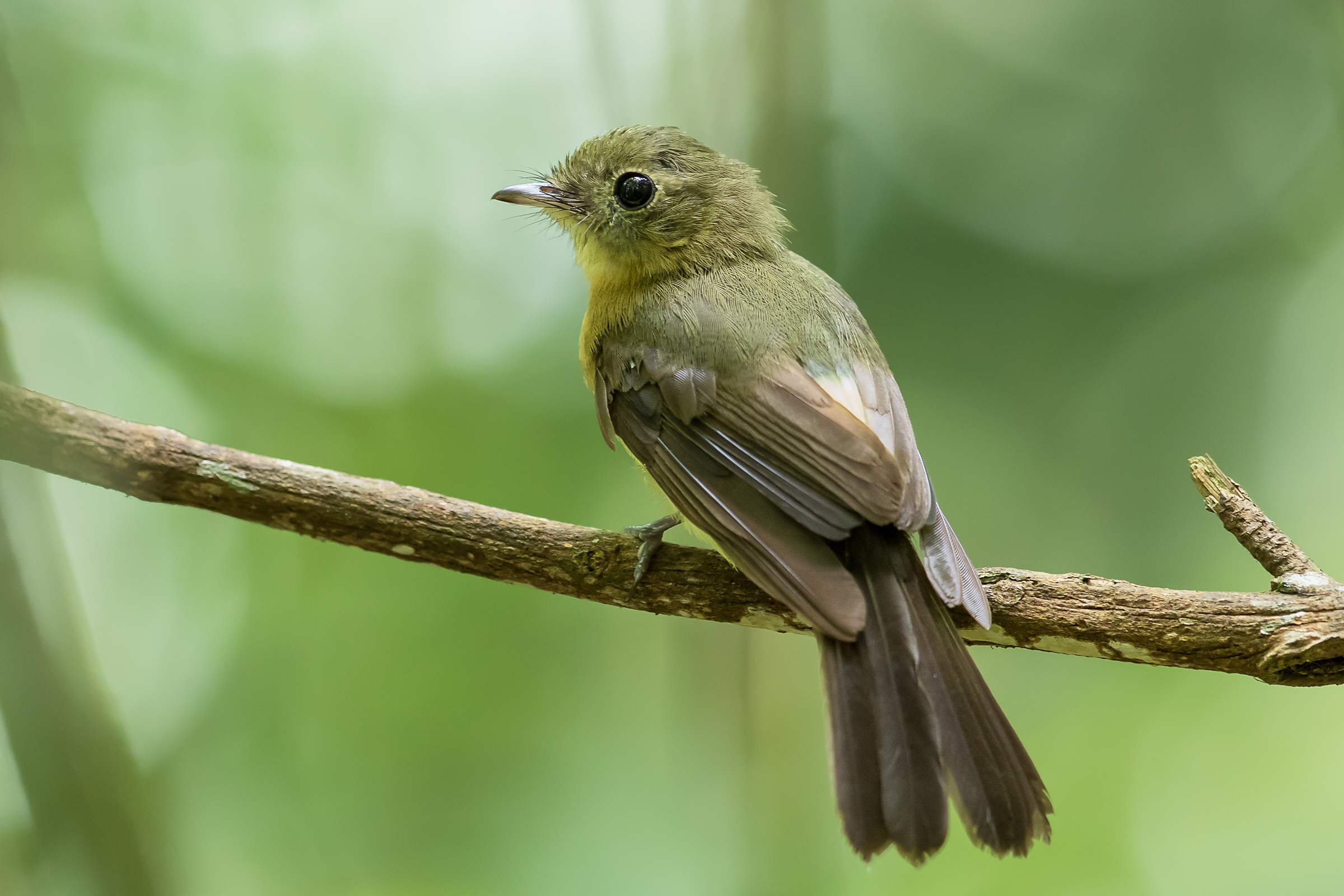
Whiskered flycatcher

Order: Passeriformes Family: Onychorhynchidae

- Whiskered flycatcher (Myiobius barbatus)
- Black-tailed flycatcher (Myiobius atricaudus)

== Tyrant flycatchers ==
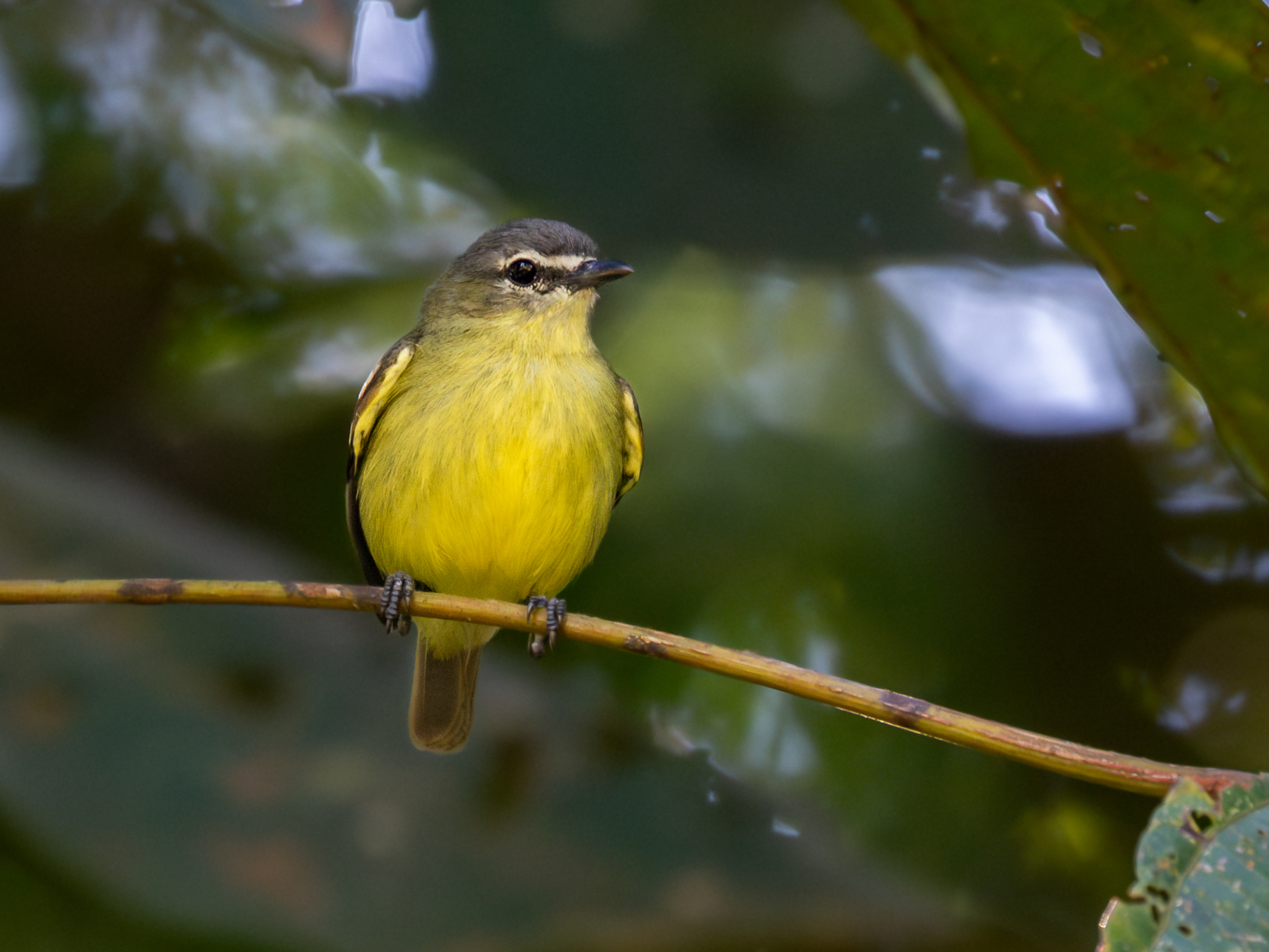
White-lored tyrannulet

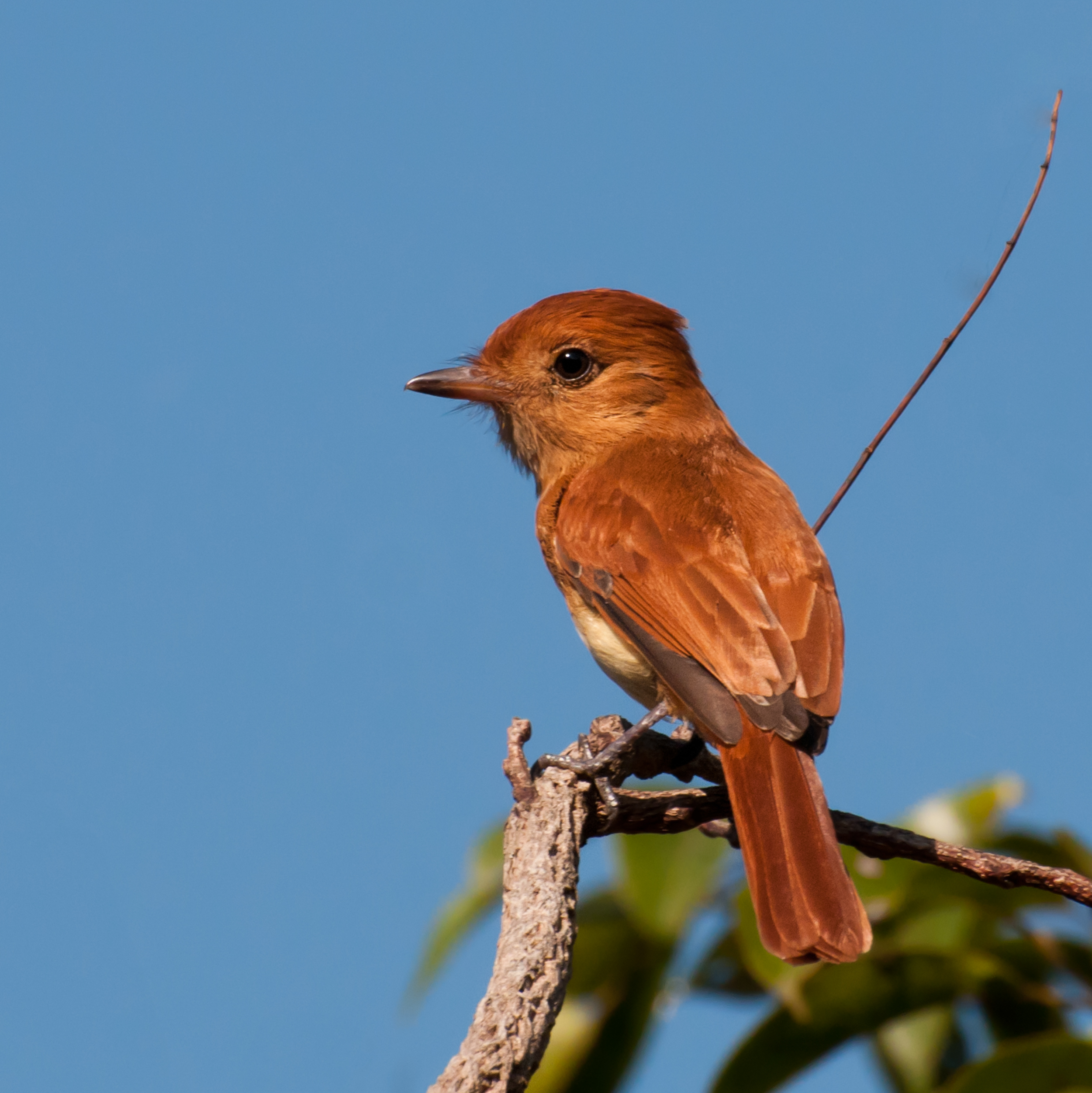
Rufous casiornis

Order: Passeriformes Family: Tyrannidae

- Wing-barred piprites (Piprites chloris)
- White-throated spadebill (Platyrinchus mystaceus)
- Ochre-bellied flycatcher (Mionectes oleagineus)
- Sepia-capped flycatcher (Leptopogon amaurocephalus)
- Alagoas tyrannulet (Phylloscartes ceciliae) (EB)
- Eared pygmy-tyrant (Myiornis auricularis)
- White-bellied tody-tyrant (Hemitriccus griseipectus)
- Stripe-necked tody-tyrant (Hemitriccus striaticollis)
- Pearly-vented tody-tyrant (Hemitriccus margaritaceiventer)
- Buff-breasted tody-tyrant (Hemitriccus mirandae) (EB)
- Ochre-faced tody-flycatcher (Poecilotriccus plumbeiceps)
- Smoky-fronted tody-flycatcher (Poecilotriccus fumifrons)
- Common tody-flycatcher (Todirostrum cinereum)
- Eastern olivaceous flatbill (Rhynchocyclus olivaceus)
- Yellow-olive flatbill (Tolmomyias sulphurescens)
- Grey-crowned flatbill (Tolmomyias poliocephalus)
- Ochre-lored flatbill (Tolmomyias flaviventris)
- Cliff flycatcher (Hirundinea ferruginea)
- White-lored tyrannulet (Ornithion inerme)
- Southern beardless-tyrannulet (Camptostoma obsoletum)
- Suiriri flycatcher (Suiriri suiriri)
- Mouse-coloured tyrannulet (Nesotriccus murinus)
- Yellow tyrannulet (Capsiempis flaveola)
- Forest elaenia (Myiopagis gaimardii)
- Grey-headed elaenia (Myiopagis caniceps)
- Greenish elaenia (Myiopagis viridicata)
- Plain-crested elaenia (Elaenia cristata)
- Yellow-bellied elaenia (Elaenia flavogaster)
- Large elaenia (Elaenia spectabilis)
- Noronha elaenia (Elaenia ridleyana) (EP)
- Olivaceous elaenia (Elaenia mesoleuca)
- Lesser elaenia (Elaenia chiriquensis)
- White-crested elaenia (Elaenia albiceps)
- White-crested tyrannulet (Serpophaga subcristata)
- Planalto tyrannulet (Phyllomyias fasciatus)
- Guianan tyrannulet (Zimmerius acer)
- Fulvous-crowned scrub-tyrant (Euscarthmus meloryphus)
- Lesser wagtail-tyrant (Stigmatura napensis)
- Bahia wagtail-tyrant (Stigmatura bahiae) (EB)
- Bran-coloured flycatcher (Myiophobus fasciatus)
- Euler's flycatcher (Lathrotriccus euleri)
- Southern tropical pewee (Contopus cinereus)
- Fuscous flycatcher (Cnemotriccus fuscatus)
- Southern scrub-flycatcher (Sublegatus modestus)
- Vermilion flycatcher (Pyrocephalus rubinus)
- Velvety black-tyrant (Knipolegus nigerrimus) (EB)
- Yellow-browed tyrant (Satrapa icterophrys)
- White monjita (Xolmis irupero)
- White-rumped monjita (Xolmis velatus)
- White-headed marsh-tyrant (Arundinicola leucocephala)
- Black-backed water-tyrant (Fluvicola albiventer)
- Masked water-tyrant (Fluvicola nengeta)
- Bright-rumped attila (Attila spadiceus)
- Rufous casiornis (Casiornis rufus)
- Ash-throated casiornis (Casiornis fuscus)
- Greyish mourner (Rhytipterna simplex)
- Dusky-capped flycatcher (Myiarchus tuberculifer)
- Swainson's flycatcher (Myiarchus swainsoni)
- Short-crested flycatcher (Myiarchus ferox)
- Brown-crested flycatcher (Myiarchus tyrannulus)
- Cattle tyrant (Machetornis rixosa)
- Lesser kiskadee (Philohydor lictor)
- Great kiskadee (Pitangus sulphuratus)
- Boat-billed flycatcher (Megarynchus pitangua)
- Rusty-margined flycatcher (Myiozetetes cayanensis)
- Social flycatcher (Myiozetetes similis)
- Streaked flycatcher (Myiodynastes maculatus)
- Piratic flycatcher (Legatus leucophaius)
- Variegated flycatcher (Empidonomus varius)
- White-throated kingbird (Tyrannus albogularis)
- Tropical kingbird (Tyrannus melancholicus)
- Fork-tailed flycatcher (Tyrannus savana)

== Vireos and allies ==
Order: Passeriformes Family: Vireonidae

- Rufous-browed peppershrike (Cyclarhis gujanensis)
- Grey-eyed greenlet (Hylophilus amaurocephalus) (EB)
- Chivi vireo (Vireo chivi)
- Noronha vireo (Vireo gracilirostris) (EP)

== Crows, jays, and allies ==
Order: Passeriformes Family: Corvidae

- White-naped jay (Cyanocorax cyanopogon) (EB)

== Donacobiuses ==
Order: Passeriformes Family: Donacobiidae

- Black-capped donacobius (Donacobius atricapilla)

== Swallows and martins ==
Order: Passeriformes Family: Hirundinidae

- White-winged swallow (Tachycineta albiventer)
- White-rumped swallow (Tachycineta leucorrhoa)
- Purple martin (Progne subis)
- Grey-breasted martin (Progne chalybea)
- Brown-chested martin (Progne tapera)
- Southern rough-winged swallow (Stelgidopteryx ruficollis)
- Blue-and-white swallow (Pygochelidon cyanoleuca)
- Barn swallow (Hirundo rustica)
- Cliff swallow (Petrochelidon pyrrhonota)

== Gnatcatchers and gnatwrens ==
Order: Passeriformes Family: Polioptilidae

- Long-billed gnatwren (Ramphocaenus melanurus)
- Tropical gnatcatcher (Polioptila plumbea)

== Wrens ==
Order: Passeriformes Family: Troglodytidae

- Southern house wren (Troglodytes musculus)
- Moustached wren (Pheugopedius genibarbis)
- Long-billed wren (Cantorchilus longirostris) (EB)

== Mockingbirds, thrashers, and allies ==
Order: Passeriformes Family: Mimidae

- Chalk-browed mockingbird (Mimus saturninus)
- Tropical mockingbird (Mimus gilvus)

== Thrushes ==
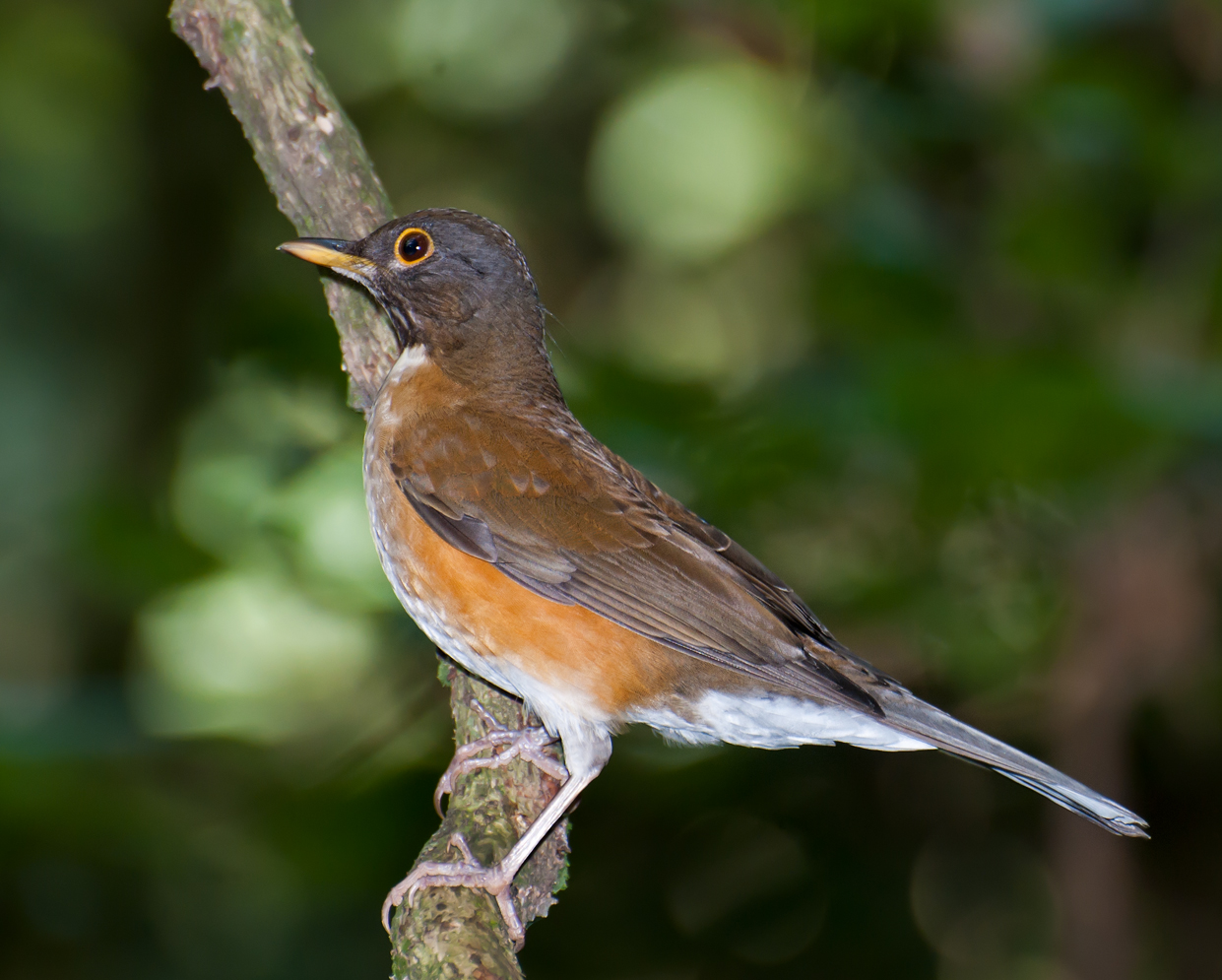
White-necked thrush

Order: Passeriformes Family: Turdidae

- Veery (Catharus fuscescens)
- Yellow-legged thrush (Turdus flavipes)
- Pale-breasted thrush (Turdus leucomelas)
- White-necked thrush (Turdus albicollis)
- Rufous-bellied thrush (Turdus rufiventris)
- Creamy-bellied thrush (Turdus amaurochalinus)

== Estrildid finches ==
Order: Passeriformes Family: Estrildidae

- Common waxbill (Estrilda astrild) (I)

== Old World sparrows ==
Order: Passeriformes Family: Passeridae

- House sparrow (Passer domesticus) (I)

== Pipits ==
Order: Passeriformes Family: Motacillidae

- Yellowish pipit (Anthus chii)

== Finches and Euphonias ==
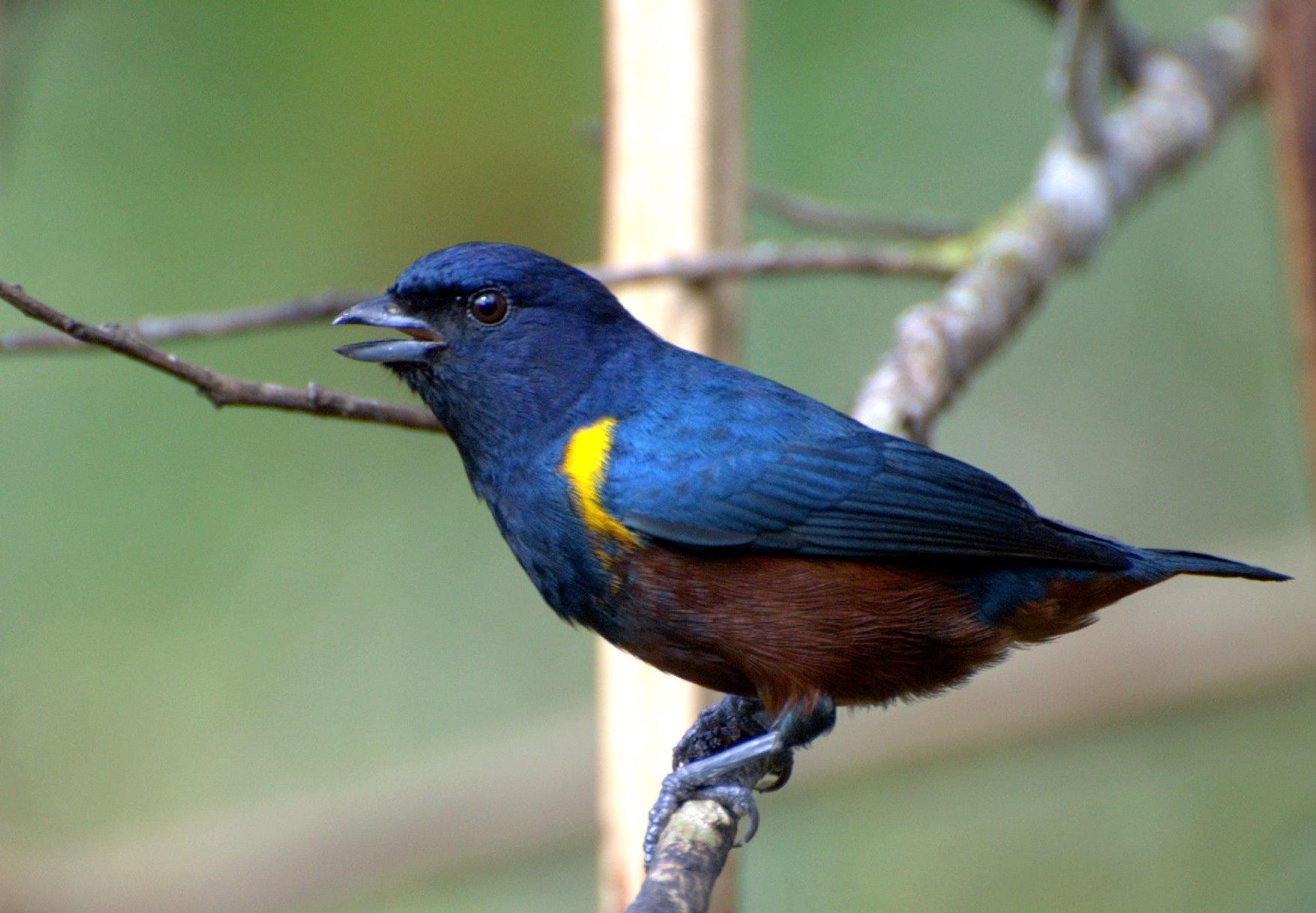
Chestnut-bellied euphonia

Order: Passeriformes Family: Fringillidae

- Golden-rumped euphonia (Chlorophonia cyanocephala)
- Purple-throated euphonia (Euphonia chlorotica)
- Violaceous euphonia (Euphonia violacea)
- Chestnut-bellied euphonia (Euphonia pectoralis)
- Yellow-faced siskin (Spinus yarrellii) (EB)

== New World sparrows ==
Order: Passeriformes Family: Passerellidae

- Grassland sparrow (Ammodramus humeralis)
- Pectoral sparrow (Arremon taciturnus)
- Rufous-collared sparrow (Zonotrichia capensis)

== Icterids ==
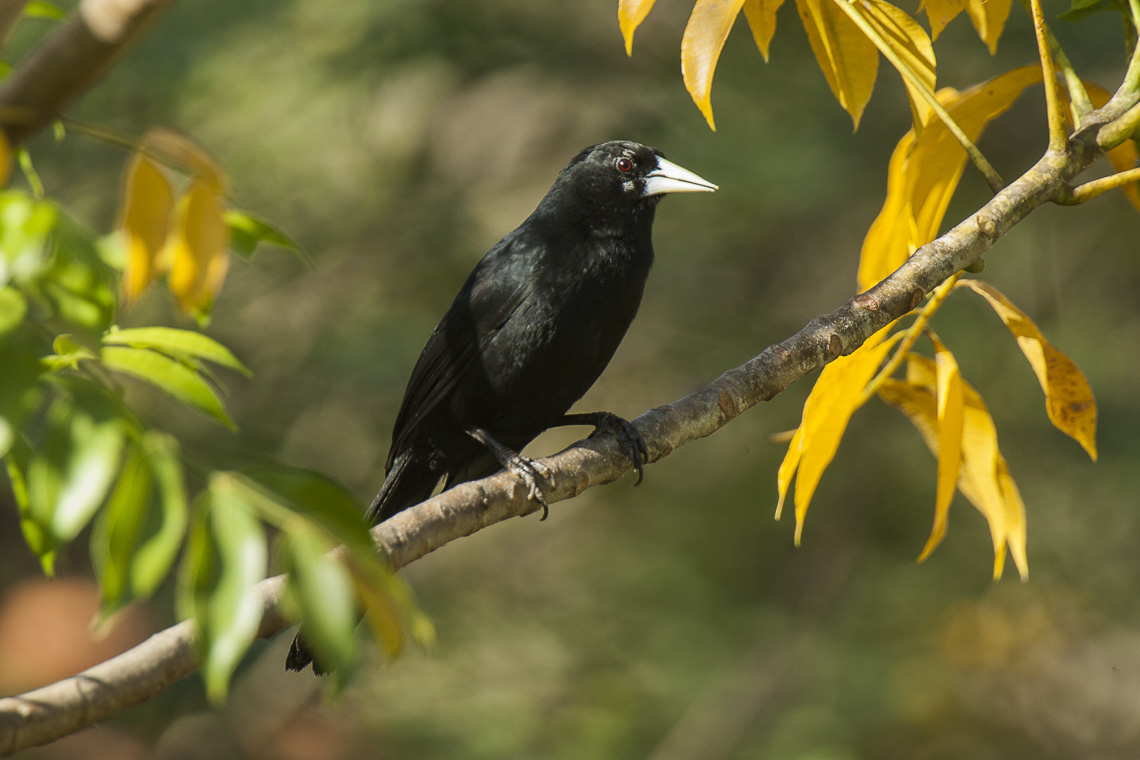
Solitary black cacique

Order: Passeriformes Family: Icteridae

- White-browed meadowlark (Leistes superciliaris)
- Crested oropendola (Psarocolius decumanus)
- Solitary black cacique (Cacicus solitarius)
- Yellow-rumped cacique (Cacicus cela)
- Variable oriole (Icterus pyrrhopterus)
- Campo troupial (Icterus jamacaii) (EB)
- Screaming cowbird (Molothrus rufoaxillaris)
- Shiny cowbird (Molothrus bonariensis)
- Giant cowbird (Molothrus oryzivorus)
- Forbe's blackbird (Anumara forbesi)
- Chopi blackbird (Gnorimopsar chopi)
- Pale baywing (Agelaioides fringillarius)
- Chestnut-capped blackbird (Chrysomus ruficapillus)

== New World warblers ==
Order: Passeriformes Family: Parulidae

- Masked yellowthroat (Geothlypis aequinoctialis)
- Tropical parula (Setophaga pitiayumi)
- Blackburnian warbler (Setophaga fusca) (A)
- Golden-crowned warbler (Basileuterus culicivorus)
- Flavescent warbler (Myiothlypis flaveola)

== Cardinals, grosbeaks, and allies ==
Order: Passeriformes Family: Cardinalidae

- Hepatic tanager (Piranga flava)
- Scarlet tanager (Piranga olivacea) (A)
- Red-crowned ant-tanager (Habia rubica)
- Yellow-green grosbeak (Caryothraustes canadensis)
- Ultramarine grosbeak (Cyanoloxia brissonii)

== South American tanagers ==
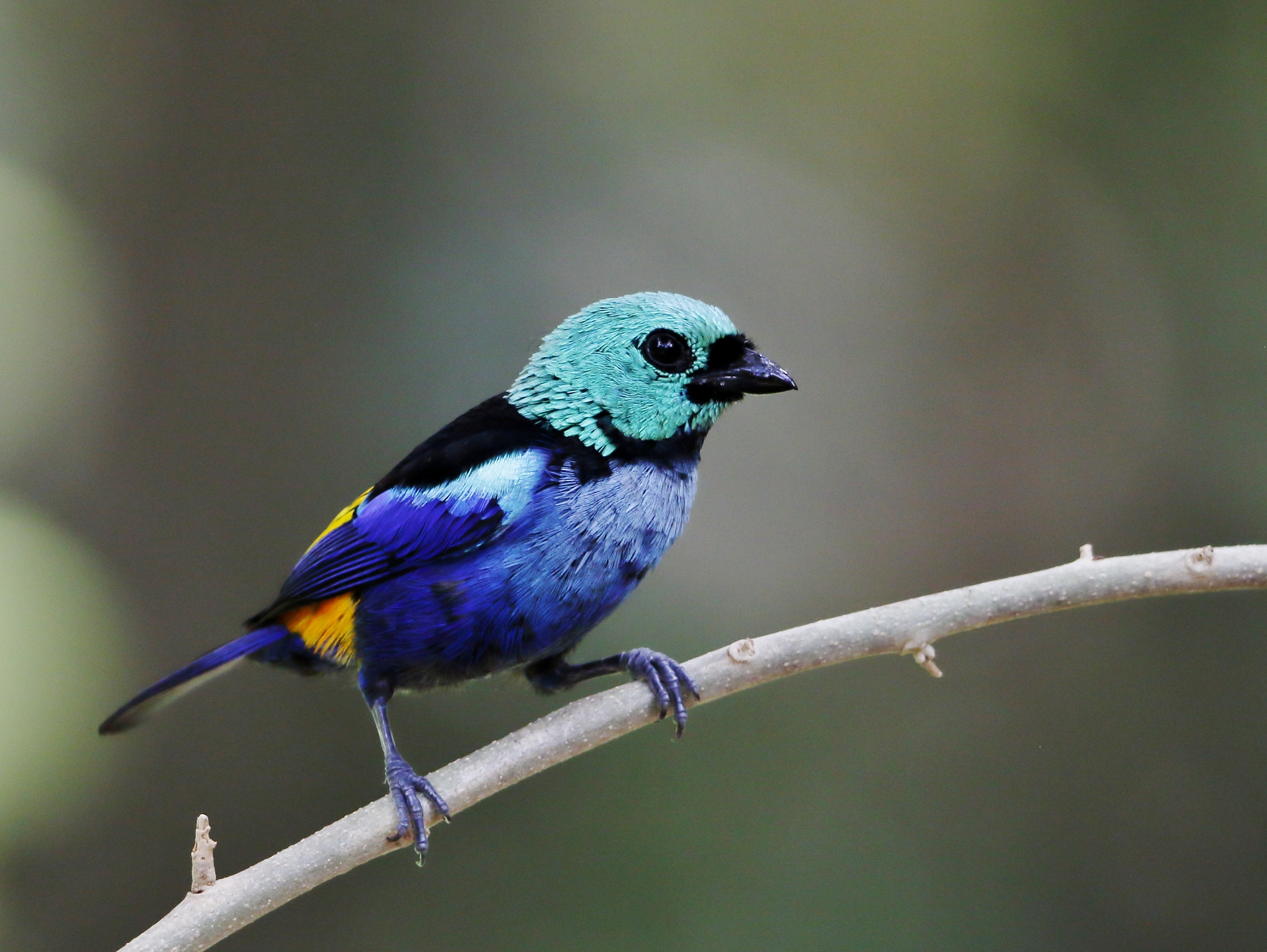
Seven-coloured tanager

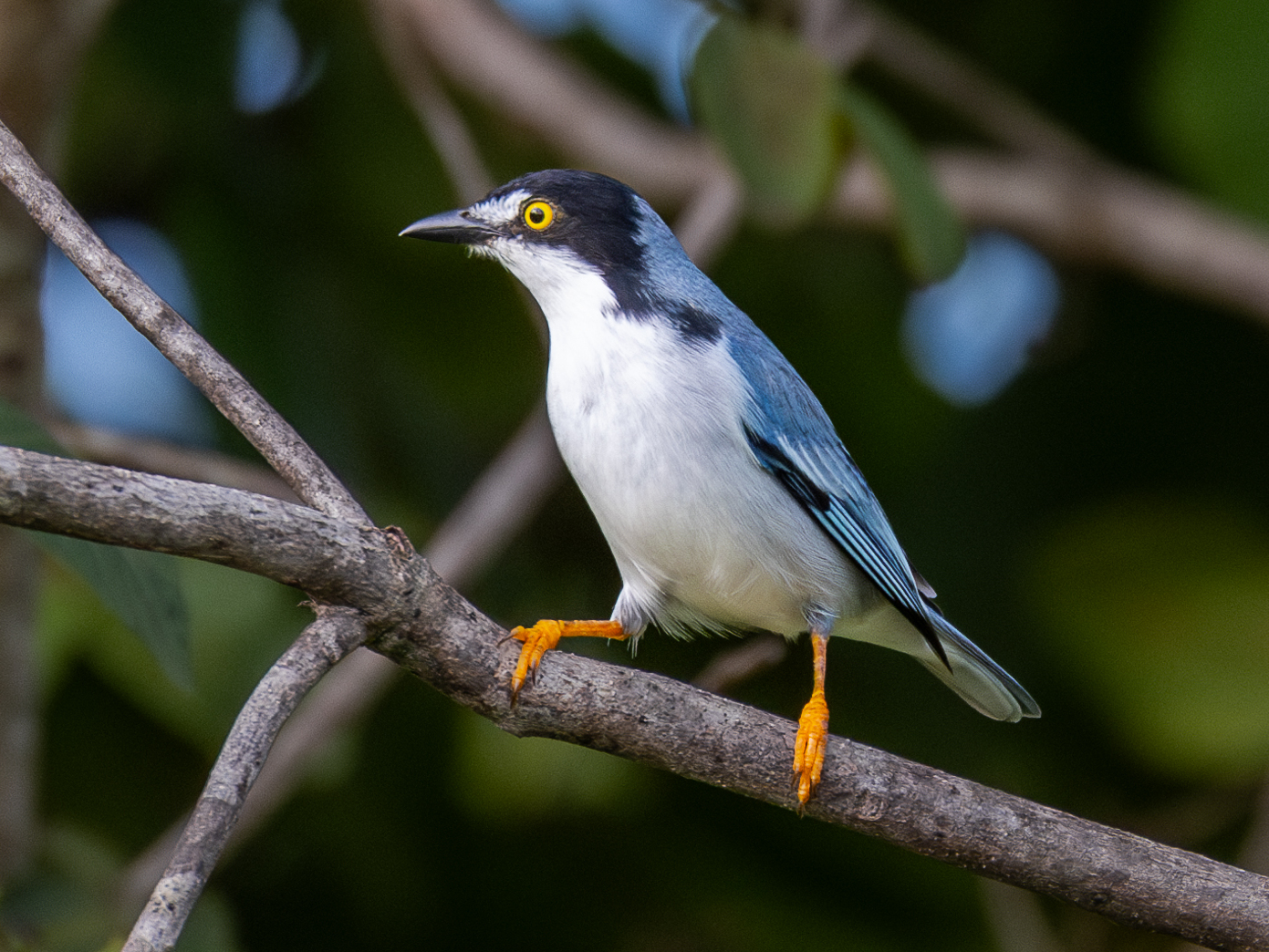
Hooded tanager

Order: Passeriformes Family: Thraupidae

- Red-cowled cardinal (Paroaria dominicana) (EB)
- Black-faced tanager (Schistochlamys melanopis)
- Cinnamon tanager (Schistochlamys ruficapillus)
- Magpie tanager (Cissopis leverianus)
- Scarlet-throated tanager (Compsothraupis loricata) (EB)
- Hooded tanager (Nemosia pileata)
- Orange-headed tanager (Thlypopsis sordida)
- Flame-crested tanager (Loriotus cristatus)
- White-lined tanager (Tachyphonus rufus)
- Brazilian tanager (Ramphocelus bresilius) (EB)
- Fawn-breasted tanager (Pipraeidea melanonota)
- Sayaca tanager (Thraupis sayaca)
- Palm tanager (Thraupis palmarum)
- Burnished-buff tanager (Stilpnia cayana)
- White-bellied tanager (Tangara brasiliensis) (A)(EB)
- Opal-rumped tanager (Tangara velia)
- Seven-coloured tanager (Tangara fastuosa) (EB)
- Red-necked tanager (Tangara cyanocephala) (EB)
- Swallow tanager (Tersina viridis)
- Blue dacnis (Dacnis cayana)
- Red-legged honeycreeper (Cyanerpes cyaneus)
- Green honeycreeper (Chlorophanes spiza)
- Guira tanager (Hemithraupis guira)
- Yellow-backed tanager (Hemithraupis flavicollis)
- Bicolored conebill (Conirostrum bicolor)
- Chestnut-vented conebill (Conirostrum speciosum)
- Orange-fronted yellow-finch (Sicalis columbiana)
- Saffron finch (Sicalis flaveola)
- Grassland yellow-finch (Sicalis luteola)
- Wedge-tailed grass-finch (Emberizoides herbicola)
- Blue-black grassquit (Volatinia jacarina)
- Lined seedeater (Sporophila lineola)
- White-bellied seedeater (Sporophila leucoptera)
- Copper seedeater (Sporophila bouvreuil)
- Chestnut-bellied seed-finch (Sporophila angolensis)
- Yellow-bellied seedeater (Sporophila nigricollis)
- Double-collared seedeater (Sporophila caerulescens)
- White-throated seedeater (Sporophila albogularis) (EB)
- Pileated finch (Coryphospingus pileatus)
- Bananaquit (Coereba flaveola)
- Sooty grassquit (Asemospiza fuliginosa)
- Black-throated saltator (Saltatricula atricollis)
- Buff-throated saltator (Saltator maximus)
- Bluish-grey saltator (Saltator coerulescens)
- Green-winged saltator (Saltator similis)
- Black-throated grosbeak (Saltator fuliginosus)
