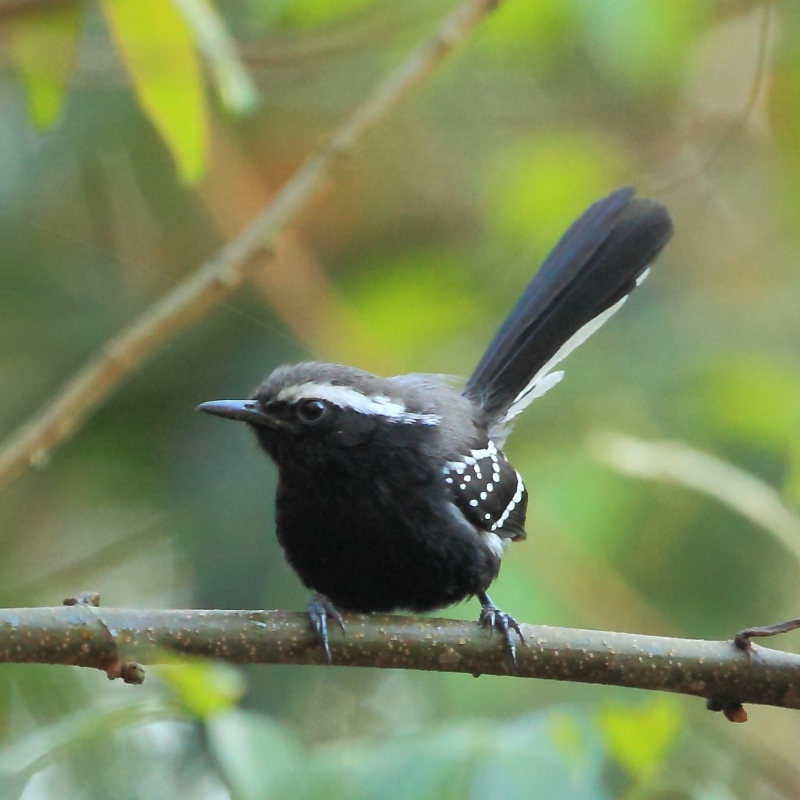
- Male at Dourado, São Paulo state, Brazil
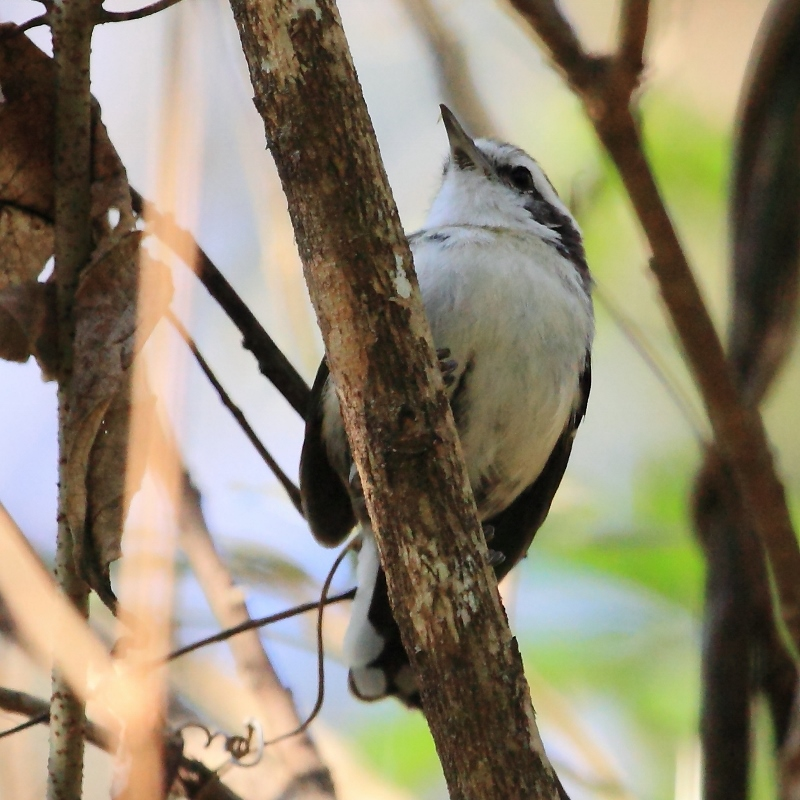
- Female at Dourado, São Paulo state, Brazil

Conservation status
- Least Concern (IUCN 3.1)

Scientific classification
- Kingdom: Animalia
- Phylum: Chordata
- Class: Aves
- Order: Passeriformes
- Family: Thamnophilidae
- Genus: Formicivora
- Species: F. melanogaster

Binomial name
- Formicivora melanogaster Pelzeln, 1868

= Black-bellied antwren =

Species of bird

The black-bellied antwren (Formicivora melanogaster) is a species of bird in subfamily Thamnophilinae of family Thamnophilidae, the "typical antbirds". It is found in Bolivia, Brazil, and Paraguay.

== Taxonomy and systematics ==
The black-bellied antwren was described by the Austrian ornithologist August von Pelzeln in 1868 and given its current binomial name Formicivora melanogaster. It and the serra antwren (F. serrana) are sister species. The black-bellied Antwren has two subspecies, the nominate F. m. melanogaster (Pelzeln, 1868) and F. m. bahiae (Hellmayr, 1909).

== Description ==
The black-bellied antwren is 12 to 14 cm (4.7 to 5.5 in) long. Adult males of the nominate subspecies have a wide white supercilium that extends down the neck, along the side of the breast, and widens on the flanks. Their crown and upperparts are dark grayish brown with white edges on the outer scapulars and a hidden white patch between them. Their wings are blackish with white tips on the coverts. Their tail is black with white feather tips that increase in size from the central to the outer feathers. Their face, throat, and underparts are black with white underwing coverts. Adult females have a browner crown and back than males with little or no white between the scapulars. They have a wide black band through the eye, a white throat, and white underparts with a faint buff tinge. Males of subspecies F. m. bahiae have a wider white line between the supercilium and the breast, paler upperparts, and smaller white spots on the tail than the nominate. Females are the same as the nominate.

== Distribution and habitat ==
The nominate subspecies of the black-bellied antwren is the more southerly of the two and has a wider distribution. It is found in central Brazil from southern Bahia, northern Minas Gerais, and western São Paulo states west through far northern Paraguay into southeastern Bolivia's departments of Santa Cruz, Chuquisaca, and Tarija. Subspecies F. m. bahiae is found in northeastern Brazil in an area roughly bounded by extreme eastern Maranhão, Rio Grande do Norte, and northern Bahia.

The black-bellied antwren inhabits the understorey to mid-storey of tropical deciduous forest, gallery forest, caatinga scrublands, and the ecotone between caatinga and cerrado. It also occurs in mata-de-cipó, a biome characterized by a relatively open understorey and a few large emergent trees above a dense mid-storey.

== Behavior ==
=== Movement ===
The black-bellied antwren is believed to be a year-round resident throughout its range.

=== Feeding ===
The black-bellied antwren's diet has not been detailed but is known to include insects and spiders. It typically forage singly, in pairs, or in family groups, and sometimes as part of a mixed-species feeding flock. It usually forages from the ground to about 3 m (10 ft) above it, but has been observed feeding as high as 6 m (20 ft) above it in Minas Gerais. It forages actively in dense shrubs and vine tangles, taking most prey by gleaning while perched from live leaves, vines, branches, and stems. It sometimes makes short jumps or brief sallies from a perch to reach the underside of leaves. In areas of mata-de-cipó it does much foraging in terrestrial bromeliads. It has not been observed following army ant swarms.

=== Breeding ===
The black-bellied antwren's nesting season is known to include January. Its nest is an open cup of plant material lined with fine grass fibers and secured with spiderweb in the fork of a branch. The only well-studied nest had two nestlings that were being fed by both parents. The incubation period, time to fledging, and other details of parental care are not known.

=== Vocalization ===
The black-bellied antwren's song is a "slow series of high, nasal 'tjew' notes (2/sec over 8 sec)". Its calls may vary geographically and include "a short series of complaining squeals...also sharp high-pitched 'seek' notes and lower-pitched, short downslurred notes".

== Status ==
The IUCN has assessed the black-bellied antwren as being of Least Concern. It has a large range. Its population size is not known and is believed to be decreasing. No immediate threats have been identified. It is considered fairly common in most of its range. Few areas within its range are formally protected. "The dry forests, caatinga scrub and mata-de-cipó woodlands favoured by this species are being rapidly cleared for cattle pastures and coffee plantations; even where such habitats not being cleared, they are heavily exploited by local people for firewood and fence-post production, with grazing by cattle and goats preventing regeneration of most of the woody plants."
