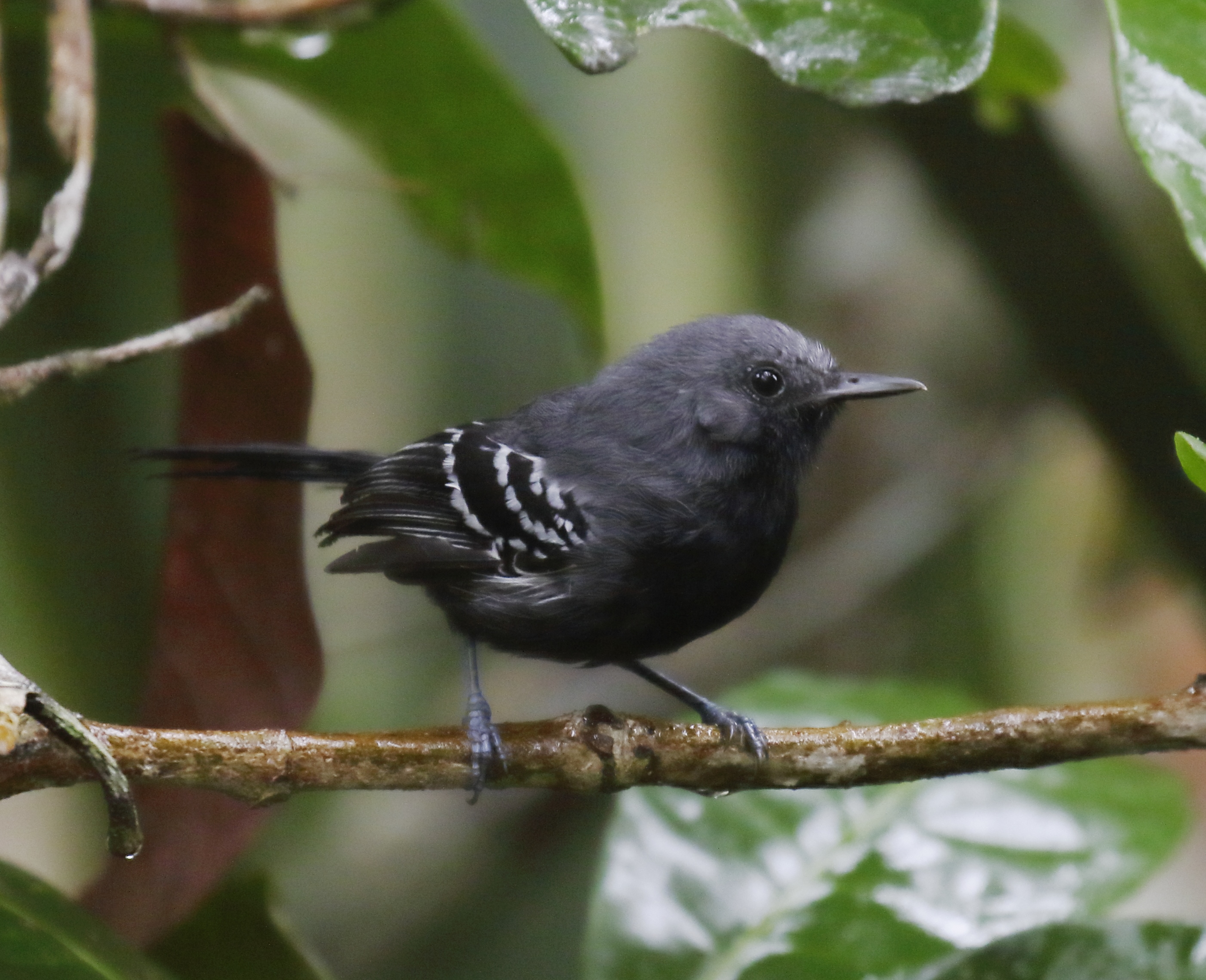
- Male at Boa Nova, Bahia State, Brazil

Conservation status
- Least Concern (IUCN 3.1)]

Scientific classification
- Kingdom: Animalia
- Phylum: Chordata
- Class: Aves
- Order: Passeriformes
- Family: Thamnophilidae
- Genus: Formicivora
- Species: F. iheringi

Binomial name
- Formicivora iheringi Hellmayr, 1909

Synonyms
- Neorhopias iheringi

= Narrow-billed antwren =

Species of bird in Brazil

The narrow-billed antwren (Formicivora iheringi) is a species of bird in subfamily Thamnophilinae of family Thamnophilidae, the "typical antbirds". It is endemic to eastern Brazil.

== Taxonomy and systematics ==
The narrow-billed antwren is monotypic.

The narrow-billed antwren is not closely related to other members of genus Formicivora. In the early twentieth century some authors placed it in the monotypic genus Neorhopias. More recent studies have revived that suggestion.

== Description ==
The narrow-billed antwren is 11 to 12 cm (4.3 to 4.7 in) long; one male weighed 8.2 g (0.29 oz). The species is sexually dimorphic and has a longish bill and tail. Adult males are mostly dark gray. Their wings and tail are a darker blackish gray, with white tips on the wing coverts and the outer tail feathers. The center of their throat and breast are black, their flanks white, and their undertail coverts have white bars. Adult females have a pale supercilium and a whitish eye ring. They have olive-brown upperparts with a grayer crown; the olive-brown becomes reddish yellow-brown on the uppertail coverts. Their wings are brown with pale cinnamon edges on the coverts and reddish edges on the flight feathers. Their tail is reddish brown. Their underparts are mostly yellow-ochre that is nearly whitish in the center of the belly; their flanks have some white.

== Distribution and habitat ==
The narrow-billed antwren has a disjunct distribution inland from the coast in the eastern Brazilian states of Bahia and Minas Gerais. It inhabits the understorey to mid-storey of deciduous forest. In part of Bahia it also occurs in mata-de-cipó, a biome characterized by a relatively open understorey and a few large emergent trees above a dense mid-storey. In elevation it ranges between 250 and 1,100 m (800 and 3,600 ft).

== Behavior ==
=== Movement ===
The narrow-billed antwren is believed to be a year-round resident throughout its range.

=== Feeding ===
The diet of the narrow-billed antwren is not known in detail but includes insects and probably spiders. It typically forages singly, in pairs, or in family groups, and sometimes as part of a mixed-species feeding flock. It usually forages between about 1.5 and 8 m (5 and 26 ft) of the ground but occasionally on the ground and as high as 12 m (39 ft). It forages actively but methodically, picking at stems and limbs in woody vine tangles and on somewhat open branches while hitching along them. It also takes prey by gleaning from live leaves, clusters of dead leaves, and clumps of moss while perched, and sometimes makes short sallies from a perch to capture moths in flight.

=== Breeding ===
The narrow-billed antwren's breeding season has not been defined but appears to include October to December, the local wet season. Nothing else is known about its breeding biology.

=== Vocalization ===
The narrow-billed antwren's song is a "series of very high, loud 'tiúw' notes (2/sec over 8 sec)". Its calls "include abrupt notes, often in pairs or triplets, and [a] short rattle".

== Status ==
The IUCN originally in 1988 assessed the narrow-billed antwren as Threatened, then in 1994 as Vulnerable, in 2004 as Near Threatened, and since 2023 as being of Least Concern. It has a large overall range but occurs only in pockets within it. Its population size is not known and is believed to be decreasing. "Its habitats are being cleared for cattle pasture in central-south Bahia, and much of the forest in north-east Minas Gerais and adjacent south Bahia has been cleared for coffee plantations...[h]owever, the species seems to be able to cope with forest fragmentation, persisting in small areas." It is considered uncommon to fairly common. It does not occur in any protected areas, but "substantial habitat harbouring viable populations of this species still exists in Jequié-Boa Nova region (Bahia) and at Almenara in Jequitinonha Valley (Minas Gerais), although neither area is formally protected".
