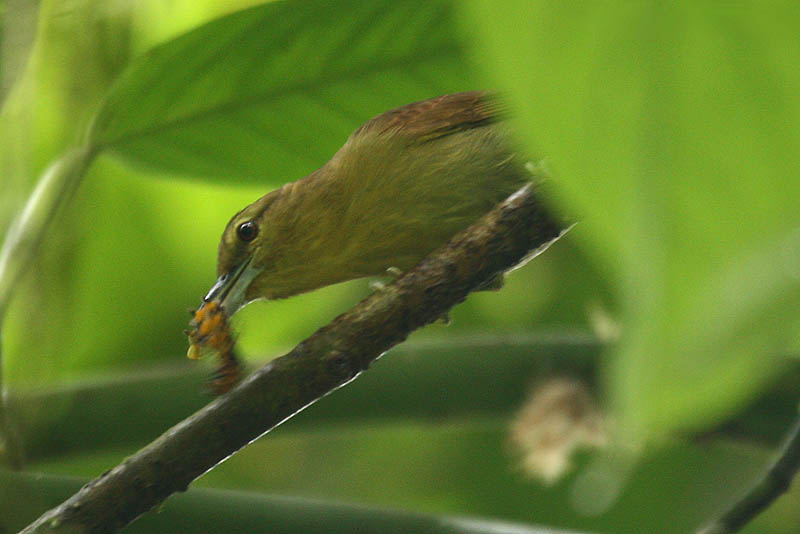
- Thamnistes

Scientific classification
- Kingdom: Animalia
- Phylum: Chordata
- Class: Aves
- Order: Passeriformes
- Infraorder: Tyrannides
- Parvorder: Furnariida
- Family: Thamnophilidae
- Genus: Thamnistes

= Thamnistes =

Genus of birds

Thamnistes is a genus of antbirds in the family Thamnophilidae. It is primarily found in lowland and foothill forests from Central America to the northern and eastern Andes. Members of this genus show typical antbird foraging behavior— following army ants. Thamnistes is also known for their distinctive vocalisations. That stable and innate vocalisation plays a key role in its species identification. Recent phylogenetic researches have revealed complex evolutionary relationships and raised questions about species classification. Current research and field observations continue to refine the understanding of its evolution, behavior and distribution. Two species of this genus are currently recognized: Thamnistes anabatinus and Thamnistes rufescens, with several subspecies under T. anabatinus. Although not currently considered threatened, both species are subject to ongoing monitoring due to habitat specialization and gradual population declines.

== Taxonomy ==
=== Classification ===
Thamnistes belong to the family Thamnophilidae. It is a small group of antbirds that live in the Neotropics. According to the Animal Diversity Web (University of Michigan Museum of Zoology), its taxonomic hierarchy is as follows:

- Kingdom: Animalia
- Phylum: Chordata
- Subphylum: Vertebrata
- Class: Aves
- Order: Passeriformes
- Family: Thamnophilidae
- Genus: Thamnistes

This taxonomic hierarchy ranges from the broad kingdom level to the specific genus level. It reflects the phylogenetic position of Thamnistes in the avian evolutionary tree. As a suboscine passerine, the vocalizations of Thamnistes are usually genetically determined rather than learned.

Thamnistes belongs to the infraorder Furnari, a group that includes birds mostly living in forests and feeding on insects. Thamnophilidae is a major family within this group. It is well known for its complex social behavior and specialized foraging strategies, such as following army ants.

This classification structure shows the ecological adaptations and position of Thamnistes in tropical regions. It provides a basis for further study of its morphology, behavior and evolutionary history.

=== Controversies and changes ===
In recent years, the classification of Thamnistes has been debated extensively in academic researches. Traditional methods relied on external features such as bill shape and foot structure to determine evolutionary relationships. However, these features are unreliable in many cases. Some species have been incorrectly classified as closely related. Because they independently developed similar traits in response to similar environmental pressures.

Recent phylogenetic studies have questioned the monophyly of several genera in the family Thamnophilidae. Moyle et al. (2009) suggested that many traditional classifications, such as Myrmotherula and Myrmeciza, are not monophyletic. They may be polyphyletic and need to be reclassified. Meanwhile, Irestedt et al. (2004) used Bayesian inference and molecular markers in their study of the phylogeny of typical antbirds, including Thamnistes. Their findings further revealed the complex and not fully resolved relationships among multiple genera within the family.

Researchers identified that Thamnistes exhibits complex phylogenetic relationships and a long evolutionary history. Relationships between evolutionary clades represented by some genera are still unclear, such as Formicivora. This uncertainty suggests that Thamnistes may undergone rapid adaptation to different environments, making it harder to trace its evolutionary history. In these circumstances, more genetic data and higher-resolution molecular markers are needed. With continued advancements in molecular techniques, acoustic analysis, and ecological research tools, future studies are expected to provide a clearer understanding of species boundaries and phylogenetic placement for Thamnistes. These improvements may also help clarify evolutionary relationships and could lead to further taxonomic revisions and species redefinitions.

Additionally, recent works on the classification of Thamnistes have raised further discussion regarding species boundaries. Proposal 758 of the South American Classification Committee (SACC) suggested that rufescens, which is currently considered a subspecies of Thamnistes anabatinus, should be treated as a separate species named Thamnistes rufescens. This proposal was based primarily on significant differences in vocalizations and plumage. Researchers found that the song structure of rufescens differs markedly from other subspecies, particularly in several acoustic features of the slow song. Its plumage also shows clear and consistent differences—for example, a back with faint striping and a more reddish-brown belly. These features distinguish it from other geographic populations. Although recordings of this subspecies are currently limited, the available data suggest that its vocal traits may hold diagnostic value at the species level. As more acoustic and genetic data become available, the species boundaries of Thamnistes will be further clarified.

== Species ==
=== Recognized species in genus Thamnistes ===
Thamnistes species list
Image	Scientific name	English name	Authority
	Thamnistes anabatinus	Russet Antshrike	Sclater, PL & Salvin, 1860
	Thamnistes rufescens	Rufescent Antshrike	Cabanis, 1873

=== Subspecies of Thamnistes anabatinus ===
Subspecies of T. anabatinus
Scientific name	Authority
T. a. saturatus	Ridgway, 1908
T. a. anabatinus	Sclater, PL & Salvin, 1860
T. a. aequatorialis	Sclater, PL, 1862
T. a. coronatus	Nelson, 1912
T. a. intermedius	Chapman, 1914
T. a. gularis	Phelps, WH & Phelps, WH Jr, 1956

== Distribution and habitat ==
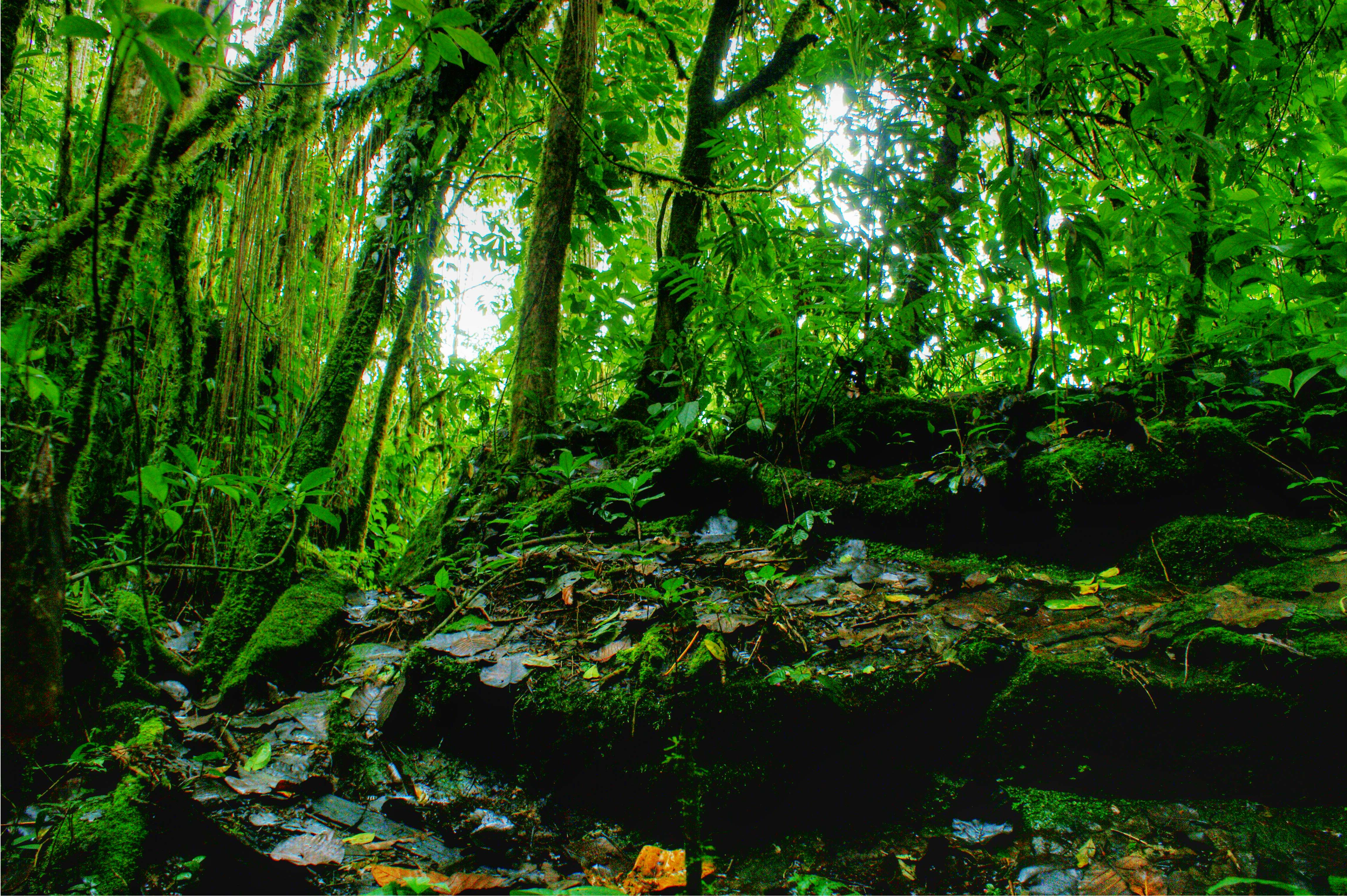
Tropical forest landscape in Reserva Skutch, Costa Rica; this region forms part of the natural habitat of Thamnistes

Thamnistes is mainly found in foothill forests from Central America to the northern Andes, with a particular concentration in low to medium altitude forests with moist, well-developed canopies. Its range also includes nearby lowlands and is especially common in sloping ecosystems on the Pacific side. These areas are mostly tropical or subtropical forest environments rich in biodiversity and complex vegetation structure. They provide rich food sources and breeding conditions for this genus.

While Thamnistes as a genus occupies a broad tropical range, its two currently recognized species—Thamnistes anabatinus and Thamnistes aequatorialis—show some differences in their geographic distributions and ecological preferences.

IUCN Animal Threat Category List

Thamnistes anabatinus is widely distributed across Central America and parts of northwestern South America. Its range extends from southern Mexico, including the states of Oaxaca and Chiapas, through Guatemala, Belize, Honduras, Nicaragua, Costa Rica, and Panama. In South America, it is found in the western montane regions of Colombia and Ecuador. It is especially common in humid forest environments at elevations between 0 and 400 metres above sea level. These forests are species-rich ecosystems with distinctive vegetation, suitable for foraging and breeding. The Extent of Occurrence (EOO) of T. anabatinus is approximately 2,340,000 square kilometres. According to the IUCN assessment criteria, this value falls far short of the geographic range threshold for the 'Vulnerable' category. Therefore, it is classified as Least Concern on the IUCN Red List. Its generation length is approximately 3.2 years.

Because of ongoing classification uncertainties within the genus, there is currently no precise global population estimate. However, the overall population is declining slowly but steadily. According to BirdLife International, populations of T. anabatinus are projected to fall by approximately 10% to 19% over the ten-year period from 2016 to 2026.

Thamnistes aequatorialis is mainly found in the eastern Andes of South America, including Colombia, Ecuador, Peru, Bolivia, and Venezuela. It inhabits subtropical and tropical humid lowland forests from 0 to 1,700 metres above sea level. It is usually active in the middle and upper strata of the forest. This species is a non-migratory bird and inhabits its range throughout the year. According to BirdLife International, its 'Extent of Occurrence (EOO)' is approximately 1,950,000 square kilometres. Although this range is slightly smaller than the 2,340,000 square kilometres of its close relative Thamnistes anabatinus. It still falls far short of the geographic range thresholds for the "Vulnerable" category in the IUCN assessment. As a result, the species is rated Least Concern on the IUCN Red List. Its Generation Length is approximately 3.0 years. Its global population shows a continuous downward trend. Compared with T. anabatinus, T. aequatorialis has a slightly smaller range and lower altitudinal ceiling. However, both species have similar ecological habits and conservation status. They are dependent on moist forest environments and are not currently listed as threatened.

== Behaviour ==
=== Feeding ===
The feeding behavior of Thamnistes reflects typical antbird traits and involves strong interactions with other animals in the ecosystem. Its primary feeding strategy is known as "army-ant following". This strategy can be categorized into three types of followers: occasional followers, regular followers, and obligate followers. Although this strategy is considered to have ancient evolutionary origins, its specific evolutionary pathways are still remain unclear. Current study suggests that the behaviour evolved through a gradual increase in dependence. No reversal has been detected over the long evolutionary period. Such irreversible evolutionary pathway is uncommon among animals and is of particular interest in evolutionary biology.

This feeding behaviour of Thamnistes reflects the common ecological adaptive characteristics of the family Thamnophilidae. Like many other antbirds, Thamnistes preys on arthropods and small vertebrates that are flushed from the forest floor by army ants such as Eciton burchellii.

Brumfield et al. (2007) classified the ant-following behaviour of antbirds into three types: occasional followers, regular followers, and obligate followers. Thamnistes is classified as a regular follower—it takes full advantage of foraging opportunities when encountering an army ant but does not depend on it for daily survival. One of the main advantages of this behaviour is that it helps birds find more food by following army-ant swarms. These swarms flush out a variety of prey, including insects and other small invertebrates. The following Thamnistes capture the exposed prey. This flexible behavioral strategy allows individuals to make use of ant-driven feeding opportunities when available, while still being able to forage on their own when army ants are not present. Moreover, this ant-following behavior may also affect how the ant swarms move, suggesting a two-way interaction between the birds and the ants.

Their study concluded that army-ant-following to be a phylogenetically conserved foraging behavior with a long evolutionary history. Its evolutionary pathway is characterized by a gradual progression from occasional to obligate following. Brumfield et al. (2007) found that this behavior evolved in a consistent sequence across multiple antbird lineages. It begins with occasional following, advancing to regular following, and eventually developing into obligate dependence. Brumfield et al. (2007) specifically noted: "We did not observe evolutionary reversals from the most specialized obligate state," indicating that reversals from high to lower levels of dependence were not detected in their phylogenetic reconstruction. This kind of irreversible evolutionary pattern is relatively rare in behavioral studies and suggests that once established. It tends to remain stable within specific lineages. Although the study documented one exception—a case in which Myrmeciza melanoceps may have shifted from regular to occasional following—this was treated as an isolated instance that does not alter the overall conclusion that ant-following behavior tends toward evolutionary stabilization.

In addition to the phylogenetic pathways, this study also integrated geographic distribution data. It found a strong relationship between ant-following strategies and local competitive pressures. For example, regular followers are more likely to evolve in regions with fewer obligate followers. In areas such as western Amazonia, obligate followers are more abundant and diverse, whereas regular followers such as Thamnistes are typically found in areas with lower colony densities and reduced competition—such as the forests of the Brazilian Atlantic coast and west of the Andes.

Furthermore, in ecosystems with a high abundance of army ants and greater species competition, there is increased evolutionary pressure toward obligate dependence. In contrast, environments with lower competitive intensity continue to provide ecological space for regular and occasional followers. This behavioural hierarchy is also observed spatially: larger birds typically dominate the front edge of a moving army-ant colony. While smaller and medium-sized birds, such as Thamnistes, are more often found feeding along the middle or rear sections.

Overall, Thamnistes, as a representative of regular followers, demonstrates a middle stage in the evolution of foraging strategies among antbirds. Its behavioural stability, ecological flexibility, and phylogenetic position make it a valuable model for understanding the behavioural ecology of tropical forest bird communities.

=== Vocalization ===
The vocalizations of Thamnistes play an important role in taxonomic classification and exhibit distinctive features within the family Thamnophilidae. According to Isler and Whitney (2017), vocalizations plays a key role in identifying species in this group. Since suboscine birds do not learn their songs, their vocalizations are instinctive and remain stable over time. This stability makes vocalizations useful for distinguishing species.

In their study, the vocalizations of Thamnistes were classified into two main categories: songs and calls. Songs were further subdivided into slow songs and fast songs based on rhythmic tempo. Calls were categorized as basic calls, abrupt calls, and other calls according to syllable structure and behavioural context.

Slow songs were recorded in all studied populations and were relatively simple and repetitive in structure. In contrast, fast songs were only found in two populations—aequatorialis and rufescens—and were characterized by a greater number of syllables and a faster tempo. Although the fast and slow songs shared a basic structure, they showed consistent and distinguishable differences in rhythm and acoustic parameters, and are therefore considered separate song types.

Among slow songs, all populations except rufescens demonstrated similar structures. It typically begins with a flat, low-pitched introductory note, and followed by descending elements with minimal variation between syllables. In contrast, the slow songs of rufescens showed significant differences, including a faster tempo, higher frequency peaks, and a gradual upward trend in syllable frequency. These distinctions further support its treatment as a separate taxonomic unit.

For fast songs, rufescens also displayed markedly different characteristics compared to aequatorialis. Its fast song not only had more syllables and a quicker tempo, but often included one to three highly distinctive "slipping" introductory notes—a structural feature not observed in other antbirds. This unique acoustic pattern provides a diagnostic feature for rufescens. Moreover, recordings of the same individual showed that slow and fast songs can occur in sequence within a single vocalization event. This phenomenon may provide new insights into song function and mechanisms of individual recognition.

Basic calls were found in most populations, with the exception of rufescens. These typically consist of one to three syllables. The three-syllable form includes a rising note, a lower inverted V-shaped note, and a high-pitched terminal syllable with a dipping frequency. Some individuals produce only partial versions of this call. In contrast, data on the calls of rufescens are limited, with only two high-pitched sliding syllables recorded; these may have diagnostic significance for species identification.

Another type, the abrupt call, was recorded in some populations and consists of a sharp, inverted V-shaped syllable. This call is short in duration, has a high peak frequency. However, due to limited recordings, inter-population variation could not be assessed. Additionally, several other unclassified call types were noted, but not analyzed further because of insufficient data.

In addition, the study of Isler and Whitney (2017) also assessed vocal variation across geographic populations by analyzing spectrograms and evaluating twelve acoustic parameters. These included note count, tempo, frequency, duration and variation of both notes and intervals. These acoustic features provide a basis for comparing populations from different regions and are often used to identify possible sound differences between species. The findings offer quantitative evidence of structural differences in vocalizations within the genus Thamnistes and serve as a useful reference for species delimitation.

This study also concluded that these vocal differences were consistent across populations and were statistically significant. Vocalizations in Thamnistes are considered an important mechanism of reproductive isolation. Such differences may play a role in mate recognition or territorial behavior, potentially contributing to the maintenance of population separation. These results provide further support for understanding evolutionary relationships and species boundaries within the genus, They are particularly helpful in groups where morphological differentiation is limited.
