= Boa Nova Wildlife Refuge =

Wildlife reserve in Bahia, Brazil

- Refúgio de Vida Silvestre de Boa Nova
- Location within Brazil
- Nearest city: Boa Nova, Bahia
- Coordinates: 14.367972°S 40.170113°W
- Area: 15,024 hectares (37,130 acres)
- Designation: Wildlife reserve
- Created: 11 June 2010
- Administrator: Chico Mendes Institute for Biodiversity Conservation

The Boa Nova Wildlife Refuge (Portuguese: Refúgio de Vida Silvestre de Boa Nova) is a wildlife reserve in the state of Bahia, Brazil.

== Location ==
The Boa Nova Wildlife Refuge is in the municipality of Boa Nova, Bahia. It has an area of 15,024 hectares (37,130 acres). It adjoins segments of the Boa Nova National Park. The purpose is to fully protect and regenerate the natural ecosystems in the transition between Atlantic Forest and Caatinga, to maintain viable populations of endangered mammals and species of birds, particularly the slender antbird (Rhopornis ardesiacus), to maintain and restore waterways and watersheds, and to enable scientific research, education, environmental interpretation, recreation in contact with nature and ecotourism.

== History ==
A public consultation on creating a national park and wildlife refuge in the south of Boa Nova was arranged by the Brazilian Institute of Environment and Renewable Natural Resources (IBAMA) on 14 December 2006. The Boa Nova Wildlife Refuge was created by federal decree on 11 June 2010, which also created the Boa Nova National Park with an area of about 12,065 hectares (29,810 acres). It became part of the Central Atlantic Forest Ecological Corridor, created in 2002. The consultative council for the reserve was created on 27 August 2015.

== Sources ==
- RVS de Boa Nova (RVS) (in Portuguese), ISA: Instituto Socioambiental
- Lamas, Ivana Reis; Crepaldi, Maria Otávia; Mesquita, Carlos Alberto Bernardo (2015), Uma Rede no Corredor (PDF) (in Portuguese), Conservação Internacional (CI-Brasil), ISBN 978-85-98830-28-5
