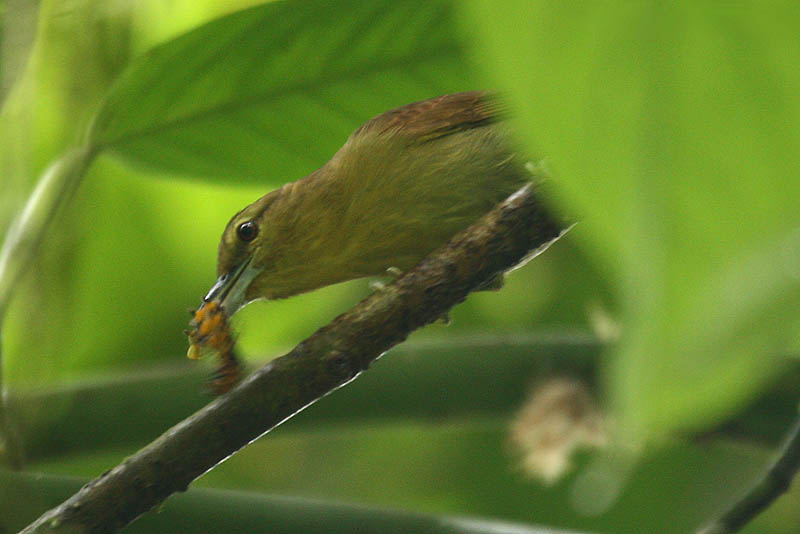

Conservation status
- Least Concern (IUCN 3.1)

- Least Concern (IUCN 3.1)

Scientific classification
- Kingdom: Animalia
- Phylum: Chordata
- Class: Aves
- Order: Passeriformes
- Family: Thamnophilidae
- Genus: Thamnistes
- Species: T. anabatinus

Binomial name
- Thamnistes anabatinus Sclater, PL & Salvin, 1860
- Range of "western" russet antshrike (see Taxonomy and Distribution sections)

= Russet antshrike =

Species of bird

The russet antshrike (Thamnistes anabatinus) is a passerine bird in subfamily Myrmornithinae of family Thamnophilidae, the "typical antbirds". It is found in Mexico, every Central American country except El Salvador, Colombia, Ecuador, Venezuela, and possibly Peru.

== Taxonomy and systematics ==
The russet antshrike was described by the English ornithologists Philip Sclater and Osbert Salvin in 1860. They erected the genus Thamnistes to accommodate the species and coined the binomial name Thamnistes anabatinus. The specific epithet is from the Ancient Greek anabatēs meaning "climber" or "mounter".

The taxonomy of the russet antshrike is unsettled. The International Ornithological Committee (IOC) and the Clements taxonomy assign it these six subspecies:

- T. a. anabatinus Sclater, PL & Salvin, 1860
- T. a. saturatus Ridgway, 1908
- T. a. coronatus Nelson, 1912
- T. a. intermedius Chapman, 1914
- T. a. gularis Phelps, WH & Phelps, WH Jr, 1956
- T. a. aequatorialis Sclater, PL, 1862

However, BirdLife International's Handbook of the Birds of the World (HBW) treats T. a. gularis and T. a. aequatorialis as the "eastern russet antshrike" (T. aequatorialis) and the other four subspecies as the "western russet antshrike" (T. anabatinus). In addition, it includes T. a. rufescens as a third subspecies of the "eastern" species; since 2018 IOC and Clements have treated it as a separate species, the rufescent antshrike (T. rufescens). Clements does group T. a. gularis and T. a. aequatorialis as the "russet antshrike (Andean)" and the other four subspecies as the "russet antshrike (tawny)" within the single species.

This article follows the six-subspecies model.

== Description ==
The russet antshrike is 13 to 15 cm (5.1 to 5.9 in) long and weighs about 19 to 24 g (0.67 to 0.85 oz). The species has a rather stocky body and a heavy bill with a hooked tip. The sexes have almost identical plumage. Adults of the nominate subspecies T. a. anabatinus have an olive-yellow supercilium, a dusky line through the eye, and pale olive-brown ear coverts. Their forehead, crown, and upperparts are olive-brown. Their tail is rufous and their wings cinnamon-rufous. Their throat, breast, and belly are pale yellowish olive and their flanks and undertail coverts olive. Males have a patch of cinnamon or orange-rufous between their shoulders that is very hard to see in the field; females lack it. In both sexes their iris is red-brown to brown, their bill dark gray to blackish or dark brown, and their legs and feet blue-gray to pale gray.

Subspecies T. a. saturatus is slightly darker than the nominate. Its iris is red-brown, its maxilla greenish black, its mandible horn, and its legs and feet greenish slate. T. a. coronatus has a rufescent crown and yellower underparts than the nominate. Its iris is red or auburn, its maxilla slate or gray with some fuscous-black, its mandible bluish gray or light gray, and its legs and feet light green to gray.T. a. intermedius is slightly darker than coronatus and the male's shoulder patch has some blackish spots. T. a. gularis has a more ochre throat than the nominate. T. a. aequatorialis has a very dark olive-brown crown, olive-brown upperparts, an olive-yellow throat, and olive underparts. Its shoulder patch is orange-rufous with black spots.

== Distribution and habitat ==
The subspecies of the russet antshrike are found thus:

- T. a. anabatinus: on the Caribbean slope from Chiapas, Tabasco, and Oaxaca in Mexico south through northern Guatemala and southern Belize into northern Honduras
- T. a. saturatus: Caribbean slope of Nicaragua, Caribbean and Pacific slopes of Costa Rica (except the far northwest), and slightly into western Panama's Chiriquí Province
- T. a. coronatus: from central Panama to and possibly into northwestern Colombia
- T. a. intermedius: Pacific slope of Colombia's Western Andes south from Antioquia Department and the western slope of the Andes in Ecuador south almost to Peru
- T. a. gularis: Venezuela's Táchira state and possibly adjacent northeastern Colombia
- T. a. aequatorialis: eastern slope of Colombia's Eastern Andes from Meta Department south through eastern Ecuador just into far northern Peru's Amazonas Department (However, the South American Classification Committee of the American Ornithological Society does not recognize any records in Peru.)

In much of its range the russet antshrike inhabits evergreen forest both lowland and montane and adjacent secondary forest. In northern Central America it also occurs in semideciduous forest. It usually remains in the forest subcanopy and canopy. In elevation it ranges from near sea level to about 1,300 m (4,300 ft) in northern Central America and to 1,500 m (4,900 ft) in Costa Rica. In Colombia it reaches 1,500 m (4,900 ft). In Ecuador it mostly occurs between 400 and 1,300 m (1,300 and 4,300 ft) though in the far northwest it is found lower. It Venezuela it occurs at around 1,250 m (4,100 ft).

== Behavior ==
=== Movement ===
The russet antshrike is a year-round resident throughout its range.

=== Feeding ===
The russet antshrike feeds mostly on arthropods and has also been seen eating fruit. It forages singly or in pairs and almost always as part of a mixed-species feeding flock. It forages almost entirely in the forest's subcanopy and canopy, flying from tree to tree and there energetically hopping along trunks, branches, and vines. It gleans prey from foliage both live and dead, stems, vines, and clusters of moss. It has been observed attending an army ant swarm, descending to near the ground to capture prey fleeing the ants.

=== Breeding ===
The russet antshrike's breeding season has not been fully documented. It appears to vary geographically and generally include March to July. Only one nest, in Costa Rica, has been described in detail. It was a deep pouch of dead leaves held together by rootlets and fungal rhizomorphs hanging from a fork of slender branches and partially hidden by living foliage. It was about 15 m (50 ft) above the ground. Both sexes built the nest, incubated the eggs, and provisioned the nestlings. The incubation period was estimated at 15 to 18 days. The number of nestlings could not be determined because the nest failed before fledging. Another nest, also in Costa Rica, contained two eggs but was not otherwise detailed.

=== Vocalization ===
The russet antshrike is not highly vocal. All of the subspecies give a "slow song" described as ""a short, countable series (e.g., six notes, two seconds) of abrupt downslurred notes that fall in pitch, preceded by abrupt lower-pitched softer note, e.g., 'tsip-i-tssip' or 'tseep-it-seet' ". Subspecies T. a. aequatorialis also gives a "rapid song", a "loud and penetrating 'teeeu, tseu!-tseu!-tseu!-tseu!' ". The species' calls are "one-note, two-note, and three-note variations of a basic call". Descriptions include "a high, thin, slightly sibilant tssip-i-tssip or tseep-it-seet", "a thin sweet tsweetsip", and "a much thinner and more sibilant [than the song] wee-tsip".

== Status ==
The IUCN follows HBW taxonomy and so has separately assessed the "western" and "eastern" russet antshrikes; it also includes the rufescent antshrike within the "eastern" assessement. Both taxa are of Least Concern. Both have large ranges. Their population sizes are not known and believed to be decreasing. No immediate threat to either has been identified. The russet antshrike is overall considered uncommon to fairly common though rarer in Mexico. It is "uncommon and local" in northern Central America, rare to fairly common in different parts of Costa Rica, "fairly common but hard to see" in Colombia, and common in most of Ecuador though local near the coast. T. a. gularis " is still known from only three specimens from the type locality [in Venezuela], and has not been seen since its original description in 1956". The other five subspecies each occur in at least one protected area.
