= Boa Nova National Park =

National park in Bahia, Brazil

- Parque Nacional de Boa Nova
- IUCN category II (national park)
- Location within Brazil
- Nearest city: Boa Nova, Bahia
- Coordinates: 14.395°S 40.126°W
- Area: 12,065.31 hectares (29,814.0 acres)
- Designation: National park
- Created: 11 June 2010
- Administrator: Chico Mendes Institute for Biodiversity Conservation

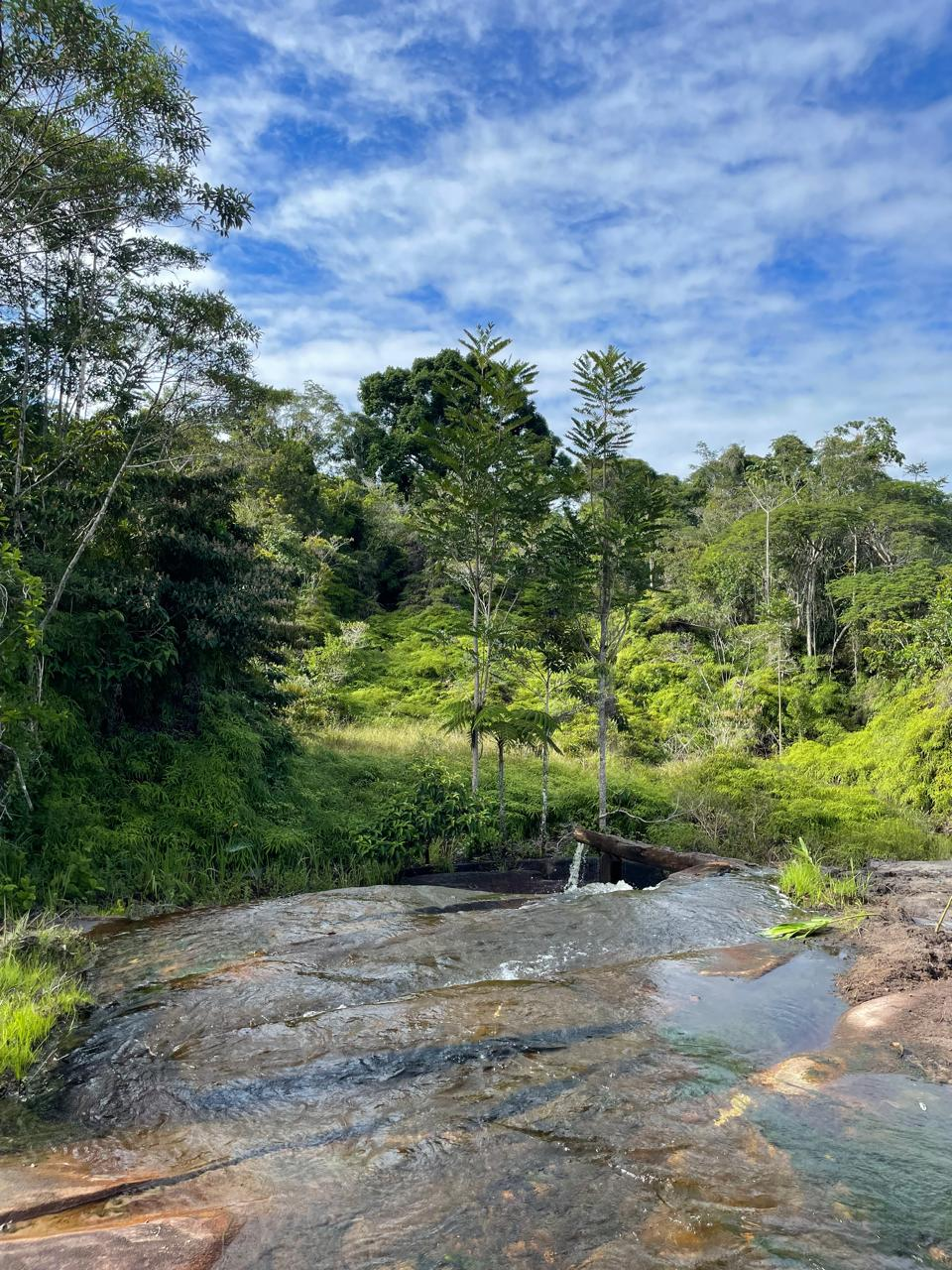
A view of Boa Nova National Park in Brasil

Boa Nova National Park (Portuguese: Parque Nacional de Boa Nova) is a national park in the state of Bahia, Brazil.

== Location ==
The Boa Nova National Park covers parts of the municipalities of Boa Nova, Dário Meira and Manoel Vitorino in Bahia. The park has an area of 12,065.31 hectares (29,814.0 acres). The terrain is rugged with altitudes from 440 to 1,111 metres (1,444 to 3,645 ft) above sea level. The park drains into the Uruba River, a tributary of the Gongogi River, which in turn is a tributary of the de Contas River.

The park is in the Atlantic Forest biome. Average annual rainfall is 1,300 millimetres (51 in). Temperatures range from 14 to 26 °C (57 to 79 °F) with an average of 23 °C (73 °F). Vegetation includes caatinga, semi-deciduous submontane forest, montane rainforest and semi-deciduous lowland forest. The region is well known for the many species of birds, with 437 recorded to date, which attract many foreign birdwatchers. Endemic bird species include the endangered or threatened slender antbird (Rhopornis ardesiacus), Bahia spinetail (Synallaxis whitneyi) and Bahia tyrannulet (Phylloscartes beckeri).

== Administration ==
The Boa Nova National Park was created by decree on 11 June 2010. It is administered by the Chico Mendes Institute for Biodiversity Conservation. The adjoining Boa Nova Wildlife Refuge was created in the same decree. The park became part of the Central Atlantic Forest Ecological Corridor, created in 2002. It is classed as classed as IUCN protected area category II. The purpose is to fully protect and regenerate the natural ecosystems in the transition between Atlantic Forest and Caatinga, to maintain viable populations of species of birds and endangered mammals, especially the slender antbird, to maintain and restore watersheds and waterways, to enable development of educational activities and environmental interpretation, recreation in contact with nature, ecological tourism and scientific research.

== Sources ==
- Lamas, Ivana Reis; Crepaldi, Maria Otávia; Mesquita, Carlos Alberto Bernardo (2015), Uma Rede no Corredor (PDF) (in Portuguese), Conservação Internacional (CI-Brasil), ISBN 978-85-98830-28-5
- Parna de Boa Nova (in Portuguese), Chico Mendes Institute for Biodiversity Conservation, archived from the original on 2020-08-09
- RVS de Boa Nova (RVS) (in Portuguese), ISA: Instituto Socioambiental
- Unidade de Conservação: Parque Nacional de Boa Nova (in Portuguese), MMA: Ministério do Meio Ambiente
