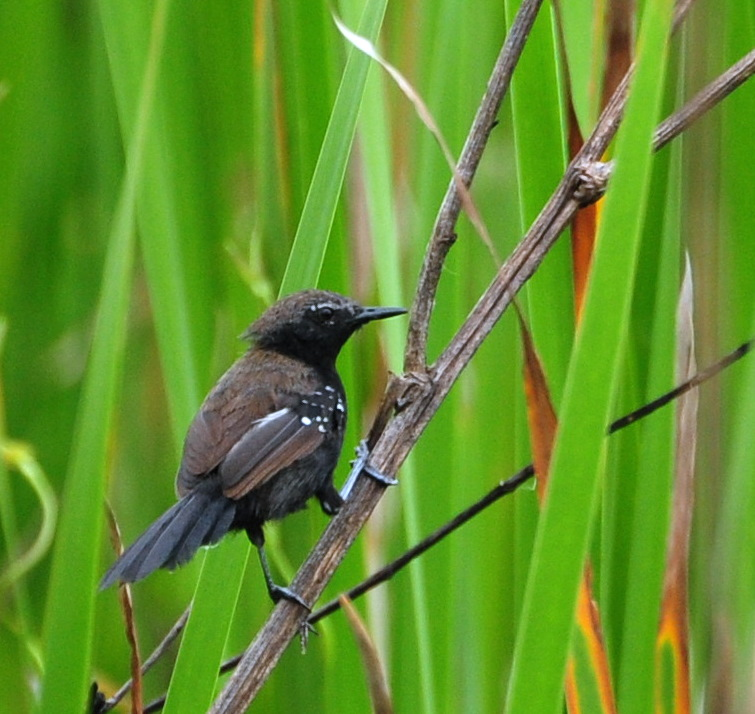
- Male of subspecies F. a. paludicola

Conservation status
- Near Threatened (IUCN 3.1); Formicivora acutirostris

- Critically Endangered (IUCN 3.1); Formicivora paludicola

Scientific classification
- Kingdom: Animalia
- Phylum: Chordata
- Class: Aves
- Order: Passeriformes
- Family: Thamnophilidae
- Genus: Formicivora
- Species: F. acutirostris

Binomial name
- Formicivora acutirostris (Bornschein, Reinert & Teixeira, 1995)

Synonyms
- Stymphalornis acutirostris

= Marsh antwren =

Species of bird in Brazil

The marsh antwren (Formicivora acutirostris) is an insectivorous bird in subfamily Thamnophilinae of family Thamnophilidae, the "typical antbirds". It is endemic to southeastern Brazil.

== Taxonomy and systematics ==
The South American Classification Committee of the American Ornithological Society (SACC), the International Ornithological Committee (IOC), and the Clements taxonomy recognize two subspecies of marsh antwren, the nominate F. a. acutirostris (Bornschein, Reinert & Teixera, 1995) and F. a. paludicola (Buzzetti et al., 2013).

The marsh antwren's taxonomy has a tortuous history and in early 2024 remains unsettled. The species was first described in 1995 as Stymphalornis acutirostris. A subsequent molecular phylogenetic study showed that it belongs in genus Formicivora and by the end of 2021 worldwide taxonomic systems had made the change.

Stymphalornis acutirostris was given the English name "marsh antwren" in 2003. The subspecies F. a. paludicola was discovered near São Paulo and described in 2013 as a new species in genus Formicivora. The authors coined the English name "São Paulo Marsh Antwren" for it, and retained the simple "marsh wren" for acutirostris. Confusingly, several authors then called the new species the "São Paulo Antwren" and acutirostris the Parana antwren. Others also called acutirostris the "Parana antwren" but used "marsh antwren" for the new paludicola despite "marsh" having originally applied to acutirostris. "Parana antwren" was soon adopted for acutirostris by most authors and taxonomic systems.

The SACC, IOC, and Clements soon recognized the new taxon but as a subspecies of acutirostris rather than as a full species. However, the fourth edition of the Howard and Moore Complete Checklist of the Birds of the World and BirdLife International's Handbook of the Birds of the World (HBW) have retained the two taxa as species, using "Parana antwren" for acutirostris and "marsh antwren" for paludicola.

This article follows the one species, two-subspecies model.

== Description ==
The marsh antwren is 13 to 15 cm (5.1 to 5.9 in) long and weighs 8 to 12 g (0.28 to 0.42 oz). Adult males of the nominate subspecies have an ill-defined pale supercilium and a whitish crescent below the eye on an otherwise lead gray face. Their forehead is grayish white and their crown and upperparts dark chestnut-olive. Their wings are blackish with chestnut-olive edges on the flight feathers. The wing coverts are darker than the flight feathers and have bright white tips. Their tail is black, sometimes with white or cream tips on the outer feathers. Their throat, breast, and belly are lead gray and their flanks and crissum dark olive brown. Adult females, like males, have an ill-defined pale supercilium and a whitish crescent below the eye, but on an otherwise black and white streaked face. They have a grayish white forehead, an olive-brown crown, and brown to grayish brown upperparts. Their wings are like the male's. Their tail is entirely black. Their throat and underparts are white with heavy black streaks on the breast that become paler on the belly. Immature males resemble adult females. Immature females have brownish spotting on their wings and less streaking on their underparts than adults.

Males of subspecies F. a. paludicola have a white supercilium on a black face. They have a gray forehead and dark grayish brown crown and upperparts. Their flight feathers are very dark brown with white inner edges and their wing coverts are mostly black with white tips. Their tail is black with white tips on the outermost two pairs of feathers. Their throat, underparts, and thighs are black with black-tipped white underwing coverts. Females have a white supercilium on a gray face. Their forehead is gray and their crown and upperparts dark grayish brown. Their wings are similar to the male's but with mostly dark grayish brown coverts. Their throat and underparts are white with black spots and their thighs black with white tips.

== Distribution and habitat ==
The marsh antwren has a disjunct distribution in southeastern Brazil. The nominate subspecies is found mostly in coastal Paraná and extreme northeastern Santa Catarina and also south locally into northeastern Rio Grande do Sul. Subspecies F. a. paludicola is found further north, at fewer than 20 sites in the upper reaches of rios Tietê and Paraíba do Sul in São Paulo state near the city of that name. As its name implies, the marsh antwren primarily inhabits coastal and riverine marshes; it occurs less frequently in flooded plains and in the transition zone between mangroves and drier land. All of these areas have fluctuating water levels. In all areas it favors dense vegetation less than 1 m (3 ft) high. In elevation the nominate subspecies is found from sea level to about 25 m (80 ft) above it; F. a. paludicola is found between 600 and 760 m (2,000 and 2,500 ft).

== Behavior ==
=== Movement ===
The marsh antwren is a year-round resident throughout its range though there appears to be some local movements between nearby sites.

=== Feeding ===
The marsh antwren's diet has not been detailed but appears to be largely or entirely arthropods. It forages singly, in pairs, or in family groups while staying within dense marsh vegetation. It actively gleans from grass, reeds, and leaves mostly by reaching and lunging; it sometimes makes short jumps or brief sallies from a perch to reach the underside of leaves. It has not been observed following army ant swarms.

=== Breeding ===
The breeding season of the marsh antwren's nominate subspecies spans from August to February. That of F. a. paludicola is not well known but appears to be primarily October to February. The nest and nesting behavioral details of paludicola are not known. The nest of acutirostris is a cup woven of plant fibers and silk from spiderwebs and arthropod cocoons, often with leaf fragments incorporated, and lined with short, fine, fibers. Most are hung in herbaceous grass or reeds, in a fork or between a fork and a parallel stalk, and within 2 m (7 ft) of the substrate. Both sexes incubate. The incubation period, time to fledging, and other details of parental care are not known. The clutch size is two white eggs which have irregular brown blotches. The average size is 19 by 14 mm (0.75 by 0.55 in) and they weigh about 1.8 g (0.063 oz).

=== Vocalization ===
The song of the marsh antwren's nominate subspecies is "doublets of abrupt notes, the first note typically more intense and lower-pitched...repeated in slightly unevenly and variably paced series". That of F. a. paludicola is "a sequence of rapidly but evenly repeated double-note phrases (the first note slightly descending, the second ending in a small upward and downward modulation)". The subspecies have a variety of calls that are similar to each other's.

== Status ==
The IUCN follows HBW taxonomy and therefore has separately assessed the "Parana" (acutrirostris) and "marsh" (paludicola) antwrens. The "Parana" antwren was originally in 2000 assessed as Endangered and in 2019 was downlisted to Near Threatened. It has a very small area of occupancy and its estimated population of between 5000 and 10,000 mature individuals is believed to be decreasing. "The most significant threat to this species is considered to be encroachment of invasive plant species, especially Brachiaria spp. and Hedychium coronari. Some patches of habitat, including the type-locality, are under constant human pressure and have been reduced by fires, allotments and landfills." Conversion of habitat for other uses, pollution, and the effects of climate change are also threats. The "marsh" (paludicola) antwren is assessed as Critically Endangered. It has a tiny area of occupancy and an estimated population of under 700 mature individuals whose trend is not known. "Current threats arise from anything affecting the tiny patchwork of marshes that form the entire range of the species. Within the last 100 years, the marshlands around Sao Paulo have been almost completely lost."
