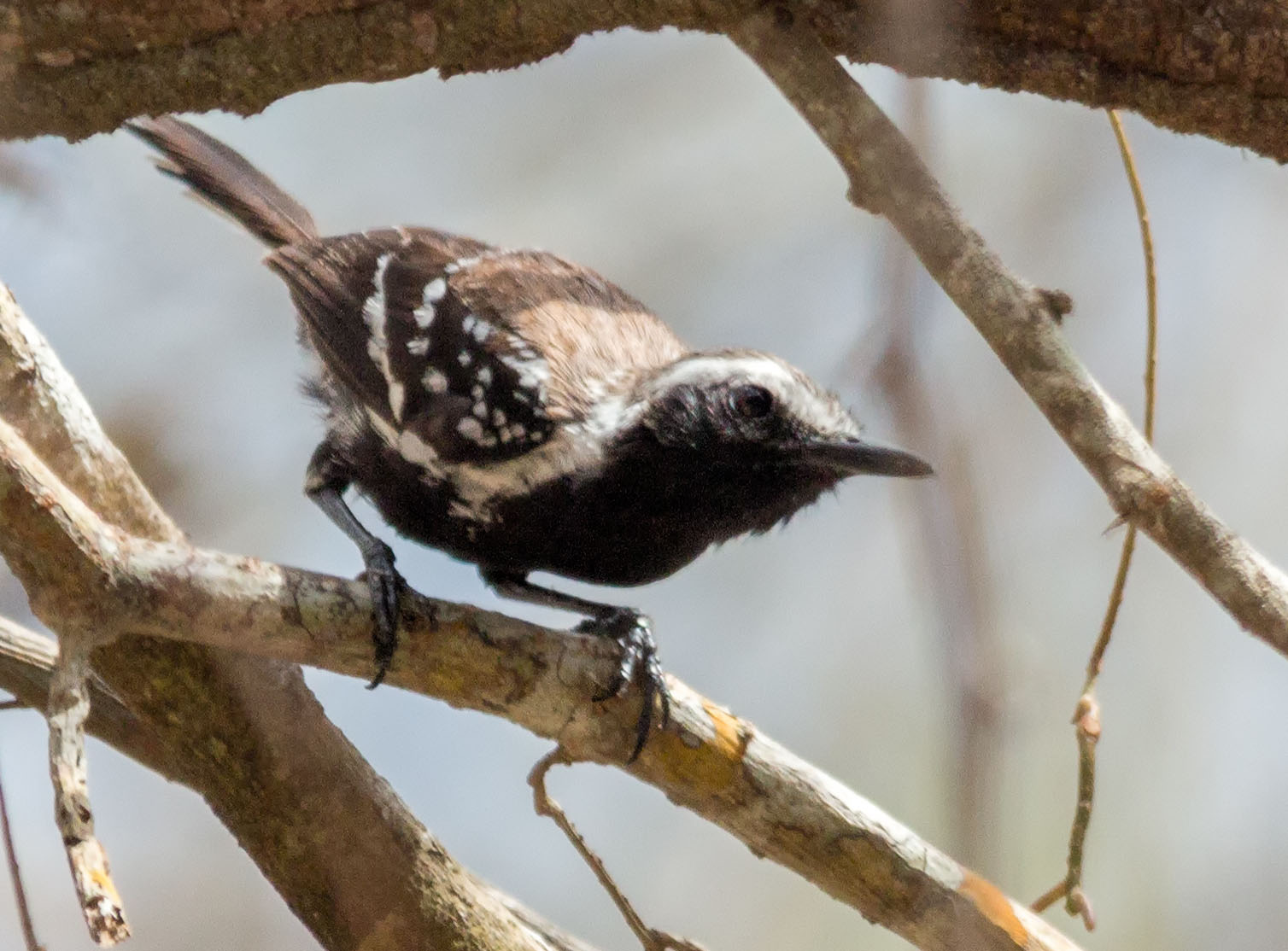

Conservation status
- Least Concern (IUCN 3.1)

Scientific classification
- Kingdom: Animalia
- Phylum: Chordata
- Class: Aves
- Order: Passeriformes
- Family: Thamnophilidae
- Genus: Formicivora
- Species: F. intermedia

Binomial name
- Formicivora intermedia Cabanis, 1847

= Northern white-fringed antwren =

Species of bird

The northern white-fringed antwren (Formicivora intermedia) is an insectivorous bird in subfamily Thamnophilinae of family Thamnophilidae, the "typical antbirds". It is found in mainland Colombia and Venezuela, on the Pearl Islands of Panama, and on the islands of Tobago and Margarita.

== Taxonomy and systematics ==
The German ornithologist Jean Cabanis described the northern white-fringed antwren in 1847 and coined its current binomial name Formicivora intermedia. It and what is now the southern white-fringed antwren (F. grisea) were later considered conspecific as the white-fringed antwren, which retained the binomial F. grisea. Worldwide taxonomic systems separated them again based primarily on their very different vocalizations detailed in a 2016 publication, though the Clements taxonomy did not do so until 2023. The North and South American Classification Committees of the American Ornithological Society retain the single white-fringed antwren species, though the South American Committee is seeking a proposal to adopt the split.

The northern white-fringed antwren has these six subspecies:

- F. i. alticincta Bangs
- F. i. hondae (Chapman, 1914)
- F. i. fumosa (Cory, 1913)
- F. i. intermedia Cabanis, 1847
- F. i. tobagensis Dalmas, 1900
- F. i. orenocensis Hellmayr, 1904

== Description ==
The northern white-fringed antwren is 12 to 13 cm (4.7 to 5.1 in) long and weighs 8 to 14 grams (0.28 to 0.49 oz). Adult males of the nominate subspecies F. i. intermedia have a white supercilium that extends down the neck, along the side of the breast, and widens on the flanks. Their crown and upperparts are smoky brown. Their wings are black with a wide white bar and white dots on the coverts. Their tail is black with white feather tips. Their face, throat, and underparts are black. Adult females have upperparts like the male's. Their face is grayish and their underparts dirty white to buff; their breast has variable dusky streaks and mottling.

With the exception of subspecies F. i. orenocensis the males of the other subspecies of the northern white-fringed antwren have the same plumage as the nominate. The females and both sexes of orenocensis differ from the nominate and each other thus:

- F. i. alticincta: female has cinnamon-tinged whitish throat and underparts
- F. i. hondae: female like alticincta but with paler upperparts
- F. i. fumosa: female darker overall than nominate with more heavily spotted underparts
- F. i. tobagensis: female has buff-tinged white throat and underparts with blackish spots on the breast
- F. i. orenocensis: both sexes have reddish yellow-brown upperparts; female has white underparts with heavy black streaks

== Distribution and habitat ==
The subspecies of the northern white-fringed antwren are found thus:

- F. i. alticincta: the Pearl Islands off southern Panama
- F. i. hondae: Colombia from Atlántico Department south to Antioquia Department and to Huila Department along the Magdalena Valley
- F. i. fumosa: eastern Norte de Santander Department in northeastern Colombia and in western Venezuela's states of Zulia, Trujillo, Mérida, and Táchira
- F. i. intermedia: northern Colombia's departments of Magdalena, Cesar, and La Guajira; northern Venezuela from Zulia east to Monagas and Sucre and on Margarita Island; Chacachacare island of Trinidad and Tobago
- F. i. tobagensis: Tobago
- F. i. orenocensis: Venezuela south of the Orinoco River in Bolívar and extreme northern Amazonas and locally north and south of the Orinoco in Anzoátegui, eastern Monagas, and Delta Amacuro

The white-fringed antwren inhabits a variety of wooded landscapes, where it favors the understorey to mid-storey at the forest's edges. In most of its range these include deciduous forest, wooded savanna, gallery forest, mangroves, and thorn scrub. In southern Venezuela F. i. orenocensis is mostly found in campina woodland on white-sand soil or young secondary forest. In elevation it mostly occurs below 1,000 m (3,300 ft) but reaches 1,200 m (3,900 ft) in Colombia and 1,600 m (5,200 ft) in Venezuela. Subspecies F. i. alticincta reaches only 200 m (660 ft) on the Pearl Islands.

== Behavior ==
=== Movement ===
The northern white-fringed antwren is believed to be a year-round resident throughout its range.

=== Feeding ===
The northern white-fringed antwren feeds on a wide variety of insects and spiders. It typically forages singly, in pairs, or in family groups, and sometimes temporarily as part of a mixed-species feeding flock. It usually forages from the ground to about 5 m (16 ft) above it, but as high as 13 m (43 ft) in gallery and deciduous forest. It forages actively in dense vegetation, taking most prey by gleaning from live leaves, vines, branches, and stems. It sometimes makes short jumps from a perch to reach the underside of leaves and makes short sallies from a perch to capture moths in flight.

=== Breeding ===
The northern white-fringed antwren's breeding season varies geographically, spanning April to October in northern Colombia, May to September in north-central Venezuela, and April to August on Tobago. Its nest is a cup woven from grass stems and thin plant fibers suspended in a branch fork, typically 0.3 to 3.5 m (1 to 11 ft) above the ground; both sexes build it. The usual clutch size is two eggs, which are creamy or grayish white with variable markings of lilac to deep purple. The incubation period, time to fledging, and details of parental care are not known.

=== Vocalization ===
The northern white-fringed antwren has several vocalizations. The "monotone song" is a "single soft pup or chup note". It is repeated up to 25 times but is sometimes made only two to five times. The "trilled song" is a "mellow overslurred whistle followed by a fast flat-pitched soft trill: puuh-didididididi". It also makes a "somewhat complex underslurred note sounding disyllabic: churet or chuweet". There are some minor geographic variations. Both sexes sing, typically when hidden in foliage, and mostly from before dawn into the morning.

== Status ==
The IUCN has assessed the northern white-fringed antwren as being of Least Concern. It has a very large range. Its population size is not known and is believed to be decreasing. No immediate threats have been identified. It occurs in several protected areas and its "range covers extensive areas of habitat which, although not formally protected, are at little risk of development in the near future". The informally protected areas include huge ranches in the Venezuelan Llanos. "This species' ability to utilize a variety of second-growth and edge habitats renders it less vulnerable to disturbance than most thamnophilid (Thamnophilidae) species".
