= Manoel Vitorino =

Municipality of Bahia, Brazil

Coordinates: 14°08′42″S 40°14′34″W

- Municipality
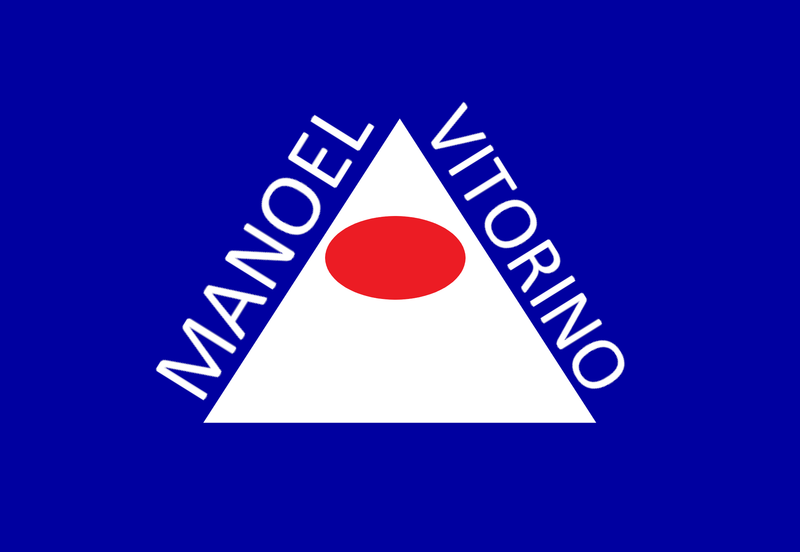
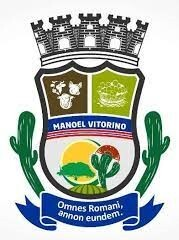
- Flag Coat of arms

- Location in Bahia
- Country: Brazil
- Region: Nordeste
- State: Bahia

Population (2020)
  - Total: 13,087
- Time zone: UTC−3 (BRT)

Manoel Vitorino is a municipality in the state of Bahia in the North-East region of Brazil.

The municipality contains part of the 12,065 hectares (29,810 acres) Boa Nova National Park, established in 2010, a centre for birdwatching.

== See also ==
- List of municipalities in Bahia
