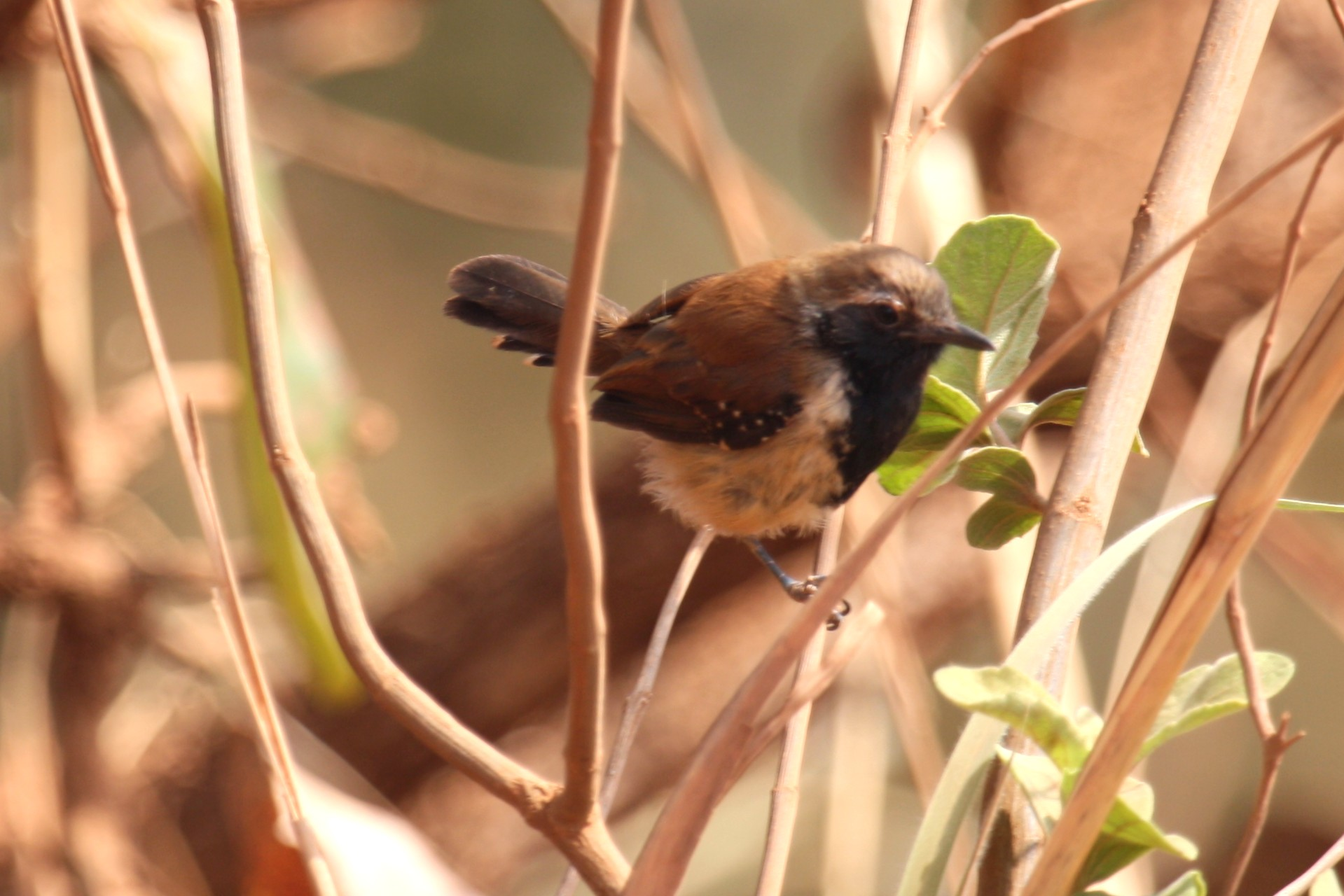
- Male in Mato Grosso
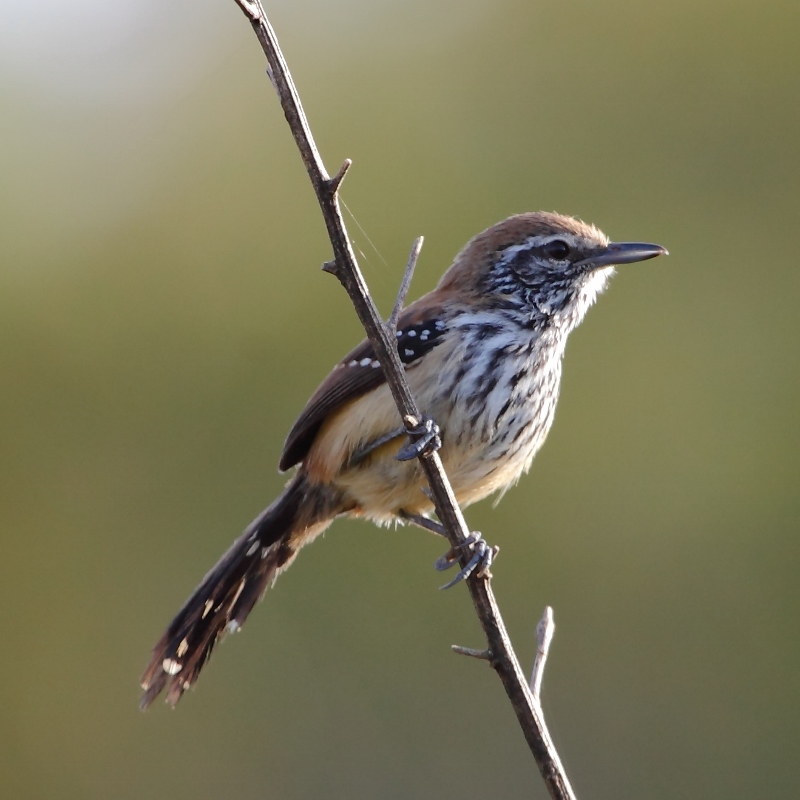
- Female at Dourado, São Paulo state, Brazil

Conservation status
- Least Concern (IUCN 3.1)

Scientific classification
- Kingdom: Animalia
- Phylum: Chordata
- Class: Aves
- Order: Passeriformes
- Family: Thamnophilidae
- Genus: Formicivora
- Species: F. rufa

Binomial name
- Formicivora rufa (Wied, 1831)

= Rusty-backed antwren =

Species of bird

The rusty-backed antwren (Formicivora rufa) is a species of bird in the family Thamnophilidae, the "typical antbirds". It is found in Bolivia, Brazil, Paraguay, Peru, and Suriname.

== Taxonomy and systematics ==
The rusty-backed antwren has three subspecies, the nominate F. rufa rufa, F. r. urubambae, and F. r. chapmani.

== Description ==
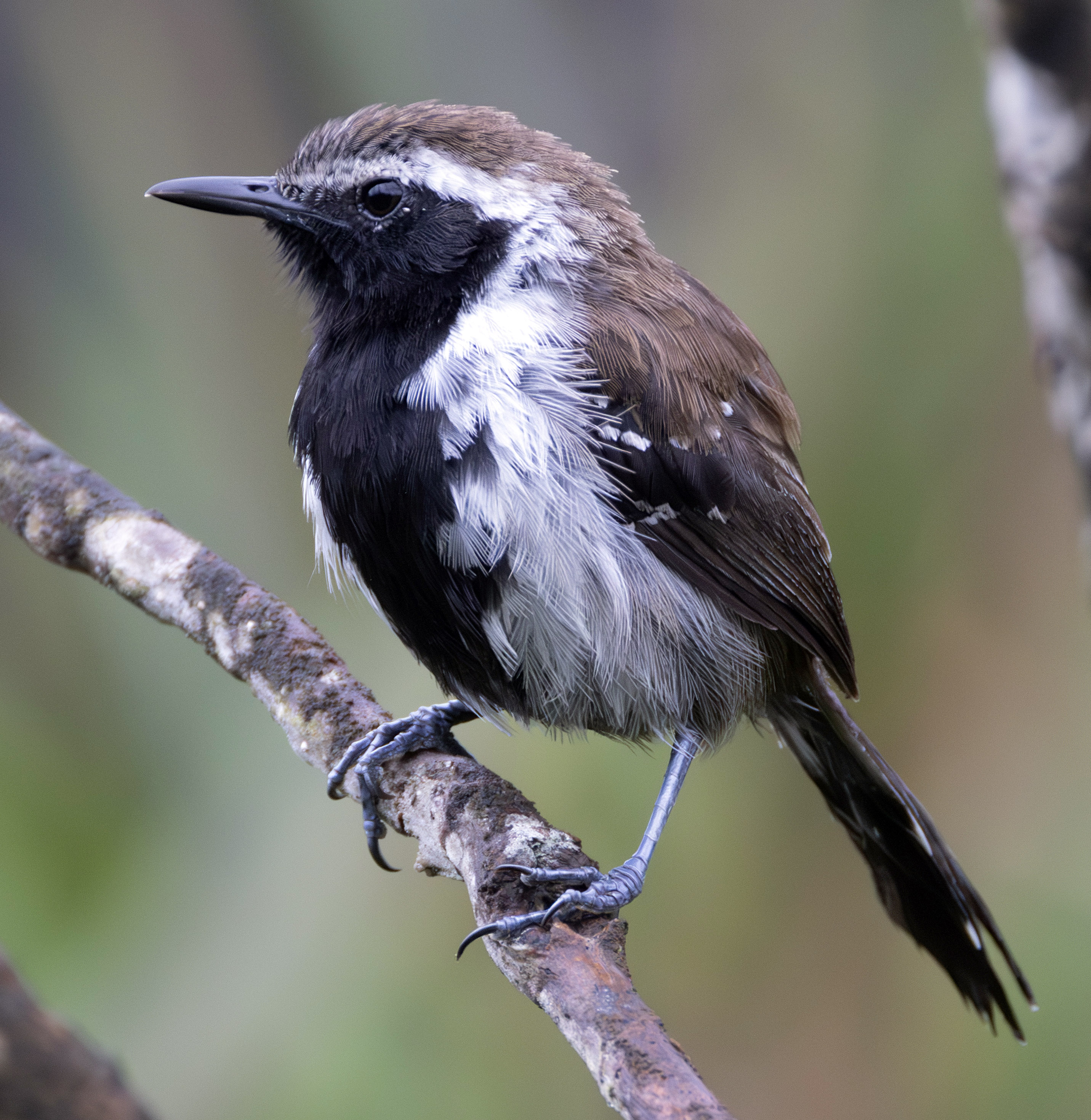
Male, NE Brazil

The rusty-backed antwren is 12 to 13 cm (4.7 to 5.1 in) long and weighs 11.5 to 14 g (0.41 to 0.49 oz). The males of all three subspecies have a tawny rufous crown and upperparts. They have a white supercilium and the rest of the face and the throat are black. The middle of the breast is black with a white edge separating it from the cinnamon-buff flanks; the belly is white. The folded wings show lines of white dots. The tail feathers are black with chestnut fringes, white sides, and white tips. The nominate female has paler rufous upperparts than the male. The face, throat, and chest are streaked black and white and the rest of the underparts are cinnamon. The female of F. r. urubambae has much heavier streaking on the underparts than the nominate and its tail is blacker. The female of F. r. chapmani is intermediate between the other two subspecies but closer in appearance to urubambae.

== Distribution and habitat ==
The nominate subspecies of rusty-backed antwren is found widely across south-central and eastern Brazil from the Atlantic Ocean west intro extreme southeastern Peru, much of eastern Bolivia, and central and northeastern Paraguay. F. r. urubambae is found discontinuously in Peru's departments of San Martín, Ucayali, and Cuzco. F. r. chapmani is found discontinuously in southern Suriname and a few east-central states of Brazil. It is believed to be resident in all parts of its range.

The rusty-backed antwren inhabits a variety of semi-open to open landscapes such as cerrado, campos with scattered trees, white sand forest, and scrublands. In elevation it ranges from sea level in the east to as high as 1,450 m (4,800 ft) in Peru and Bolivia.

== Behavior ==
=== Feeding ===
The rusty-backed antwren's diet is known to include insects and thought also to include spiders. It is an active forager, hopping through the interior of bushes and small trees and making short sally flights to glean prey from foliage. It does not appear to follow army ant swarms.

=== Breeding ===
The rusty-backed antwren's breeding season in Brazil spans from September to May. One nest in São Paulo state was a deep cup made of grass stems in the fork of a twig in a small bush. In a study of 47 nests in the southeastern coastal zone, nesting was concentrated between October and early March. Both sexes contributed to nest building, incubation, and provisioning of nestlings. The clutch size was always two eggs. Incubation lasted an average of 16 days, and fledging occurred eight to 10 days after hatch. About two thirds of the broods were lost to predation. Pairs made up to four nesting attempts.

=== Vocalization ===
The rusty-backed antwren's song is "a long rattle of evenly pitched harsh or sharp notes, often increasing in intensity" that appears to vary geographically. Common calls are "an explosive or strident 'chip cheep' or 'tit-tweep'".

== Status ==
The IUCN has assessed the rusty-backed antwren as being of Least Concern. It has a large range, and though its population size is not known, it is believed to be stable. It inhabits a variety of habitats and is found in several protected areas.
