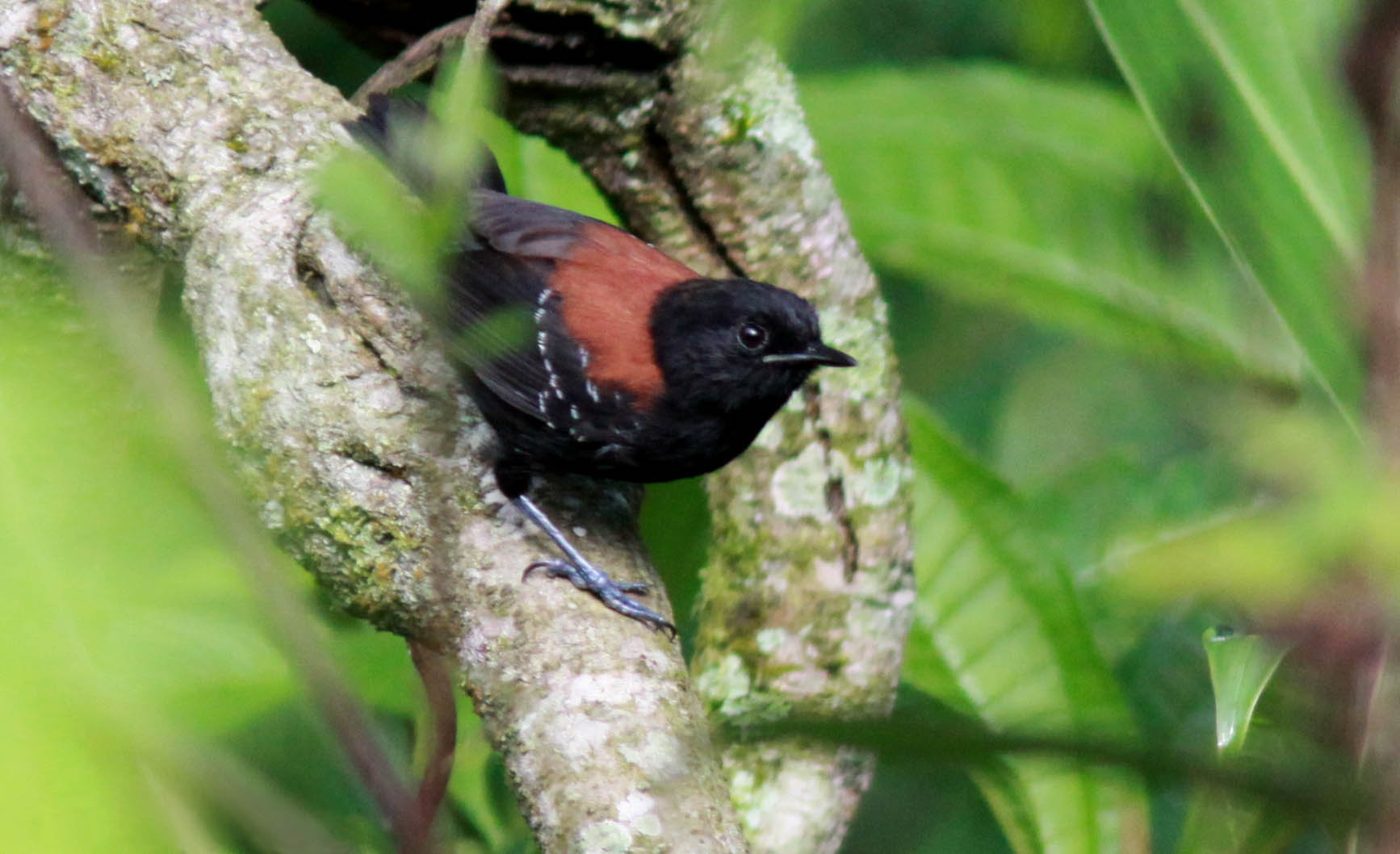
- Male
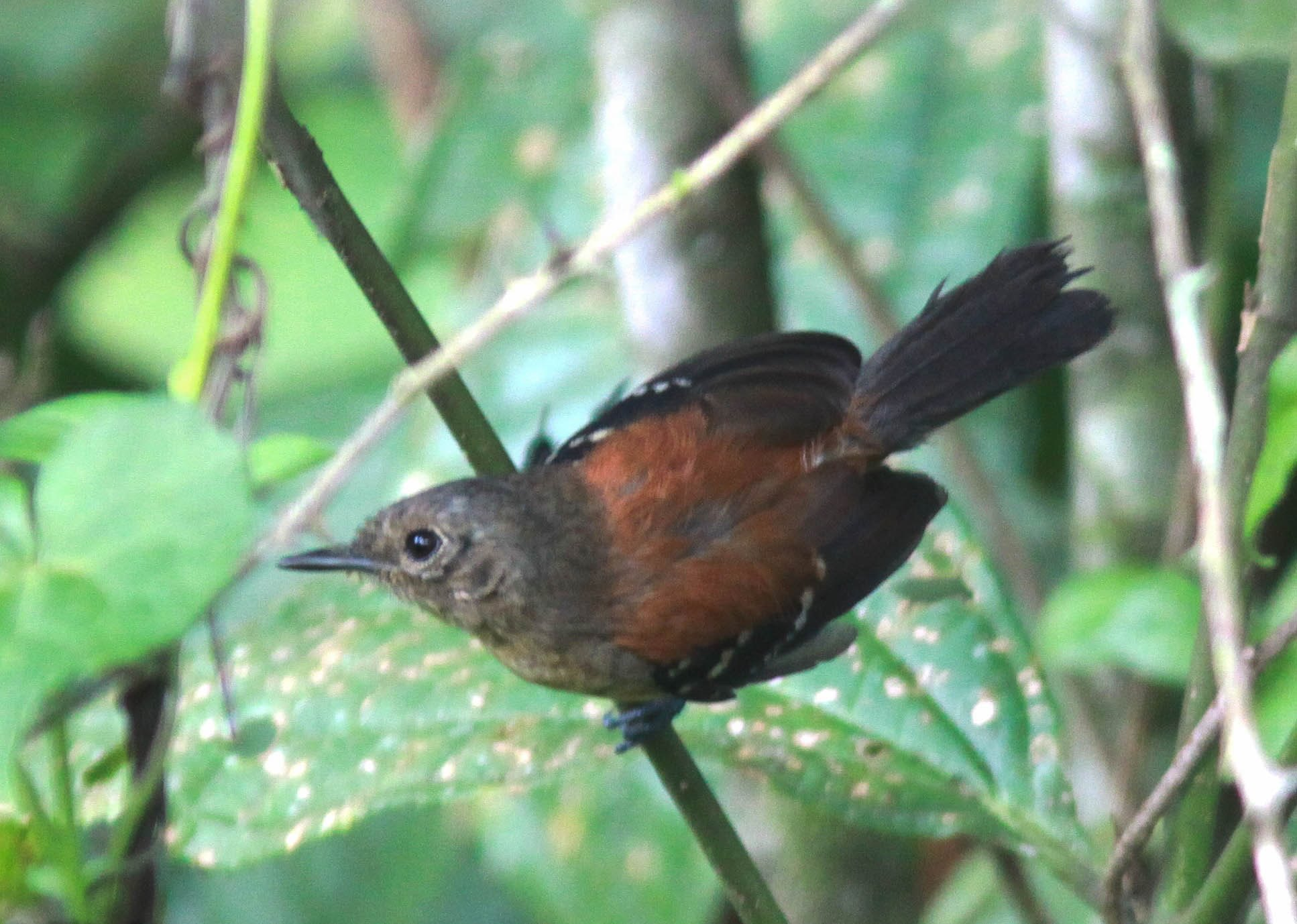
- Female

Conservation status
- Endangered (IUCN 3.1)

Scientific classification
- Kingdom: Animalia
- Phylum: Chordata
- Class: Aves
- Order: Passeriformes
- Family: Thamnophilidae
- Genus: Formicivora
- Species: F. erythronotos

Binomial name
- Formicivora erythronotos Hartlaub, 1852

Synonyms
- Myrmotherula erythronotos

= Black-hooded antwren =

Species of bird

The black-hooded antwren (Formicivora erythronotos) is an Endangered Species of bird in subfamily Thamnophilinae of family Thamnophilidae, the "typical antbirds". It is endemic to Brazil.

== Taxonomy and systematics ==
The black-hooded antwren was originally described as Formicivora erythronotos. During much of the 20th century it was placed in genus Myrmotherula but by around the year 2000 it was returned to Formicivora on the basis of a morphological and vocal study.

The black-hooded antwren is monotypic.

== Description ==
The black-hooded antwren is 11 cm (4.3 in) long. Adult males have a deep rufous back, rump, and uppertail coverts. They are otherwise almost entirely black, with white tips on the wing coverts and white flanks. The center of their throat and breast are black, their flanks white, and their undertail coverts have white bars. Adult females also have deep rufous upperparts. They are mostly olive-brown otherwise, which color is paler and buffier on their underparts. Their wings and tail are blackish with white tips on the coverts. They have variable amounts of thin dark streaks or mottling on their head and throat. Adults have a slim black bill.

== Distribution and habitat ==
The black-hooded antwren was known from about 20 specimens collected in the 19th century but was not seen for more than 100 years until it was rediscovered in 1987. It was thought to occur somewhat inland near Nova Friburgo but records there are apparently erroneous. It is now found in several subpopulations along the coast of Baía da Ilha Grande in Rio de Janeiro state. There it typically inhabits areas in the early stages of succession such as young second growth and secondary forest. It also occurs in abandoned banana plantations that are reverting to forest.

== Behavior ==
=== Movement ===
The black-hooded antwren is believed to be a year-round resident throughout its range.

=== Feeding ===
The diet of the black-hooded antwren is not known in detail but includes insects, spiders, and small frogs. It typically forages singly, in pairs, or in family groups, and only seldom if ever as part of a mixed-species feeding flock. It usually forages between the ground and about 3 m (10 ft) above it but occasionally feeds as high as 7 m (23 ft). It forages actively, taking most prey by gleaning from live leaves, vines, branches, and stems. It sometimes makes short sallies from a perch to reach the underside of leaves. It is not known to follow army ant swarms.

=== Breeding ===
Black-hooded antwren nests have been found between mid-August and February. Both sexes build the nest. The nest is a small cup made from rootlets and plant fibers with bryophytes on the outside, attached by its rim to a small branch near the ground. The usual clutch size is two eggs. The incubation period is 13 to 15 days and fledging occurs 10 to 11 days after hatch. Both parents incubate the eggs and brood and provision the nestlings, though the female alone broods at night.

=== Vocalization ===
The black-hooded antwren's song is a "high, level, rattling 'tjotjotjo---' (2-3 sec)" that is also described as a "three-second series of low-pitched tchóup calls". Its calls include a "soft 'chep-ep' " and an "explosive, nasal descending note that is often doubled".

== Status ==
The IUCN originally in 1988 assessed the black-hooded antwren as Threatened, then in 1994 as Critically Endangered, and since 2000 as Endangered. It has a very small and fragmented range within which about 90% of the species is found in two of the approximately 10 subpopulations. Its total population is estimated to be between 300 and 8500 mature individuals. "Development of the narrow coastal plain for tourism and beachside housing has been extensive and threatens the small remnant patches of suitable habitat." It is listed as Critically Endangered by Brazilian authorities and was placed on the US Endangered Species List in 2010.
