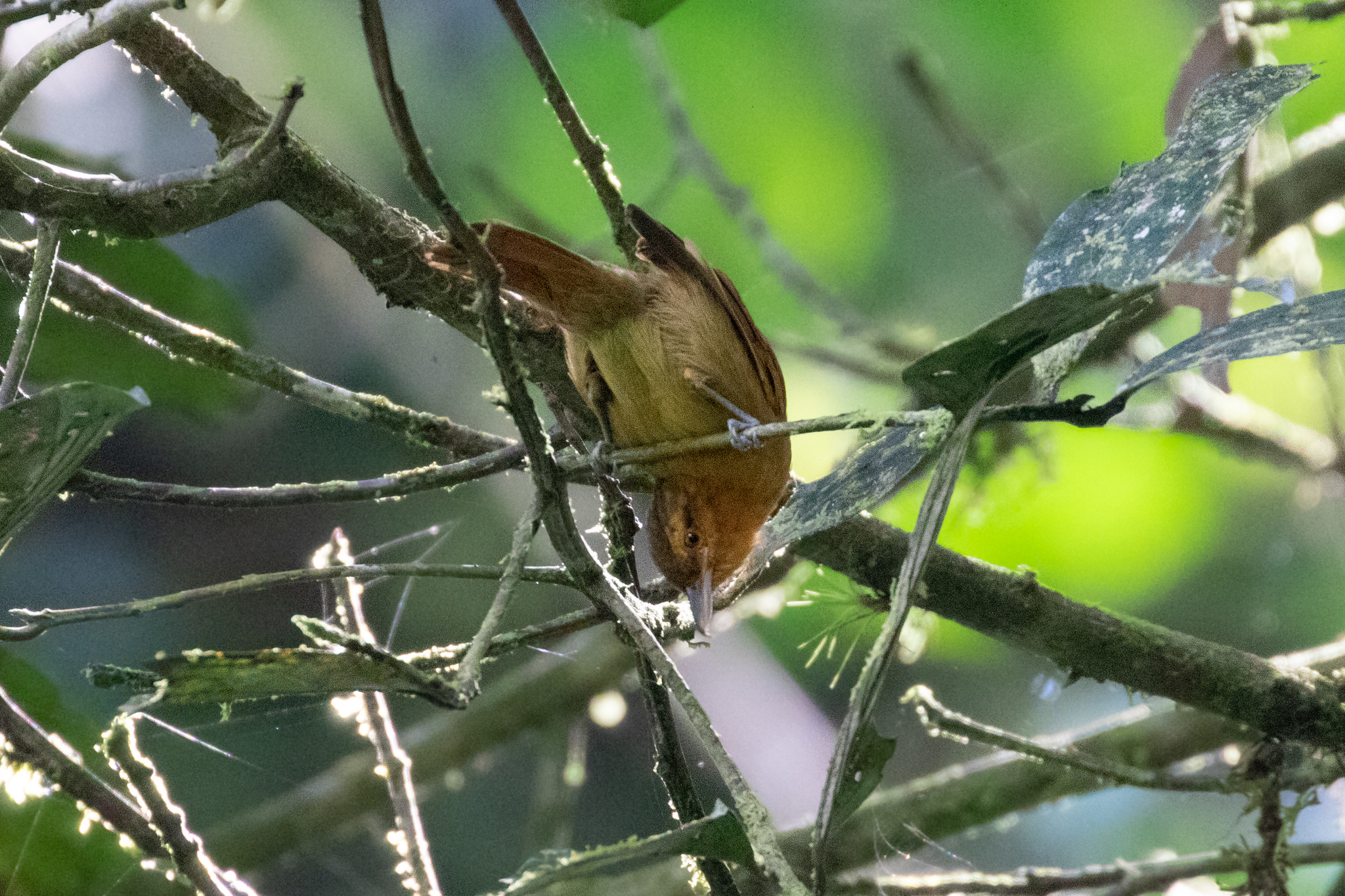

Scientific classification
- Kingdom: Animalia
- Phylum: Chordata
- Class: Aves
- Order: Passeriformes
- Family: Thamnophilidae
- Genus: Thamnistes
- Species: T. rufescens

Binomial name
- Thamnistes rufescens Cabanis, 1873

Synonyms
- Thamnistes anabatinus rufescens

= Rufescent antshrike =

Species of bird

The rufescent antshrike (Thamnistes rufescens) is a passerine bird in subfamily Myrmornithinae of family Thamnophilidae, the "typical antbirds". It is found in Bolivia and Peru.

== Taxonomy and systematics ==
The taxonomy of the rufescent antshrike is unsettled. In 2018 the International Ornithological Committee (IOC) and the Clements taxonomy recognized it as a separate species by splitting it from the russet antshrike (T. anabatinus). However, BirdLife International's Handbook of the Birds of the World (HBW) treats it as a subspecies of the "eastern russet antshrike" (T. aequatorialis).

The rufescent antshrike is monotypic.

== Description ==
The rufescent antshrike is 15 to 16 cm (5.9 to 6.3 in) long. The species has a rather stocky body and a heavy bill with a hooked tip. The sexes have almost identical plumage. Adults have a bright ochraceous face with a fainter supercilium. Their forehead, crown, and upperparts are olive-brown. Their tail is rufous and their wings cinnamon-rufous. Their throat is dull olive-yellow and their breast and belly are ochraceous with an olive tinge. Males have a patch of bright orange-rufous between their shoulders; females lack it. In both sexes their iris is light reddish brown, their maxilla dusky horn, their mandible a lighter horn, and their legs and feet olive.

== Distribution and habitat ==
The rufescent antshrike is found south of the Río Marañón on the east slope of the Andes in much of eastern Peru and into at least the departments of La Paz and Cochabamba in western and central Bolivia. It inhabits lowland and lower montane evergreen forest and adjacent secondary forest. It usually remains in the forest subcanopy and canopy. In elevation it ranges between 600 and 1,600 m (2,000 and 5,200 ft) in Peru and probably in a similar interval in Bolivia.

== Behavior ==
=== Movement ===
The rufescent antshrike is a year-round resident throughout its range.

=== Feeding ===
The rufescent antshrike's diet and foraging behavior are apparently mostly the same as those of its former "parent" russet antshrike (which see here) though it has not been seen associating with army ant swarms.

=== Breeding ===
Nothing is known about the rufescent antshrike's breeding biology.

=== Vocalization ===
The rufescent antshrike's "slow song" is "a high, slightly accelerating, rising series of thin downslurred whistles: tseeeu-tsew-tsew-tsew-tsew". It also has a "rapid song" that differs from that of the russet antshrike (which see here) "in pace, highest note peak, and rise in frequency". The rufescent antshrike's calls include "a high-pitched swee-tip, or a more simple swee, and in Puno (extreme SE Peru) a short, descending tsew".

== Status ==
The IUCN follows HBW taxonomy and so has not assessed the rufescent antshrike separately from the "eastern" russet antshrike. It is considered uncommon to locally fairly common. "No immediate threats have been noted, although the foothill/mid-elevation forests inhabited by this species throughout its range are under threat of deforestation for logging and agriculture. It is known from several protected areas, but overall its population health has not been evaluated."
