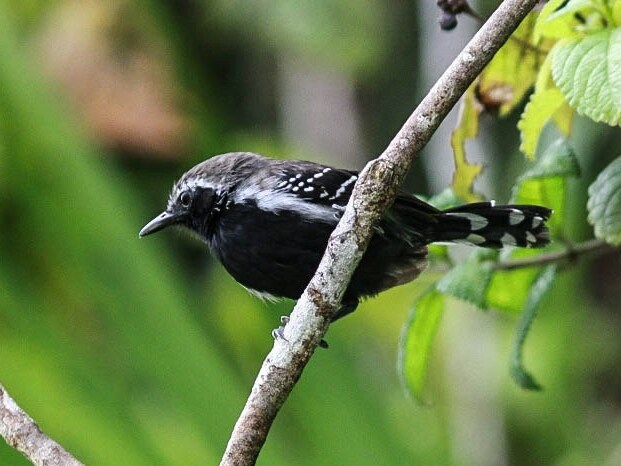

Conservation status
- Least Concern (IUCN 3.1)

Scientific classification
- Kingdom: Animalia
- Phylum: Chordata
- Class: Aves
- Order: Passeriformes
- Family: Thamnophilidae
- Genus: Formicivora
- Species: F. grisea

Binomial name
- Formicivora grisea (Boddaert, 1783)

= Southern white-fringed antwren =

Species of bird

The southern white-fringed antwren (Formicivora grisea) is an insectivorous bird in subfamily Thamnophilinae of family Thamnophilidae, the "typical antbirds". It is found in Brazil, Colombia, French Guiana, Guyana, Suriname, and Venezuela.

== Taxonomy and systematics ==
The southern white-fringed antwren was described by the French polymath Georges-Louis Leclerc, Comte de Buffon in his Histoire Naturelle des Oiseaux in 1775 from a specimen collected in Cayenne, French Guiana. The bird was also illustrated in a hand-colored plate engraved by François-Nicolas Martinet in the Planches Enluminées D'Histoire Naturelle which was produced under the supervision of Edme-Louis Daubenton to accompany Buffon's text. Neither the plate caption nor Buffon's description included a scientific name but in 1783 the Dutch naturalist Pieter Boddaert coined the binomial name Turdus griseus in his catalogue of the Planches Enluminées. The southern white-fringed antwren is now placed in the genus Formicivora that was introduced by the English naturalist William Swainson in 1824. The generic name combines the Latin words formica for "ant" and -vorus "eating" from vorare "to devour". The specific epithet grisea is from the Medieval Latin griseus meaning "gray".

What is now the northern white-fringed antwren (Formicivora intermedia) and the southern white-fringed antwren were previously considered conspecific as the white-fringed antwren Formicivora grisea. Worldwide taxonomic systems separated them based primarily on their very different vocalizations detailed in a 2016 publication, though the Clements taxonomy did not do so until 2023. The North and South American Classification Committees of the American Ornithological Society retain the single white-fringed antwren species, though the South American Committee is seeking a proposal to adopt the split.

The southern white-fringed antwren has two subspecies, the nominate F. g. grisea (Boddaert, 1783) and F. g. rufiventris (Carriker, 1936).

== Description ==
The southern white-fringed antwren is 12 to 13 cm (4.7 to 5.1 in) long and weighs 9 to 12 grams (0.32 to 0.42 oz). Adult males of the nominate subspecies have a white supercilium that extends down the neck, along the side of the breast, and widens on the flanks. Their crown and upperparts are dark grayish brown with white edges on the scapulars and a hidden white patch between them. Their wings are brownish black with white tips on the coverts. Their tail is black with white feather tips that increase in size from the central to the outer feathers. Their face, throat, and underparts are black with white underwing coverts. Adult females have a buff supercilium, browner wings, little or no patch between the scapulars, and a blackish and buff-white mottled face. Their throat and belly are light cinnamon and their breast cinnamon with a tawny tinge. Subadult males early look like adult females and gain a black throat and breast before the rest of the adult plumage. Males of subspecies F. g. rufiventris are like the nominate; females have entirely rufous underparts.

== Distribution and habitat ==
The southern white-fringed antwren has a disjunct distribution. The nominate subspecies is found in northern Brazil and the Guianas and separately from there in much of Amazonian and eastern Brazil. Subspecies F. g. rufiventris is found from Meta and Caquetá departments in Colombia east into most of Venezuela's Amazonas state. The species inhabits a variety of wooded landscapes, where it favors the understorey to mid-storey at the forest's edges. Subspecies F. g. rufiventris mostly occurs in campina on white-sand soil or young secondary forest. The nominate subspecies occurs in mangroves in the Guianas, in second growth and riparian vegetation in Amazonian Brazil, in tropical deciduous forest in the interior of northeastern Brazil, and in restinga scrublands in coastal eastern Brazil. In elevation it mostly occurs below 1,000 m (3,300 ft) but reaches 1,600 m (5,200 ft) in Venezuela.

== Behavior ==
=== Movement ===
The southern white-fringed antwren is believed to be a year-round resident throughout its range.

=== Feeding ===
The southern white-fringed antwren feeds on a wide variety of insects and spiders. It typically forages singly, in pairs, or in family groups, and sometimes temporarily as part of a mixed-species feeding flock. It usually forages from the ground to about 5 m (16 ft) above it, but as high as 13 m (43 ft) in gallery and deciduous forest. It forages actively in dense vegetation, taking most prey by gleaning from live leaves, vines, branches, and stems. It sometimes makes short jumps from a perch to reach the underside of leaves and makes short sallies from a perch to capture moths in flight. There are a few records of it following army ant swarms in Amazonian Brazil.

=== Breeding ===
The southern white-fringed antwren's breeding season varies greatly across its range, with differing periods between July and March. Its nest is a cup woven from grass stems and thin plant fibers suspended in a branch fork, typically 0.5 to 3.5 m (2 to 11 ft) above the ground; both sexes build it. The usual clutch size is two eggs, which are creamy or grayish white with variable markings of lilac to deep purple. The incubation period, time to fledging, and details of parental care are not known.

=== Vocalization ===
The southern white-fringed antwren has several vocalizations. The "monotone song" is a "single soft chup note repeated...as many as 50 notes". Another is an "extremely variable complex note...churet or chuweet. A third is "kip-chrup [a] liquid phrase of two well-spaced notes". There are some minor geographic variations. Both sexes sing, typically when hidden in foliage, and mostly in the morning.

== Status ==
The IUCN has assessed the southern white-fringed antwren as being of Least Concern. It has a very large range. Its population size is not known and is believed to be decreasing. No immediate threats have been identified. It is considered uncommon to fairly common across its range. It occurs in several protected areas and its "range covers extensive areas of habitat which, although not formally protected, are at little risk of development in the near future. This species' ability to utilize a variety of second-growth and edge habitats renders it less vulnerable to disturbance than are most thamnophilid (Thamnophilidae) species".
