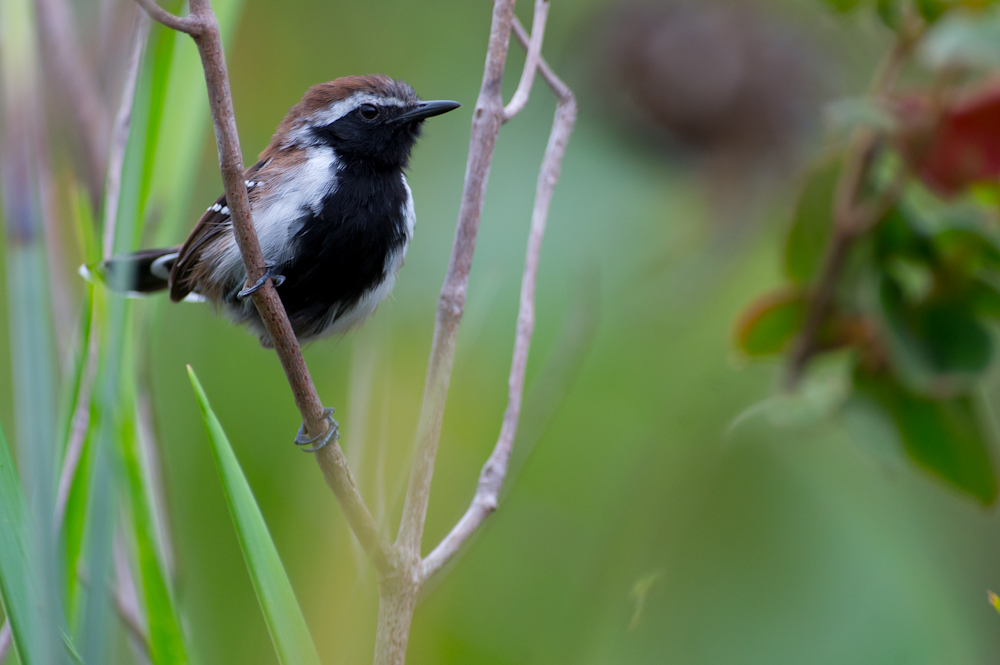
- Adult male

Conservation status
- Vulnerable (IUCN 3.1)

Scientific classification
- Kingdom: Animalia
- Phylum: Chordata
- Class: Aves
- Order: Passeriformes
- Family: Thamnophilidae
- Genus: Formicivora
- Species: F. grantsaui

Binomial name
- Formicivora grantsaui Gonzaga, Carvalhaes & Buzzetti, 2007

= Sincorá antwren =

Sincora antwren

Species of bird in Brazil

The Sincora antwren (Note: The IOC and other taxonomic systems spell the English name with no diacritics. The IOC is the Wikipedia standard for bird names.) (Formicivora grantsaui) is a small, Vulnerable species of passerine bird in subfamily Thamnophilinae of family Thamnophilidae, the "typical antbirds". It is endemic to a small area of eastern Brazil.

== Taxonomy and systematics ==
The Sincora antwren was first described in 2007 from specimens collected near the small town of Mucugê in the state of Bahia, eastern Brazil. The specific epithet commemorates the German-born naturalist Rolf Grantsau who had collected a specimen in 1965. Coincidentally, another species was also described from the same region in 2007, the Diamantina tapaculo (Scytalopus diamantinensis).

The Sincora antwren is monotypic.

== Description ==
The Sincora antwren is 12 to 13 cm (4.7 to 5.1 in) long and weighs 8.5 to 11.5 g (0.30 to 0.41 oz). Adult males have a white supercilium that extends down the neck and along the sides of the breast and belly. Their crown and upperparts are generally deep brown; the color is grayer on the forehead and brighter on the mantle and scapulars. Their wing coverts are black with white spots on the ends and their flight feathers are dark brownish gray with thin brown outer edges. Their tail feathers are gray and black with narrow white tips on the central ones and wide white tips on the rest. Their face, throat, and underparts are black with deep brown flanks and gray and white underwing coverts. Adult females have a paler brown crown and back than males. They have a thin black band through the eye and their face, throat, and breast are whitish with wide black streaks. Both sexes have a dark brown iris, bare grayish black skin around the eye, dark plumbeous gray legs, and dark plumbeous gray feet with yellow soles. Males have a black bill; females have a black bill with a bluish gray base.

== Distribution and habitat ==
The Sincora antwren is found in the Serra do Sincorá, part of the Espinhaço Mountains located at the eastern edge of the Chapada Diamantina region of Brazil's Bahia state. It inhabits campo rupestre, a biome characterized by scrub and grasses on poor soil among rocky outcrops, which in the Chapada Diamantina are sandstone. In elevation it ranges between 850 and 1,100 m (2,800 and 3,600 ft).

== Behavior ==
=== Movement ===
The Sincora antwren is believed to be a year-round resident throughout its range.

=== Feeding ===
The Sincora antwren's diet and foraging behavior are not known but are assumed to be similar to those of others of its genus. They feed on arthropods, usually in pairs or family groups.

=== Breeding ===
Nothing is known about the Sincora antwren's breeding biology.

=== Vocalization ===
The Sincora antwren's song is a "slow (2 notes/sec) series of very short, very high 'tjew' notes". It has "a distinctive two-part alarm call containing more than 2 (rarely only 2) notes".

== Status ==
The IUCN did not recognize the Sincora antwren until 2011, when it assessed the species as Near Threatened. The species was uplisted to Endangered in 2016, and was downlisted to Vulnerable in 2025. It has a small range of 2,700 km^{2} (1,000 sq mi) and its population size is unknown but is believed to be decreasing. The principal threats are mining, logging, and fire, though their relative severity is not known. Brazilian authorities also consider it Endangered. It is "[s]aid to be locally common", and part of its range is protected as Chapada Diamantina National Park.
