= Boa Nova =

Municipality of Bahia, Brazil

Coordinates: 14°21′46″S 40°12′28″W

- Municipality
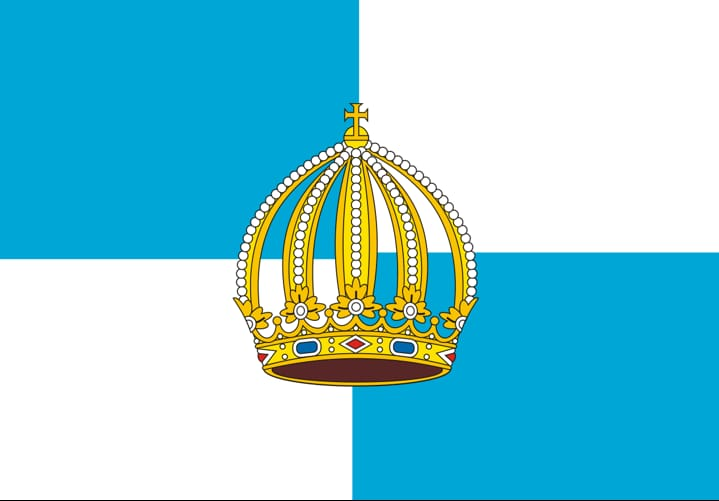
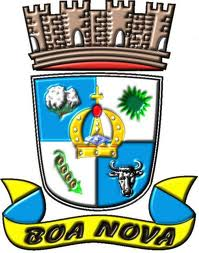
- Flag Coat of arms

- Location in Bahia
- Country: Brazil
- Region: Nordeste
- State: Bahia

Population (2020)
  - Total: 12,329
- Time zone: UTC−3 (BRT)

Boa Nova is a municipality in the state of Bahia in the North-East region of Brazil.

The municipality contains part of the 12,065-hectare (29,810-acre) Boa Nova National Park, established in 2010, a centre for birdwatching. It also contains the 15,024 hectares (37,130 acres) Boa Nova Wildlife Refuge, created at the same time and adjoining the national park.

== See also ==
- List of municipalities in Bahia
