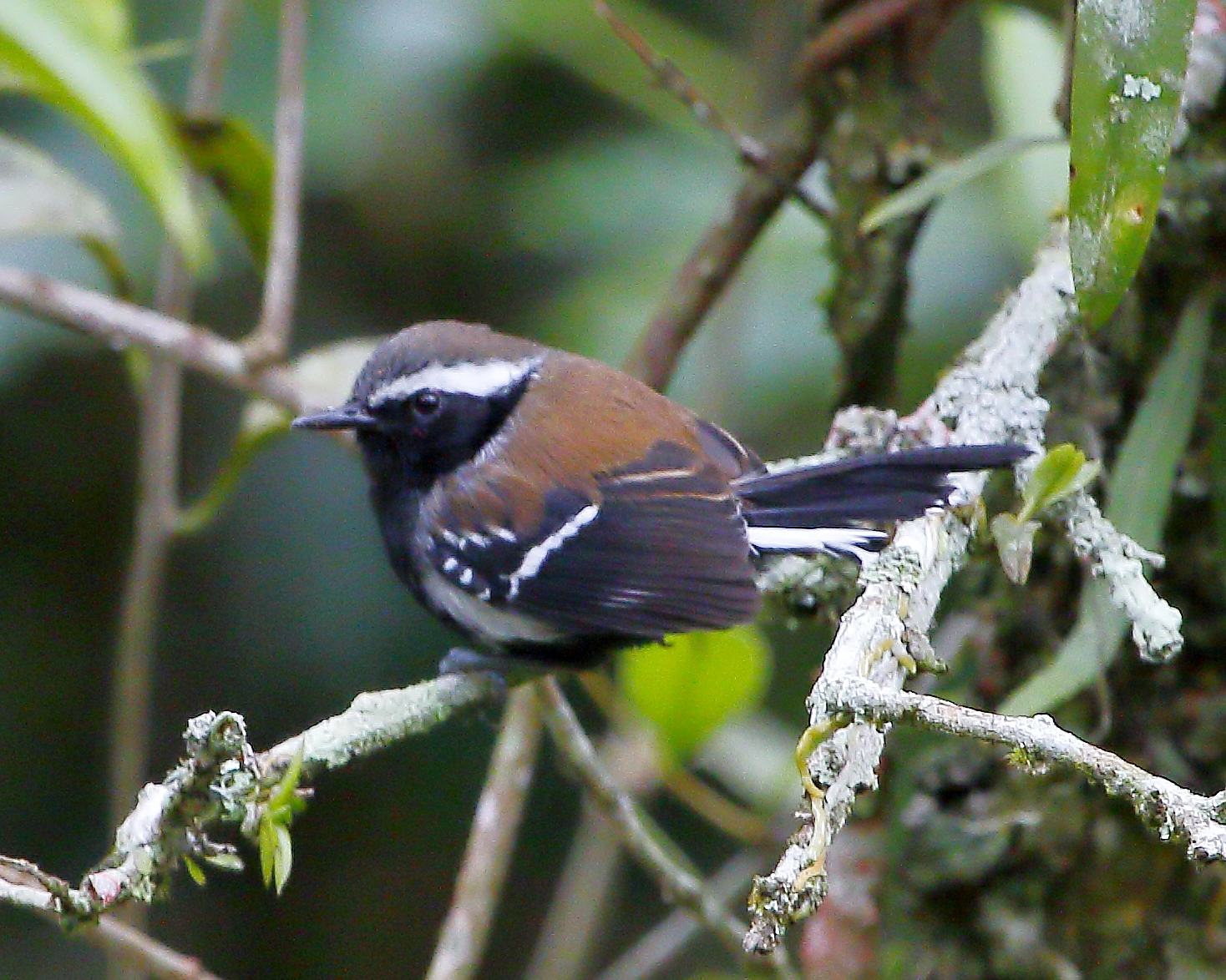

Conservation status
- Least Concern (IUCN 3.1)

Scientific classification
- Kingdom: Animalia
- Phylum: Chordata
- Class: Aves
- Order: Passeriformes
- Family: Thamnophilidae
- Genus: Formicivora
- Species: F. serrana

Binomial name
- Formicivora serrana (Hellmayr, 1929)

= Serra antwren =

Species of bird in Brazil

The serra antwren (Formicivora serrana) is a species of small insectivorous bird in subfamily Thamnophilinae of family Thamnophilidae, the "typical antbirds". It is endemic to southeastern Brazil.

== Taxonomy and systematics ==
The serra antwren has these three subspecies according to worldwide taxonomic systems:

- F. s. serrana (Hellmayr, 1929)
- F. s. interposita Gonzaga & Pacheco, 1990
- F. s. littoralis Gonzaga & Pacheco, 1990

Subspecies F. s. littoralis was originally described as a subspecies of the serra antwren but was later separated as a species, the "restinga antwren". A study published in 2011 showed little or no vocal differences among serrana, interposita, and littoralis and only minor morphological differences between interposita and littoralis. The worldwide taxonomic systems therefore restored littoralis to subspecies status. The South American Classification Committee of the American Ornithological Society retains the serra and restinga antwrens as separate species but is urgently seeking a formal proposal to combine them.

== Description ==
Antwrens in the genus Formicivora have comparatively long tails, and the males are unusual in having underparts that are darker than the upperparts. The serra antwren is 12 to 14 cm (4.7 to 5.5 in) long and weighs 10 to 13 g (0.35 to 0.46 oz). Adult males of the nominate subspecies F. s. serrana have a white supercilium that extends down the neck, along the side of the breast, and widens and grays on the flanks. Their crown and upperparts are rufous-brown with white edges on the outer scapulars and a hidden white patch between them. Their wings are brownish black with white tips on the coverts, blackish bases on the flight feathers, and cinnamon-brown edges on the tertials. Their tail is black with white feather tips that increase in size from the central to the outer feathers. Their face, throat, and underparts are black with white underwing coverts. Adult females have a wide black band through the eye and their underparts are entirely creamy white.

Males of subspecies F. s. interposita and F. s. littoralis differ significantly from nominate males. Males of F. s. interposita have very dark brown to black upperparts, with a narrow and broken white supercilium, very small white tips on the wing coverts, and no white on the underparts. Males of F. s. littoralis also have very dark brown to black upperparts, with little or no supercilium, almost no white on the tail, no white on the underparts, and smaller white tips on the flight feathers than either of the other two subspecies. Females of subspecies F. s. interposita and F. s. littoralis are almost identical to each other. They differ only slightly from the female F. s. serrana by having pale buff (rather than creamy white) underparts.

== Gallery ==
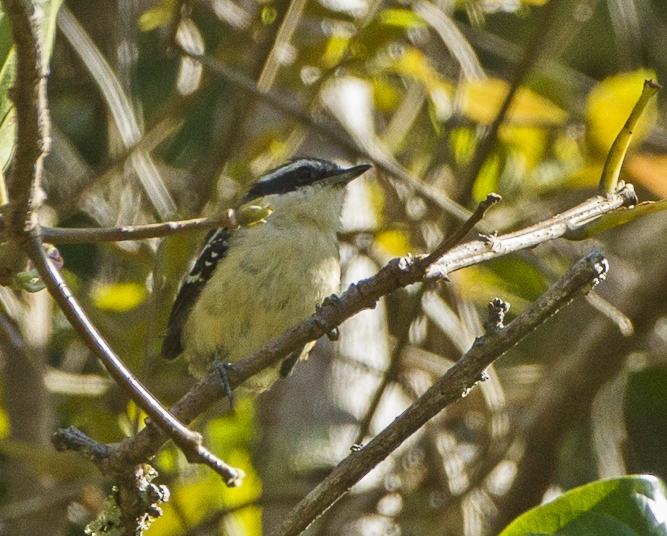
female interposita

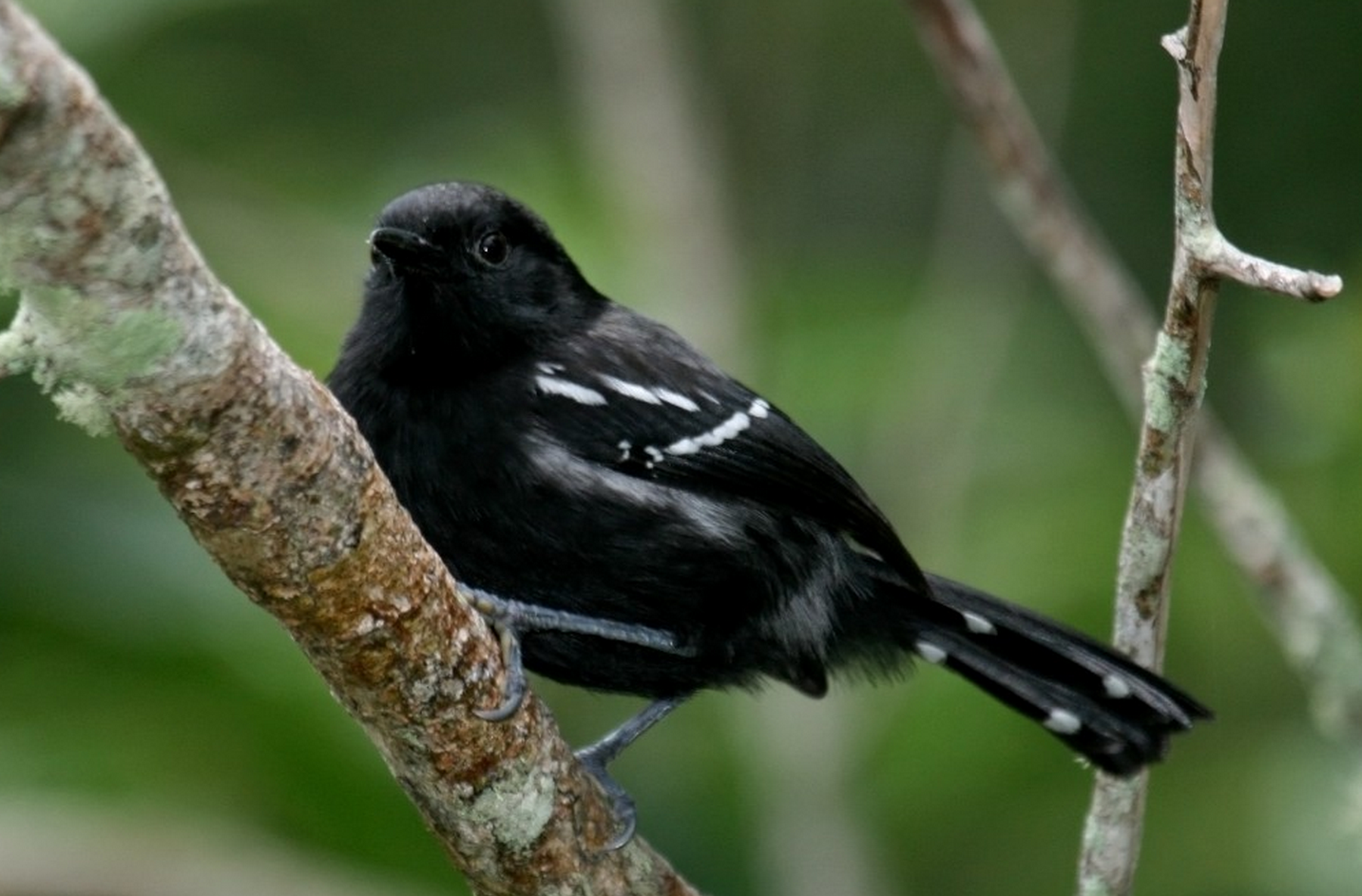
male littoralis

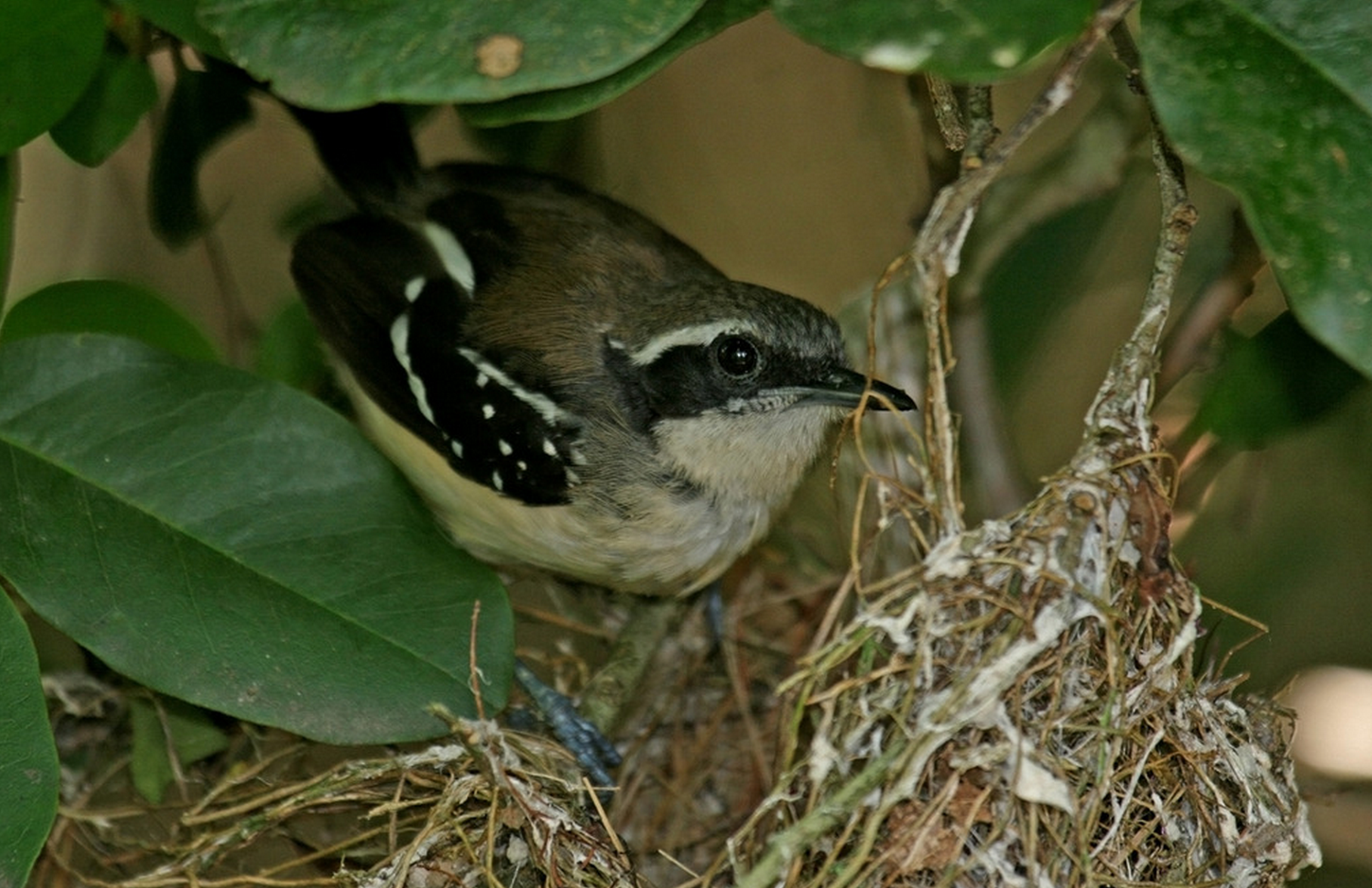
female littoralis

== Distribution and habitat ==
The subspecies of the serra antwren are found thus:

- F. s. serrana: eastern Minas Gerais to central Espírito Santo (but see below)
- F. s. interposita: Paraíba do Sul valley in far southeastern Minas Gerais and northwestern Rio de Janeiro state
- F. s. littoralis: separately from the other two subspecies in coastal Rio de Janeiro state including nearshore islands

A 2011 survey collected individuals of F. s. serrana in northern Espírito Santo, extending that subspecies' range some 200 km (120 mi) farther north than previously known. Whether these birds represent a separate population or are part of a somewhat continuous distribution wherever suitable habitat exists is unclear.

Subspecies F. s. serrana and F. s. interposita inhabit the understorey at the edges of semi-humid evergreen forest, secondary woodland, and drier scrublands. F. s. serrana especially favors stunted forest on poor rocky soils up to 1,550 m (5,100 ft) above sea level. F. s. interposita especially favors secondary woodland near the Paraíba do Sul and in nearby foothills; it reaches only 700 m (2,300 ft) in elevation. Both subspecies have colonized Eucalyptus plantations in Minas Gerais. Subspecies F. s. littoralis occurs only in restinga, a biome on the sandy coastal plain characterized by dense scrub, cacti, and bromeliads.

== Behavior ==
=== Movement ===
The serra antwren is believed to be a year-round resident throughout its range.

=== Feeding ===
The serra antwren's diet has not been detailed but is assumed to include insects, spiders, and other small arthropods. Subspecies F. s. serrana and F. s. interposita typically forage singly, in pairs, or in family groups, and sometimes as part of a mixed-species feeding flock. They usually forage about 1 to 2 m (3 to 7 ft) above the ground, but will feed on the ground and as high as 4 m (13 ft) above it. They forage actively in dense vegetation, taking most prey by gleaning while perched from live leaves, vines, branches, and stems. They sometimes make short jumps from a perch to reach the underside of leaves. The foraging behavior of F. s. littoralis is little known; it does glean prey while perched.

=== Breeding ===
Subspecies F. s. littoralis of the serra antwren builds a cup nest of dry leaves, bark, fine fibers (especially from cactus), and spiderweb in a branch fork, typically within about 3.5 m (11 ft) of the ground. The clutch size is two eggs. Nothing else is known about its breeding biology, and nothing is known about that of the other two subspecies.

=== Vocalization ===
The vocalizations of the three subspecies of serra antwren differ little. Their song is a "monotonous series of dry chup notes at same pitch and pace" that may be sung as many as 50 times in succession though sometimes with short pauses. They also make a "short downslurred nasal whine...up to 20 notes" and a "high-pitched squeaky disyllabic kee-ip note...singly, repeated at long intervals, or in short bursts of a few notes". Both sexes sing, with no known differences between them, and usually in the morning.

== Status ==
The IUCN assessed the serra antwren as being of Least Concern. It has a large range. Its population size is not known and is believed to be decreasing. No immediate threats have been identified. The two inland subspecies are considered locally fairly common, and the nominate subspecies occurs in two national parks. "[Their] ability to occupy second-growth woodland and scrub may make [them] less susceptible to disturbance than true forest birds". When coastal subspecies F. s. littoralis was treated as a species, the IUCN first assessed it as Critically Endangered and then as Endangered. "Habitat loss is the main threat to this taxon, whose habitat is highly fragmented and subjected to ongoing anthropogenic pressures." Brazilian authorities consider it Endangered.
