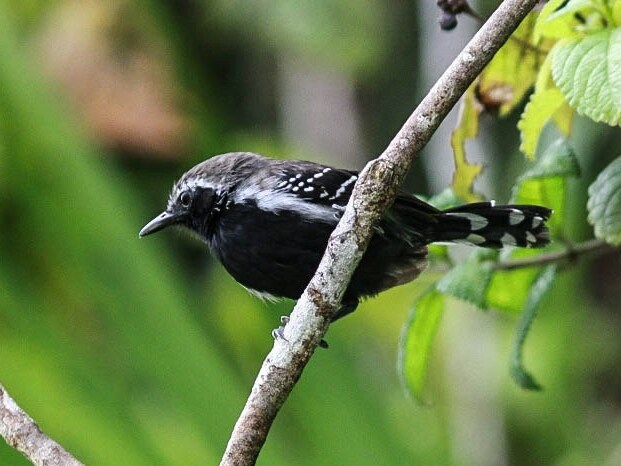
- Southern white-fringed antwren (Formicivora grisea)

Scientific classification
- Kingdom: Animalia
- Phylum: Chordata
- Class: Aves
- Order: Passeriformes
- Family: Thamnophilidae
- Genus: Formicivora; Swainson, 1824

Type species
- Formicivora nigricollis Swainson, 1825

Species
- see text.

= Formicivora =

Genus of birds

Formicivora is a genus of insectivorous birds in the antbird family, Thamnophilidae. These relatively small, long-tailed antbirds are strongly sexually dichromatic. They are found in semi-open habitats in woodland and shrub in South America. They have several rows of white spots on the wings. Males are usually darker below than they are above, and sometimes have a fringe of white on the side.

The genus Formicivora was introduced by the English naturalist William Swainson in 1824. The type species is the southern white-fringed antwren. The name of the genus Formicivora combines the Latin words formica for "ant" and -vorus "eating" from vorare "to devour".

The Sincorá antwren was first described in 2007. While initially placed in its own genus Stymphalornis, the marsh antwren belongs in Formicivora. In contrast, the black-hooded antwren is not closely related to other Formicivora and may be better placed in its own genus.

There are nine species:

Image	Common name	Scientific name	Distribution
	Narrow-billed antwren	Formicivora iheringi	northern Atlantic Forest
	Black-hooded antwren	Formicivora erythronotos	southern Atlantic Forest
	Southern white-fringed antwren	Formicivora grisea	northern South America
	Northern white-fringed antwren	Formicivora intermedia	Colombia and Venezuela
	Serra antwren	Formicivora serrana	mid Atlantic Forest
	Black-bellied antwren	Formicivora melanogaster	Brazil and eastern Bolivia
	Rusty-backed antwren	Formicivora rufa	Brazil, eastern Bolivia and southern Amazonia
	Sincorá antwren	Formicivora grantsaui	Serra do Espinhaço
	Marsh antwren	Formicivora acutirostris	southern Atlantic Forest
