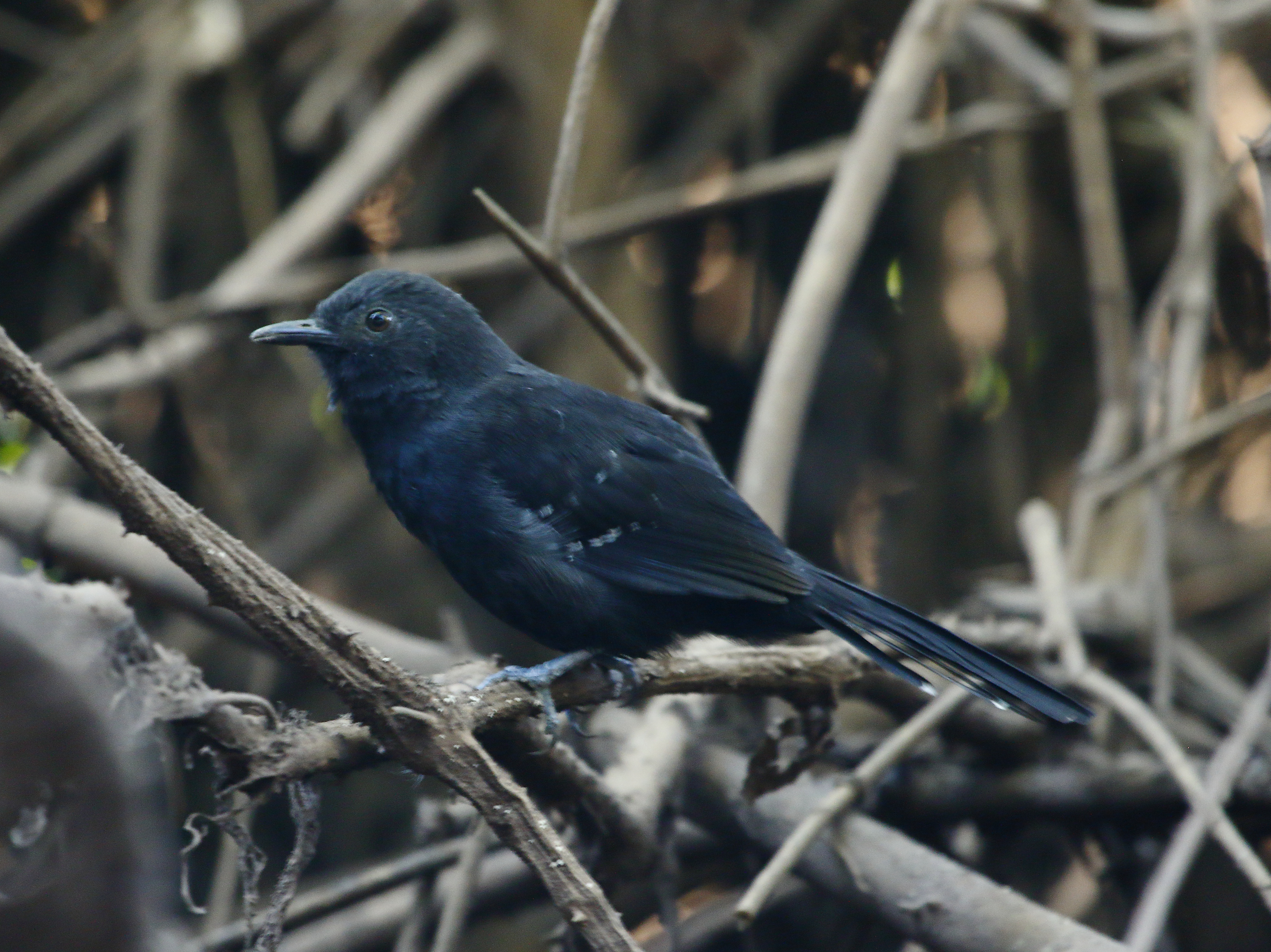

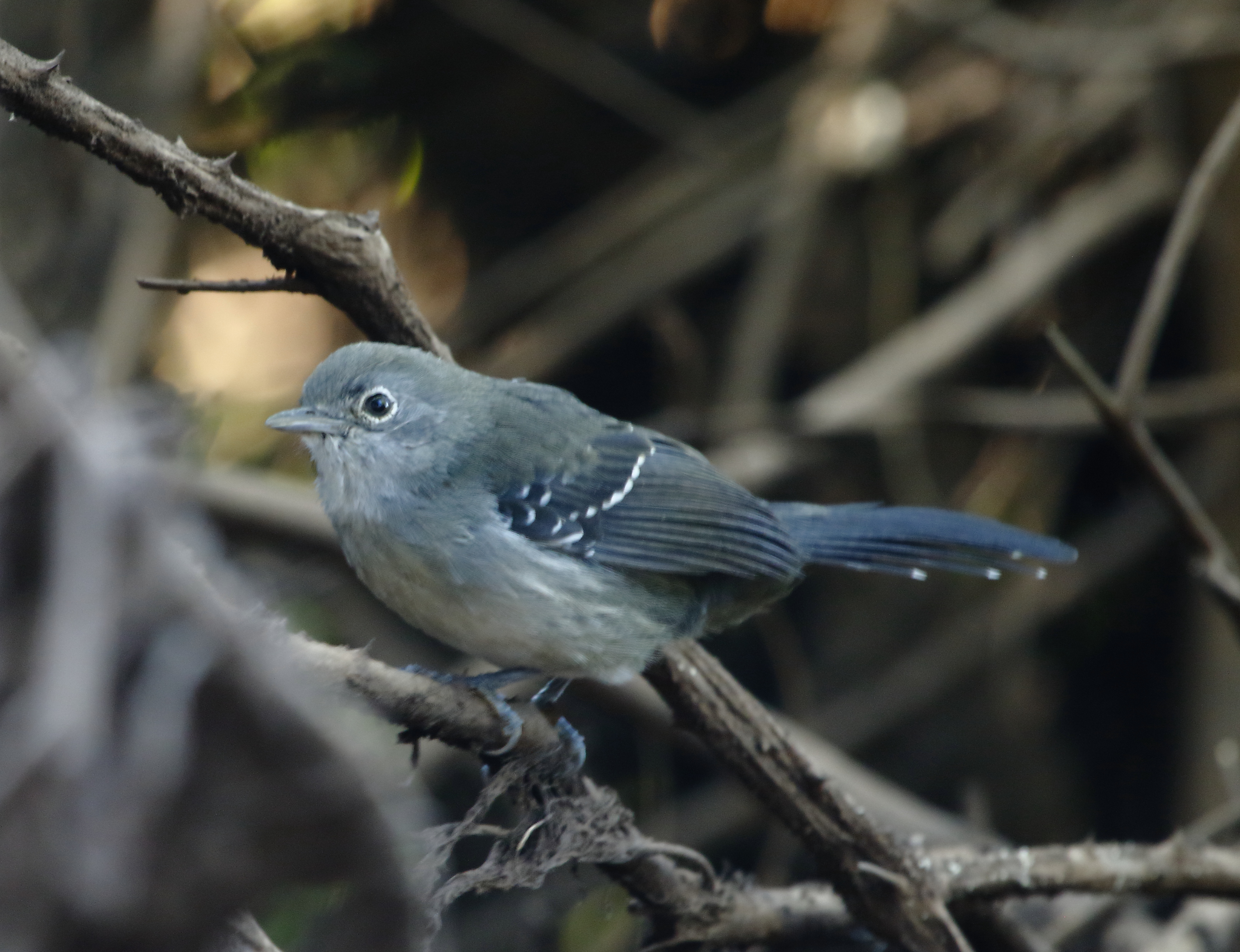
- Male above, female below

Conservation status
- Least Concern (IUCN 3.1)

Scientific classification
- Kingdom: Animalia
- Phylum: Chordata
- Class: Aves
- Order: Passeriformes
- Family: Thamnophilidae
- Genus: Cercomacra
- Species: C. melanaria

Binomial name
- Cercomacra melanaria (Ménétriés, 1835)

= Mato Grosso antbird =

Species of bird

The Mato Grosso antbird (Cercomacra melanaria) is a species of bird in subfamily Thamnophilinae of family Thamnophilidae, the "typical antbirds". It is found in Bolivia, Brazil, and Paraguay.

== Taxonomy and systematics ==
The Mato Grosso antbird was formally described in 1835 by the French zoologist Édouard Ménétries under the binomial name Formicivora melanaria. The specific epithet is from Latin melania meaning "blackness". The type locality is the town of Cuiabá in the Brazilian state of Mato Grosso. This antbird is now placed in the genus Cercomacra that was introduced by the English zoologist Philip Sclater in 1858. The species is monotypic: No subspecies are recognized.

A 2014 study confirmed what had been earlier suggested, that the Mato Grosso antbird and the bananal (C. ferdinandi), Rio Branco (C. carbonaria), and jet (C. nigricans) antbirds form a clade within genus Cercomacra.

== Description ==
The Mato Grosso antbird is 16 to 16.5 cm (6.3 to 6.5 in) long and weighs 18.5 to 19.5 g (0.65 to 0.69 oz). Adult males are almost entirely black, with white edges on their outer scapulars, a white patch between them, and a hidden white patch under them. Their wing coverts and tail feathers have white tips and their flight feathers have white inner edges. Females have an olive-grey head and upperparts with a white interscapular patch. Their wings and tail are dark gray; their wing coverts and tail feathers have white tips. Their underparts are pale olive-gray that is whiter on their throat and the center of their breast.

== Distribution and habitat ==
The Mato Grosso antbird has a disjunct distribution. One population is found in the central Bolivian departments of Beni and Cochabamba. Another is found from far eastern Santa Cruz Department in Bolivia south into extreme northern Paraguay and east into south-central Brazil's Mato Grosso and Mato Grosso do Sul states. It primarily inhabits gallery forest, tropical deciduous forest, and seasonally flooded savanna woodlands, in most cases near water. Within them it heavily favors areas whose understorey is dense with tangles of vines. In addition, part of the central Bolivian population occurs in dry Chaco forest. In elevation it is found up to 800 m (2,600 ft).

== Behavior ==
=== Movement ===
The Mato Grosso antbird is believed to be a year-round resident throughout its range.

=== Feeding ===
The Mato Grosso antbird's diet has not been detailed but is known to be insects and spiders. Individuals, pairs, and family groups usually forage from the ground up to about 3 m (10 ft) above it, though occasionally as high as 8 m (25 ft). They hop and flutter-fly among vine tangles and other dense vegetation and usually take prey by gleaning and lunging from a perch. They sometimes briefly join mixed-species feeding flocks that pass through their territory. They are not known to follow army ants.

=== Breeding ===
The Mato Grosso antbird's breeding season has not been fully defined but includes October and November. Its nest is a cup made of fine fibers and dried leaves held to a branch with spider web up to about 4.5 m (15 ft) above the ground. The clutch size is two eggs. The incubation period is about 14 days and fledging occurs 8 to 11 days after hatch. Both parents build the nest, incubate the eggs, and provision the nestlings.

=== Vocalization ===
The male Mato Grosso antbird's song is a "[v]ery low, very dry, froglike 'krokreéeh-tjow' " that is often answered by the female's "high, strident 'chip-chip- -' ".

== Status ==
The IUCN has assessed the Mato Grosso antbird as being of Least Concern. It has a large range; its population size is not known and is believed to be decreasing. No immediate threats have been identified. It is considered locally common, especially in the Pantanal of Brazil and Bolivia. "Only part of Pantanal is formally protected, but nature of seasonal flooding cycles in region provides some natural buffer to human disturbance. A number of proposed hydro-electric schemes, if instituted, could pose significant threat to the general ecosystem of the Brazilian Pantanal."
