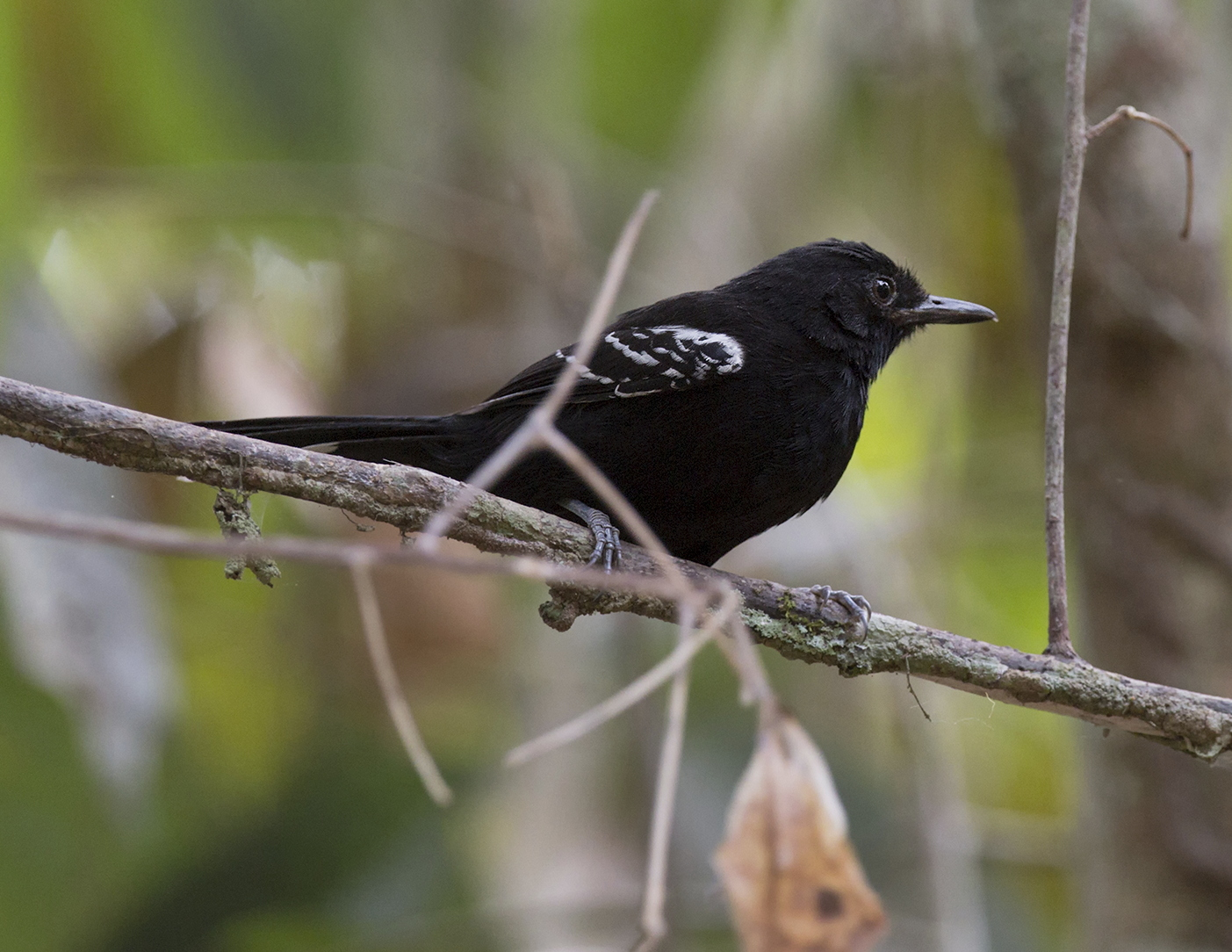
- male at Canguçu Ecological Reserve, Pium, Tocantins state, Brazil

Conservation status
- Near Threatened (IUCN 3.1)

Scientific classification
- Kingdom: Animalia
- Phylum: Chordata
- Class: Aves
- Order: Passeriformes
- Family: Thamnophilidae
- Genus: Cercomacra
- Species: C. ferdinandi

Binomial name
- Cercomacra ferdinandi Snethlage, 1928

= Bananal antbird =

Species of bird in Brazil

The Bananal antbird (Cercomacra ferdinandi) is a Near Threatened species of bird in subfamily Thamnophilinae of family Thamnophilidae, the "typical antbirds". It is endemic to central Brazil.

== Taxonomy and systematics ==
The Bananal antbird is monotypic. A 2014 study confirmed what had been earlier suggested, that the Bananal antbird and the Mato Grosso (C. melanaria), Rio Branco (C. carbonaria), and jet (C. nigricans) antbirds form a clade within genus Cercomacra.

== Description ==
The Bananal antbird is 16 cm (6.3 in) long; one individual weighed 15 g (0.53 oz). Adult males are almost entirely black, with white edges on their outer scapulars, a white patch between them, and a hidden white patch under them. Their wing coverts and tail feathers have white tips and their flight feathers have white inner edges. Females are mostly gray, with white in the same places as the male and thin white streaks on their throat and breast.

== Distribution and habitat ==
The Bananal antbird is found along the Araguaia and Tocantins rivers and some of their tributaries in central Amazonian Brazil. Its range is centered on the large Ilha do Bananal in the Araguaia. Its range extends from northwestern Goiás and eastern Mato Grosso north through western Tocantins into southeastern Pará and western Maranhão. The species inhabits gallery forest and nearby mature secondary forest that is also near water such as oxbow lakes. It occurs almost entirely in vine tangles and other dense vegetation from the understorey to the mid-storey.

== Behavior ==
=== Movement ===
The Bananal antbird is believed to be a year-round resident throughout its range.

=== Feeding ===
The Bananal antbird's diet has not been detailed but is known to be insects and probably includes spiders. Individuals, pairs, and family groups usually forage between about 3 and 15 m (10 and 50 ft) above the ground, but also regularly pursue prey to the ground. They seldom join mixed-species feeding flocks.

=== Breeding ===
The Bananal antbird breeds between May and July. Nothing else is known about its breeding biology.

=== Vocalization ===
The Bananal antbird's song is a "hurried, squeaky 'tudr-tudr-tudr' " that is "randomly combined" with the "very fast, very high 'wididi' " call.

== Status ==
The IUCN originally in 2004 assessed the Bananal antbird as Vulnerable and in 2020 downlisted it to Near Threatened. It has a limited range and its estimated population of between 15,000 and 350,000 mature individuals is believed to be decreasing. "Its specialised habitat requirements make the species susceptible to changes in hydrological management. The greatest threat to the species is the development of hydroelectrocity projects (HPP), which are likely to flood large parts of the species's [sic] habitat." One such project has been completed and others are planned or are under construction. The species is "apparently fairly common within its highly restricted range" and has extended its range southward since the turn of the twenty-first century. Its range includes Araguaia National Park.
