= Birds of the Amazon =

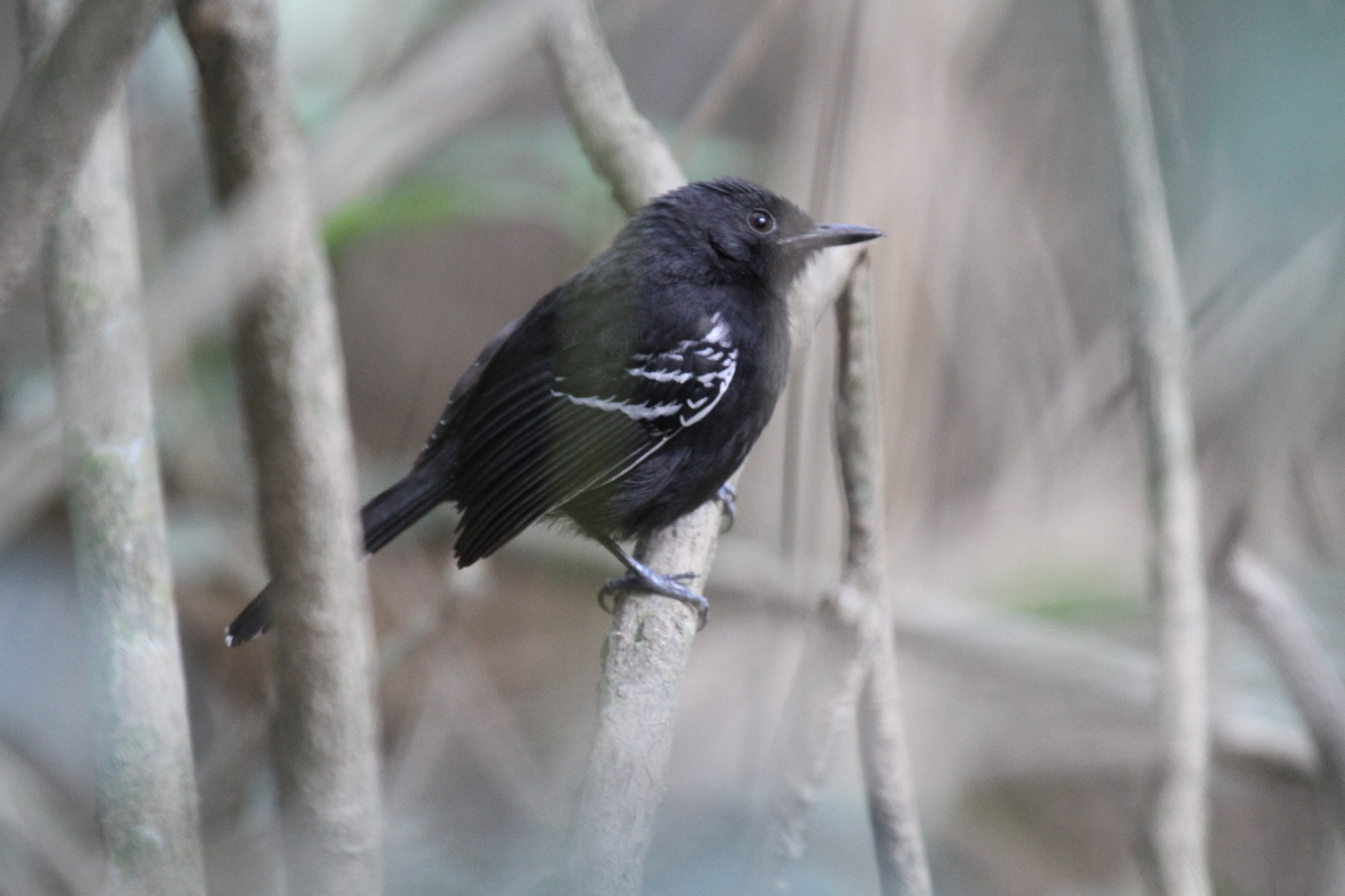
Rio Branco antbird, a vulnerable bird endemic to the Amazon.

An immense number of bird species live in the Amazon rainforest and river basin (an area which is nominally home to one out of every ten known species of animal). Over 1,300 of these species are types of birds, which accounts for one-third of all bird species in South America. The diets of rainforest birds greatly differ between species, although, nuts, fruits and leaves are a common food for many birds in the Amazon. Birds migrate to the Amazon rainforest from the North or South. Amazon birds are threatened by deforestation since they primarily reside in the treetops. At its current rate of destruction, the rainforest will be gone in forty years. Human encroachment also negatively affects the habitat of many Amazonian birds. Agriculture and road clearings limits the habitable areas. Birds in the Amazon are distinguished by which layer of the rainforest they reside in. Each layer or community has unique plants, animals and ecosystems. Birds interact with other animals in their community through the food chain, competition, mating, altruism and symbiosis.

== Habitat ==
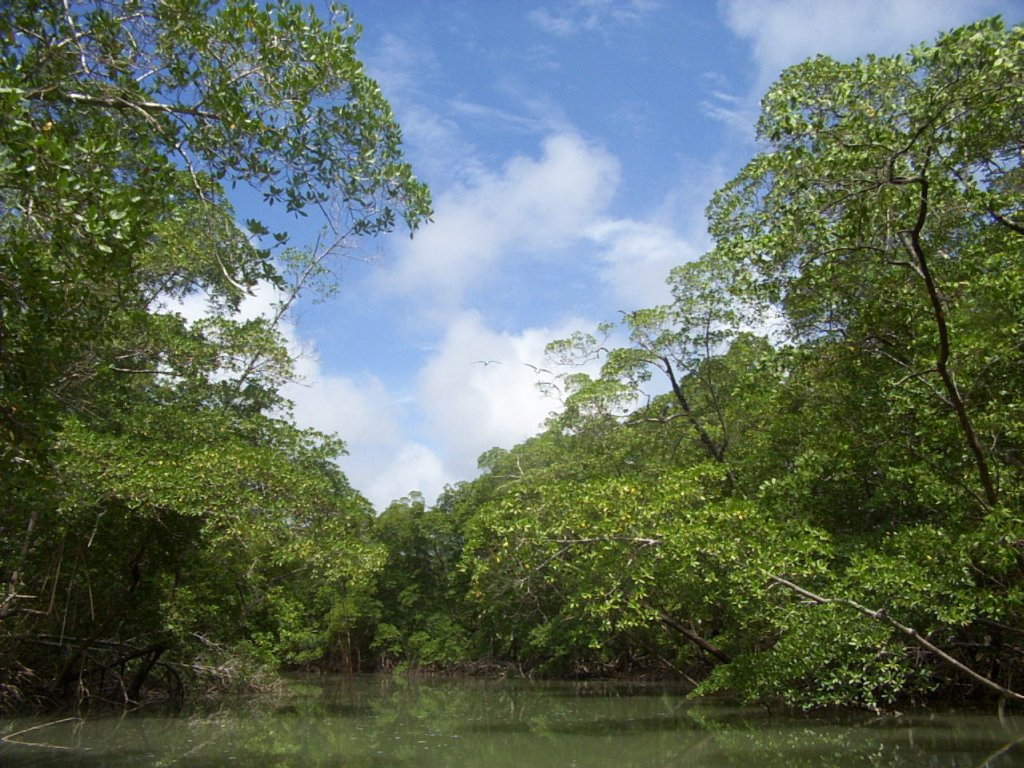
Amazon rainforest

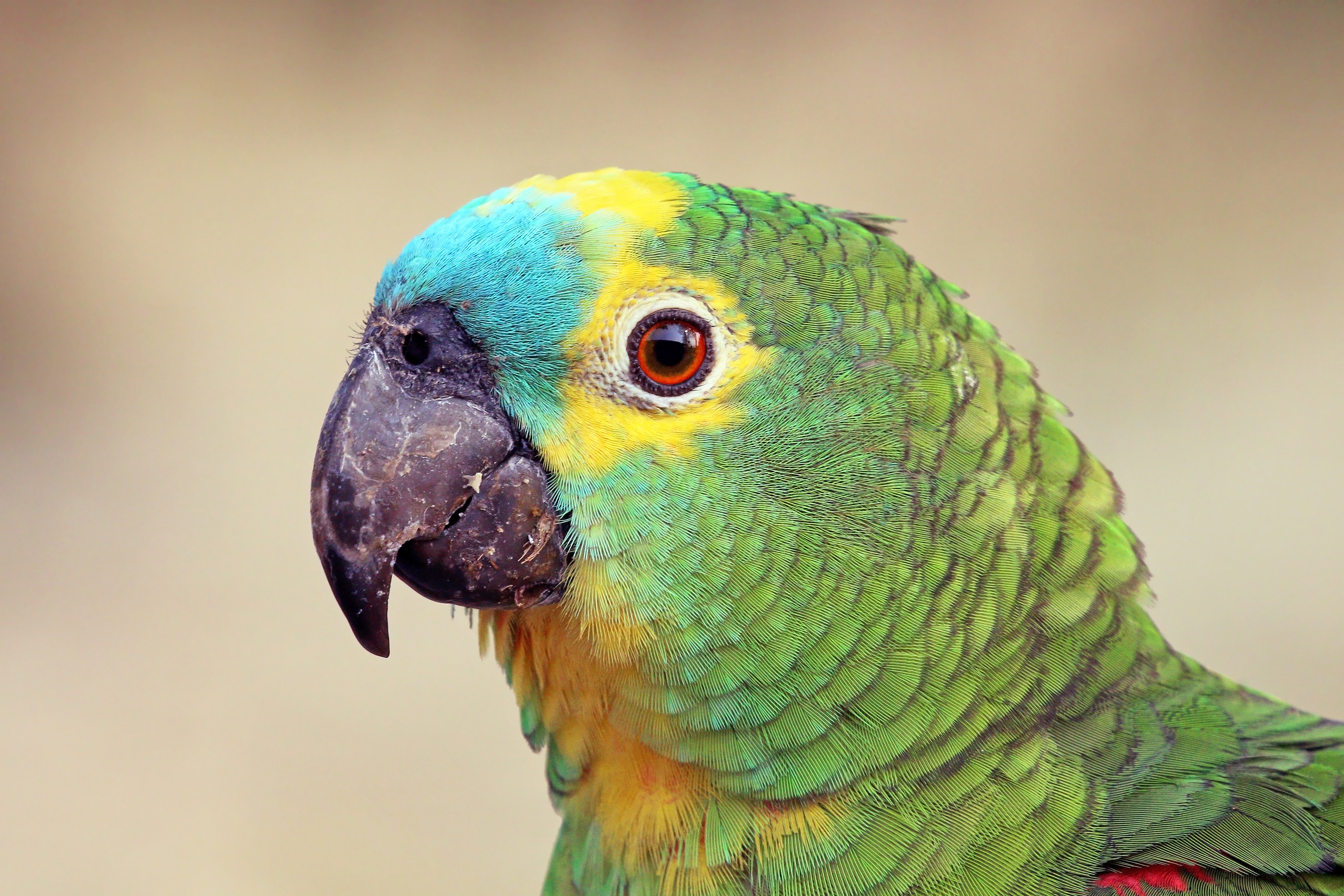
Blue-fronted amazon

The Amazon rainforest has four layers, each of which has its own unique ecosystem. The top layer is the emergent (or dominants) where the tallest trees are found (up to 200 feet tall). Many birds, such as eagles and parrots, also reside in the emergent. The primary layer is the canopy where about 70 to 90 percent of all rainforest life resides. Plants in this layer have a large amount of fruit, seeds and flowers. Birds such as the toucan live in the canopy. The understory is the next layer where very little sunshine reaches; only about 2 to 15 percent of sunshine reaches the understory. The darkest layer is the forest floor, where most of the larger animals live. With multiple environments, the Amazon rainforest is able to provide a home to thousands of birds with different survival needs. Amazonia is commonly dived into eight areas of endemism (districts): Napo, Imeri, Guiana, Inambari, Rondonia, Tapahos, Xingu and Belem. Although each area is similar in ecological characteristics, their biotas were assembled differently.

== Habitat destruction ==
With the progressive destruction of the rainforest comes a loss of habitats for many species of birds. As of 2016, over twenty percent of the original Amazon rainforest was lost, mostly as a result of deforestation and human encroachment. Human-made clearing has had important effects on bird species. Two to four million hectares are being cleared each year by large-scale clearings for various reasons including the construction of roads, power lines, hydroelectric projects, mining site development and government colonization programs. Deforestation, road clearings, lodging and agriculture are all related causes of the destruction of Amazonian birds' habitat.

=== Deforestation ===
Deforestation of the Amazon rainforest
Year	Deforested area	Accumulated loss
2005	19,014 km^{2} (7,341 mi^{2})	332,470 km^{2} (128,370 mi^{2})
2006	14,286 km^{2} (5,516 mi^{2})	346,756 km^{2} (133,883 mi^{2})
2007	11,651 km^{2} (4,498 mi^{2})	358,407 km^{2} (138,382 mi^{2})
2008	12,911 km^{2} (4,985 mi^{2})	371,318 km^{2} (143,367 mi^{2})
2009	7,464 km^{2} (2,882 mi^{2})	378,782 km^{2} (146,249 mi^{2})
2010	7,000 km^{2} (2,700 mi^{2})	385,782 km^{2} (148,951 mi^{2})
2011	6,418 km^{2} (2,478 mi^{2})	392,200 km^{2} (151,400 mi^{2})
2012	4,571 km^{2} (1,765 mi^{2})	396,771 km^{2} (153,194 mi^{2})
2013	5,891 km^{2} (2,275 mi^{2})	402,662 km^{2} (155,469 mi^{2})
2014	4,848 km^{2} (1,872 mi^{2})	407,510 km^{2} (157,340 mi^{2})

Deforestation of the Amazon rainforest is a continually growing problem which affects all animals and a major threat to migrating birds because it changes or removes sections of ecosystems and habitats. Birds may discover that the rainforest they flew to last year is seriously damaged or no longer exists. This is common for many birds that breed in the northern and southern hemisphere but migrate to the Amazon rainforest for food and shelter that are not available at their breeding places during cold months. Migrating birds greatly rely on rainforests for food, rest and recovery after their dangerous migration during which they can lose 30% of their body weight.

Since the 1970s, cattle pasture has been the leading cause of deforestation in the Brazilian Amazon. Land is often cleared for investment purposes due to pastureland prices exceeding forest land prices. In this case, large amounts of forest are torn down and replaced with savanna grasses for cattle feeding. This situation is continually becoming worse as Brazil grows as a producer of beef. Poor farmers are encouraged to settle on rainforest lands by government land policies in Brazil. The process of clearing land includes removing the understory shrubbery and then cutting down the trees. After the area has been left to dry for a few months, the rest is burned. Once the land is cleared, it can be used to plant crops. However, the productivity of the soil declines after a year or two of farming. When this occurs, farmers clear new forest for more short-term agricultural land.

=== Road clearings and logging ===
Logging in the Amazon is controlled by strict licensing. Timber is only allowed to be harvested in specific areas. However, these rules are not always followed and timber is illegally cut down every year. Logging is closely related with road clearings. Areas that have been selectively logged are eight times more likely to be settled and cleared than untouched rainforest areas. Roads that are created for access to lodging give people better access to rainforests. This enables further use of natural rainforest materials for agricultural lands, fuel, building material and more. The creation of roads and logging deters birds and other animals from living in those sections of the forest. It can be observed that there is a lot less bird movement near areas with roads and lodging than those without. Understory species are especially vulnerable to effects of road clearing. Even roads that are narrow with less traffic can have a significant impact on the movements of insectivorous birds in the Amazon.
