= Secrecy, Power and Ignorance Research Network =

The Secrecy, Power and Ignorance research Network (SPIN) is a collaborative research network, initially founded in 2019. The Defence Research Network describes SPIN as an academic collaboration. Now comprising scholars based across the UK, Europe and North America, SPIN's central aim is to support secrecy research across and between disciplines and to nurture Secrecy Studies as a unique and important area of research. SPIN academics have had their work on secrecy and ignorance profiled in national and international media, including coverage in The Guardian, BBC Radio, and contributions to The Conversation, by members such as Brian Rappert, Linsey McGoey, Edmund Clark, Luca Trenta, Clare Birchall, and Elspeth Van Veeren.

The work of this network builds on and contributes to a growing international community of Secrecy Studies scholars. Secrecy Studies work can be found in the pages of Secrecy & Society journal, established by Dr. Susan Maret in 2016 as well as in key sources including Secrecy and Silence in the Research Process, The Routledge Handbook of Religion and Secrecy, Secrecy and Methods in Security Research: A Guide to Qualitative Fieldwork, and is associated with a range of topics from the secret ballot, postal secrecy, and Non-disclosure agreements to romantic secrecy and honey trapping, and a wider field that engages with the Sociological aspects of secrecy and organisational secrecy.

== History ==
SPIN originated from a collaboration between scholars at the University of Exeter, University of Cardiff, and the University of Bristol, initially supported by a GW4 Initiator Grant in 2018.

Since its founding, SPIN has expanded its focus and disciplinary base significantly, integrating scholars from a wider range of disciplines and subject areas, including Art, English Literature, Criminology, Cultural Studies, History, Law, Organisational Studies, Political Theory, Psychology, and Sociology, and growing to include scholars from across the UK, Europe and North America.

SPIN's work with non-academic partners includes projects with the science centre We the Curious, and collaborating with the Martin Parr Foundation to commission new lens-based work on the theme of secrecy producing work by Olu Osinoiki Emily Graham, and Ashutosh Shaktan. Additional information on the photographic commissions created in partnership with the Martin Parr Foundation is documented by FastForward Photography. SPIN's public engagement work also includes collaborations with Compass Presents, such as The Confession Booth installation. SPIN is also listed as a recommended resource in the University of Essex Sociology Theory Guide, and is featured in a project profile hosted by the University of Leeds Centre for Security Studies.

== Theoretical foundations and contributions ==
SPIN's theoretical foundations centre on a structural approach to secrecy (i.e. ‘structural secrecy’) and its interconnections with ignorance and other ways of ‘unknowing’. Bridging sociology of secrecy (broadly culture-centred) and political secrecy (agent-centred) traditions, SPIN's work moves away from a focus on secrets and on individual and isolated ‘acts of information control’ as defined by Sisella Bok, to focus on patterned social, cultural and political processes and how these shape specific political moments and encounters. A core theoretical contribution of SPIN is therefore its framing of secrecy as a relational and interactive phenomenon. Rather than treating secrecy as a tool wielded selectively by powerful actors or by victims seeking to avoid violence or scandal, SPIN analyses how secrecy as a logic emerges through exchanges between a variety of actors.

=== Key concepts and projects ===
==== Secrecy games ====
‘‘Secrecy games’’ describes the patterned encounters through which actors negotiate what is revealed and what is withheld. Through secrecy games, such as hide and seek, camouflage, tunnelling, maze-making, and redaction, secrecy practices that play out often between state and non-state resistant actors, our understanding and relationship to secrecy, as well as the practices change over time. Secrecy games illustrate, "the more varied ways that secrecy operates and the ways non-state actors use secrecy and shape its effects". This concept was developed by Elspeth Van Veeren, Clare Stevens and Amaha Senu.

==== Exposure versus revelation ====
A core commitment of SPIN is to trouble the binaries of secrecy/transparency, known/unknown. To do this, SPIN contributions move away from an assumption that once information is in the public domain it is ‘known’ and can have political effects. For instance, Dr. Lisa Stampnitzky has differentiated “exposure’’ (the act of making information publicly available) from revelation (the collective recognition that an exposure has changed what is publicly known). Exposure can be regarded as an initial "switch", even though its impact depends on interpretive processes. Revelation in contrast is the moment when released information becomes socially acknowledged as significant, indicating a shift from disclosure to shared understanding. Prof. Brian Rappert has examined how revelation is often characterized by movement; for instance, between claims making that affirms-negates, between what is taken as speaking for itself-what needs to be spoken for, between suggestions the world has been laid bare-is still occulted away, as well as the between the claim that things are what they seem-things are not what they seem. His work has sought to understand how our desire to believe in and disregard in what is revealed can together establish emotive and epistemic significance of revelation. This distinction between secrecy, exposure and revelation has been championed by Dr. Lisa Stampnitzky and Prof. Brian Rappert, including within Revelations: A Sociology of Uncovering, published with Routledge.

==== Secrecy as identity forming ====
Within SPIN, secrecy is not a neutral ‘tool’ but cannot be separated from identities: certain identities have come to be ‘naturally’ more associated with acceptable for unacceptable secrecy, for example. Secrecy practices also shape the self-awareness of those who use secrecy and who work within secretive institutions through belonging, discipline and expertise linked to secrecy. This includes, for example how gender, sexuality and secrecy work together. This work has been developed within SPIN by Dr. Elspeth Van Veeren and Dr. Natasha Mulvihill and is connected with Mulvihill's ERC and UKRI-funded project Powerful Perpetrators.

==== Secrecy and scandal ====
SPIN also explores the interconnections of secrecy and scandal. Scandals often operates on the logic that the exposure of "guilty secrets" by actors will support their gaining credibility. This framing of scandals often narrows the scope of accountability and limits scrutiny of wider patterns of harm. This work within SPIN is led by Dr. Owen D. Thomas, Dr. Jaimie Johnson, and Dr. Ana Flamind.

==== Conspiracy theories and cultures ====
Conspiracy theories and conspiracy cultures have emerged as a significant feature of modern politics. Understanding the logics of conspiracy theories, how they circulate, and how they are studied is a significant feature of SPIN's work including by SPIN members Prof. Clare Birchall (who has led several EU and UKRI-funded projects), Dr. Tim Aistrope, Dr.Theo Kyndinis and Dr. Elspeth Van Veeren, for example in understanding how 'the red pill' metaphor has come to dominate today's anti-feminist backlash.

==== The visualities of secrecy ====
Despite the assumption that secrecy is principally a practice of negation and erasure, secrecy has a visual dimension and even a 'language'. As SPIN colleagues suggest, what do we imagine when we imagine secrecy? This includes studying the visual language and practices of visual negation, erasure and redaction, of the 'allure of secrecy', of the worlds of secrecy (the visual language of spy fiction for example), and the visualities of conspiracy cultures. This strand of work is associated with the work of Edmund Clark, Vera Zurbrugge, Robert Luzar, Elspeth Van Veeren, Tim Aistrope, Max Coulson, and Lewis Bush. Photographer Edmund Clark has also contributed to SPIN's visual work, advertising his presentation of the project Cosmopolemos at the SPIN colloquium in 2024.

==== Secrecy and technology ====
Drawing on Science and Technology studies, SPIN colleagues investigate how secrecy is embedded in technological infrastructures (historical and current) as well as how technology and technological systems are the product of secrecy politics. This strand of research is led by Clare Stevens.

=== Additional research projects ===
Members of SPIN also conduct research and produce publications and associated public engagement activities on: on Bureaucratic and archival secrecy in terms of the limits of freedom-of-information regimes, the politics of redaction, and of the administrative barriers that shape public access to state archives; on state use of secrecy for foreign policy, such as targeted killing; on state-community relations, ignorance and secrecy, including in relation to social and economic inequality; and on corporate secrecy and strategic ignorance, for example in relation to climate-related obfuscation and how governments, corporations and lobby groups manage information about environmental harm, how climate data is selectively framed, and how misinformation circulates through public debate. Many of SPIN members' projects have received UKRI funding, including supporting research on secrecy and sound, and on strategic ignorance and the UK criminal justice system.

=== Research outputs ===
Alongside supporting individual projects and the academic papers, SPIN's collective project work and main themes has led to the publication of two peer-reviewed publications including:

- 'Being Curious With Secrecy' in 'Secrecy & Society' journal based on the We the Curious collaboration Based on SPIN's collaboration with We the Curious, this article examines how secrecy and curiosity work together, especially within a museum space to generate engagement with subjects of scientific and cultural interest.
- "Secrecy Games: Power and Resistance in Global Politics" in The Review of International Studies This article introduces the concept of secrecy games to show how secrecy works as an interaction. It explains how political actors use patterns of concealment, selective revelation and exposure to shape narratives, manage uncertainty and influence power relations. It demonstrates that secrecy is relational, where governments, institutions, activists, publics and other non-state actors respond to one another's moves, creating cycles of shifting acts of disclosure that shape how political struggles unfold.
- Secrecy & Society "Special Issue on Secrecy and Technologies" edited by Clare Stevens and Sam Forsythe
- "Taking the red pill: conspiracy theories, gender, and the “elusive epistemologies” of the “manosphere”" in the International Feminist Journal of Politics on how The Matrix film has been "reinterpreted from a progressive allegory into a key metaphor within anti-feminist manosphere communities. “Red pill” discourse has widely reframed feminist power as conspiracy and legitimized misogynistic violence and the important gender work of conspiracy theories."

=== Editorial contributions ===
SPIN also plays a role in shaping Secrecy Studies as an interdisciplinary field through its editorial work. The network has commissioned two edited volumes: The Routledge Handbook of Secrecy Studies and The Routledge Handbook of Gender and Secrecy. These volumes gather together contributions from international academic, policy, and arts-based authors engaged in furthering understandings of secrecy and of Secrecy Studies.

== Membership ==
SPIN operates as an informal research network and does not have a formal membership application process. Participation varies by project, with individuals joining particular research strands, workshops or publications depending on expertise and interest.

=== Current steering group members ===
- Elspeth Van Veeren (Director)
- Clare Stevens (Steering Group Member and SPIN Lab Director)
- Brian Rappert (Steering Group Member)
- Owen D. Thomas (Steering Group Member)

=== Notable Past and Present Members ===
- Professor Clare Birchall
- British visual artist Edmund Clark
- Dr. Claudia Hillebrand
- Professor Linsey McGoey
- Associate Professor Luca Trenta
- Professor William Walters

== Public activities ==
SPIN hosts public online talks each academic year.

SPIN has a podcast series, with its first episode airing in May 2019.

SPIN has a YouTube channel, launched May 2022 with an interview with Adam Sisman on John LeCarré and his personal relationship to secrecy .

SPIN is also affiliated with SPIN Labs, through which it organises its public engagement activities, headed by Dr. Clare Stevens.
