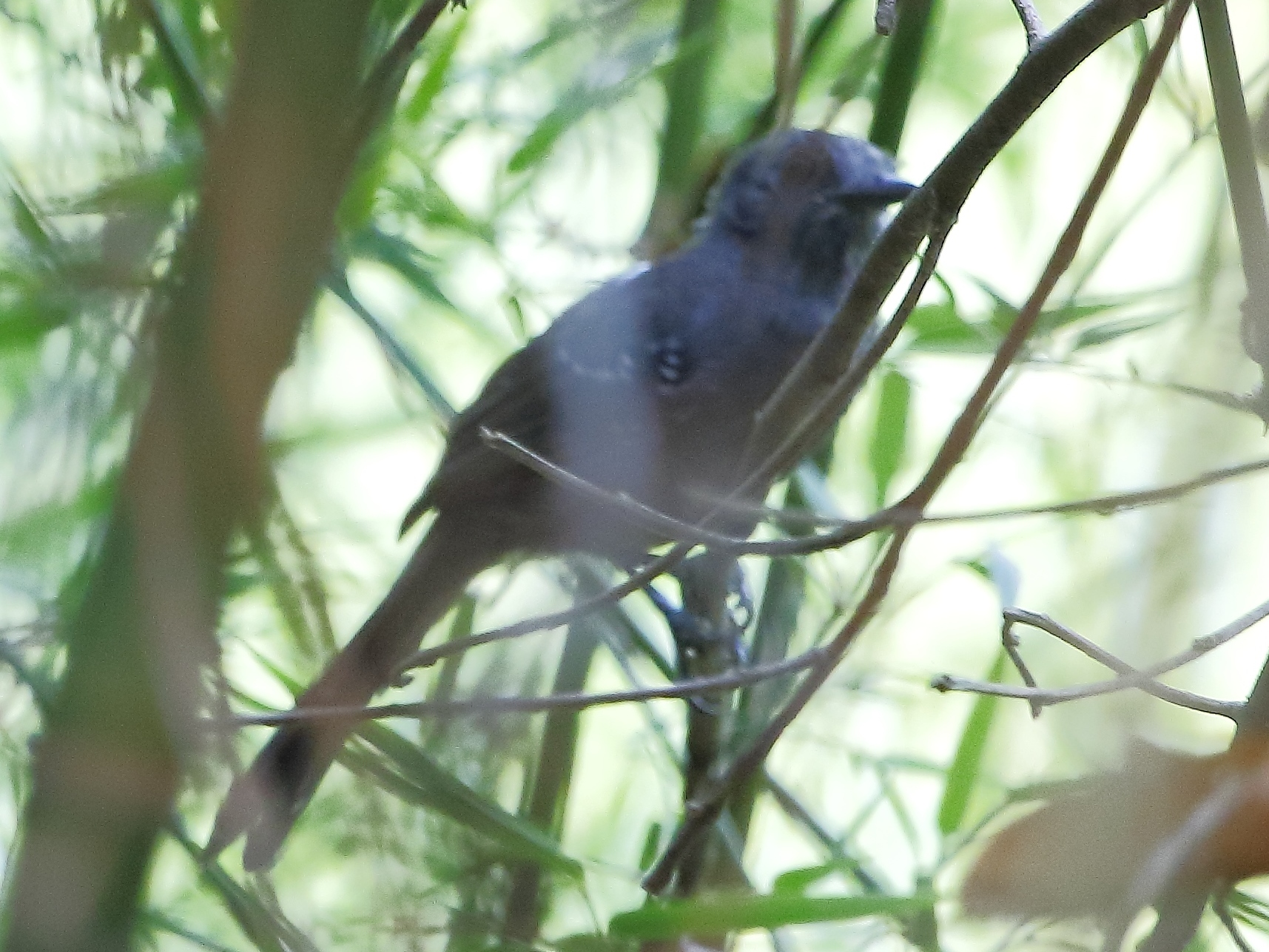

Conservation status
- Least Concern (IUCN 3.1)

Scientific classification
- Kingdom: Animalia
- Phylum: Chordata
- Class: Aves
- Order: Passeriformes
- Family: Thamnophilidae
- Genus: Cercomacra
- Species: C. manu

Binomial name
- Cercomacra manu Fitzpatrick & Willard, 1990

= Manu antbird =

Species of bird

The Manu antbird (Cercomacra manu) is a species of bird in subfamily Thamnophilinae of family Thamnophilidae, the "typical antbirds". It is found in Brazil, Bolivia, and Peru.

== Taxonomy and systematics ==
The type specimen of the Manu antbird was collected in 1980 and was identified as this new species. A specimen collected in the same general region in 1964 was retroactively determined to also be a Manu antbird; it had been thought to be a jet antbird (C. nigricans). Its closest relatives within genus Cercomacra have not been determined.

The Manu antbird is monotypic.

== Description ==
The Manu antbird is 14 to 15.5 cm (5.5 to 6.1 in) long and weighs 16 to 20 g (0.56 to 0.71 oz). Adult males are mostly very dark gray, with paler gray on their face, flanks, and undertail coverts. They have a mostly hidden white patch between their scapulars, white tips on their wing coverts, and white tips on their tail feathers. Females have an olive-brown crown and back with a hidden white interscapular patch. Their wing coverts are dusky brown to black with white tips. Their tail is dark gray-brown with white crescents near the feather tips. Their face and underparts are neutral gray with faint white streaks on their chin and throat. Both sexes have a pale sandy brown iris, a black maxilla, a darkish-mottled silvery gray mandible, and pale gray legs and feet.

== Distribution and habitat ==
The Mamu antbird has a disjunct distribution. By far the largest area encompasses southeastern Peru in southeastern Ucayali, northern Cuzco, and most of Madre de Dios departments; Pando and La Paz departments in northern Bolivia; and western Brazil's Acre state. Small isolated populations are also found further east in Amazonian Brazil. It almost exclusively inhabits stands of Guadua bamboo in partially shaded forest edges such as along watercourses and roads. In elevation it ranges between 250 and 1,350 m (800 and 4,400 ft).

== Behavior ==
=== Movement ===
The Manu antbird is believed to be a year-round resident throughout its range.

=== Feeding ===
The Manu antbird's diet has not been detailed but is known to be primarily insects. Pairs usually forage in the tops of bamboo stands and the canopy just above them, typically between about 4 and 15 m (15 and 50 ft) above the ground. They hop through the vegetation and usually take prey by gleaning while perched; they will occasionally hover-glean. They occasionally join mixed-species feeding flocks that pass through their territory.

=== Breeding ===
The only known Manu antbird nest was a pouch made of dead bamboo leaves and plant fibers suspended from thin bamboo branchlets about 3.5 m (10 ft) above the ground. Nothing else is known about the species' breeding biology.

=== Vocalization ===
The male Manu antbird's song is "a slow series of deep, rich note pairs: pook-CHA pook-CHA pook-CHA pook-CHA". Females respond with a series of deep "kl'du" notes; both members of a pair may also sing this in duet. The species' call is "a descending chortling series of musical, hooting whistles "t'hee'hoo'lululululu".

== Status ==
The IUCN has assessed the Manu antbird as being of Least Concern. Its population size is not known and is believed to be decreasing. No immediate threats have been identified. It is considered uncommon to fairly common. "Bamboo is a successional species that sometimes occurs in sites disturbed by human activity, such as along roads; consequently, Manu Antbird may even benefit, locally and in the short term, from a low level of habitat disturbance. Nonetheless, in the long term Manu Antbird is vulnerable to widespread habitat loss in Amazonia."
