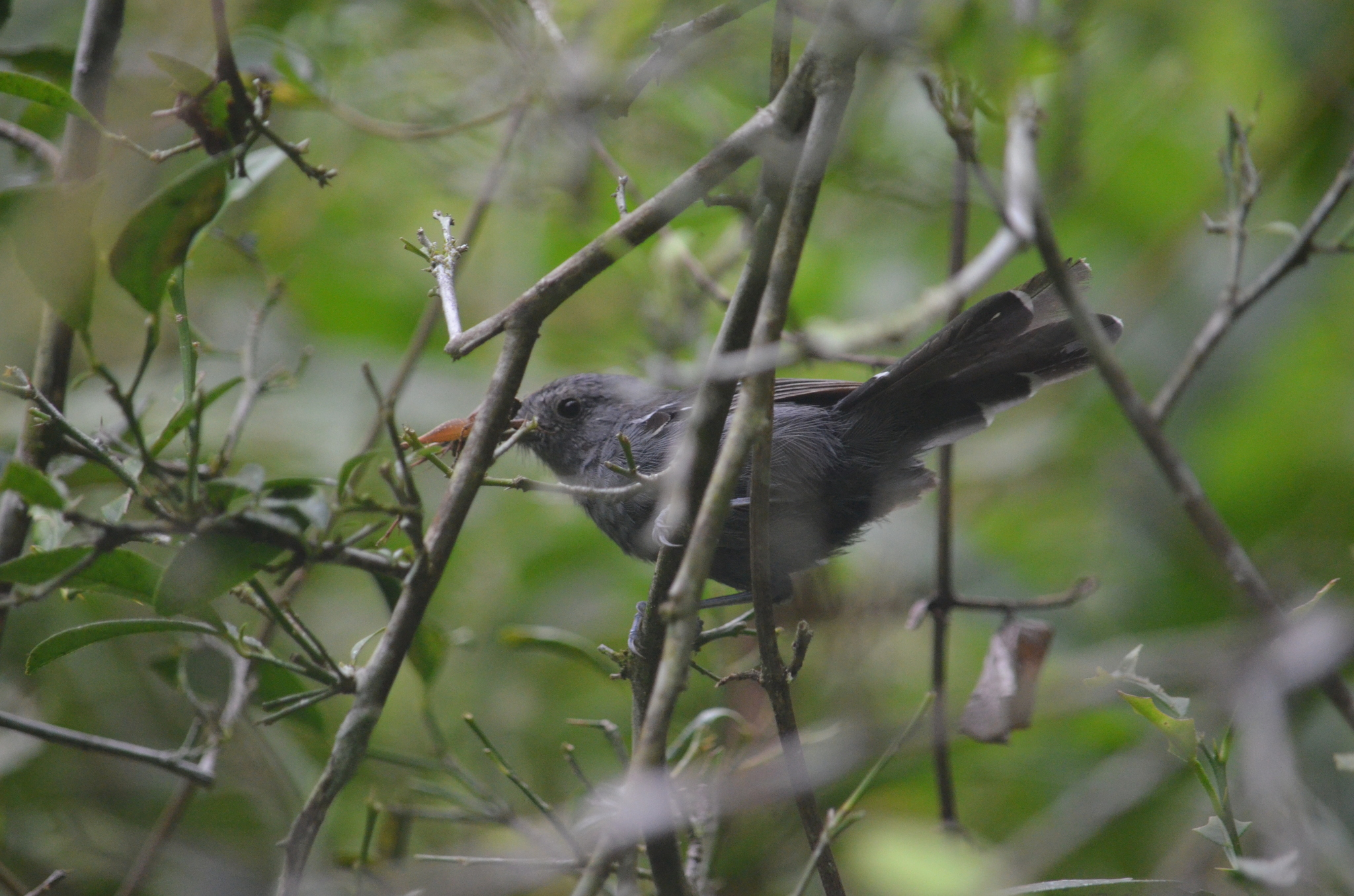
- Near Alem Pariba, Brazil

Conservation status
- Near Threatened (IUCN 3.1)

Scientific classification
- Kingdom: Animalia
- Phylum: Chordata
- Class: Aves
- Order: Passeriformes
- Family: Thamnophilidae
- Genus: Cercomacra
- Species: C. brasiliana

Binomial name
- Cercomacra brasiliana Hellmayr, 1905

= Rio de Janeiro antbird =

Species of bird

The Rio de Janeiro antbird (Cercomacra brasiliana) is a Near Threatened species of bird in subfamily Thamnophilinae of family Thamnophilidae, the "typical antbirds". It is endemic to Brazil.

== Taxonomy and systematics ==
The Rio de Janeiro antbird is monotypic. Its closest relatives within genus Cercomacra have not been determined.

== Description ==
The Rio de Janeiro antbird is 13 to 14 cm (5.1 to 5.5 in) long. Adult males are mostly gray, with darker upperparts and paler underparts. They have a white patch between their scapulars, a hidden white patch under the scapulars, and white tips on their wing coverts. Their tail is blackish gray with narrow white tips on the feathers. Their wings have a brown tinge. Females have olive-brown upperparts with a whitish area around their eye, a minimal white interscapular patch, and a grayer rump. Their wings are darker than their back. Their tail is pale olivaceous brown. Their throat and underparts are bright ochraceous tawny.

== Distribution and habitat ==
The Rio de Janeiro antbird is found in southeastern Brazil from southeastern Bahia south through eastern Minas Gerais and Espírito Santo into Rio de Janeiro state. It inhabits the dense understorey to mid-storey of secondary evergreen forest and particularly favors areas with abundant tangles of vines. In elevation it occurs from near sea level to about 950 m (3,100 ft).

== Behavior ==
=== Movement ===
The Rio de Janeiro antbird is believed to be a year-round resident throughout its range.

=== Feeding ===
The Rio de Janeiro antbird's diet has not been detailed but is known to be primarily insects; it probably also includes spiders. Individuals, pairs, and family groups usually forage between about 1 and 6 m (3 and 20 ft) above the ground. They hop through vine tangles and other dense vegetation and usually take prey by gleaning and lunging from a perch, and also with short flutter-flights. They occasionally briefly join mixed-species feeding flocks that pass through their territory but are not known to follow army ants.

=== Breeding ===
The Rio de Janeiro antbird's eggs are light brown covered with dark brown spots and flecks. Nothing else is known about the species' breeding biology.

=== Vocalization ===
The male Rio de Janeiro antbird's song is "2–4 rapidly delivered, abrupt, barely audible notes followed by [a] longer...harsh note". Females simultaneously sing irregularly repeated "notes sounding like 'cup' ". The species' calls include "a rapidly delivered series of short notes, first note more emphatic, and frequency-modulated versions of loudsong notes".

== Status ==
The IUCN originally in 1988 assessed the Rio de Janeiro antbird as Threatened and since 2004 as Near Threatened. It has a limited range and its estimated population of between 10,000 and 20,000 mature individuals is believed to be decreasing. "Although presumably threatened by deforestation...this species's [sic] apparent tolerance of secondary habitats...may reduce the impact of habitat degradation and fragmentation, and where the species occurs it does appear to show resilience to forest fragmentation." It is patchily distributed and considered generally rare to uncommon though locally common.
