= Generalized other =

Social science concept

The generalized other is a concept introduced by George Herbert Mead into the social sciences, and used especially in the field of symbolic interactionism. It is the general notion that a person has of the common expectations that others may have about actions and thoughts within a particular society, and thus serves to clarify their relation to the other as a representative member of a shared social system.

Any time that an actor tries to imagine what is expected of them, they are taking on the perspective of the generalized other.

An alternative name of the mentally constructed idea of who an audience is without real or complete insight is imagined audience.

== Precursors ==
Mead's concept of the generalised other has been linked to Adam Smith's notion of the impartial spectator – itself rooted in the earlier thinking of Addison and Epictectus.

Adam Smith wrote: "We Conceive ourselves as acting in the presence of a person quite candid and equitable, of one who...is meerly a man in general, an impartial Spectator who considers our conduct with the same indifference with which we regard that of other people".

== Role-play and games ==
Mead began by contrasting the experience of role-play and pretence in early childhood, in which one role simply gives way to a different one without any continuity, with that of the organised game: "in the latter", he stated, "the child must have the attitude of all the others involved in that game". He saw the organised game as vital for the formation of a mature sense of self, which can only be achieved by learning to respond to, and take on board, the others' attitudes toward the (changing) common undertakings they are involved in: i.e. the generalized other.

Mead argued that "in the game we get an organized other, a generalized other, which is found in the nature of the child itself....in the case of such a social group as a ball team, the team is the generalized other in so far as it enters – as an organized process or social activity – into the experience of any one of the individual members of it".

By seeing things from an anonymous perspective, that of the other, the child may eventually be able to visualize the intentions and expectations of others, and see him/herself from the point of view of groups of others – the viewpoint of the generalized other.

The attitude of the generalized other is the attitude of the larger community. According to Mead, the generalized other is the vehicle by which we are linked to society.

== Multiple generalized others ==
Arguably, a modern differentiated society contains as many generalized others as there are social groupings: as Mead put it, "every individual member of any given human society, of course, belongs to a large number of such different functional groups". The result is that everybody will articulate aspects of the range of socio-cultural values in their own way, taking on the perspectives of a set of generalized others in a unique synthesis.

With rising levels of socialisation and individuation, more and more people, and more and more aspects of the self come into play in the dialectic of self and generalized other.

== Psychoanalytic equivalents ==
As a concept, the generalised other is roughly equivalent to the idea of the Freudian superego. It has also been compared to Lacan's use of the Name of the Father, as the third party created by the presence of social convention, law, and language in all human interaction. It is also similar to Bakhtin's (Superaddressee) "superaddressee" presumed to receive and understand human communication.

== Imagined audiences in social media ==
Specifically referencing modern social media sites like Facebook and Twitter, Eden Litt and Eszter Hargittai explain that the imagined audience refers to a mental construct people form of their audience without real insight into who is actually consuming their online content.

This disconnect between a user's imagined audience and actual audience is affected by social norms and context, and could play a large role on impression management — if a user believes their audience is composed of certain people, they may curate their social media feed and image to reflect this belief. Notably, academic scholar Jacqueline Vickery found in a study that her informants attempted to dissociate themselves from peers they considered "ghetto." Since her informants were aware that Facebook friend connections are visible to everyone, those who were worried about associating with certain people then needed to maintain online distance by declining those friend requests.

Scholar danah boyd argues that the "imagined audience ... resembles the concept of the White audience inherent to respectability politics; namely, that one must be able to successfully perform a White-defined bourgeois self to achieve upward mobility." The relationship between the dominant, acceptable social norms and intersections of class, gender, racial, or ethnic norms creates tension when managing impressions for both the imagined audience and the invisible audience.

As sharing on social media continues to become more commonplace, the imagined audience will continue to play a role in how people choose to represent themselves on different platforms. For instance, a study on impression management in online dating found that participants had to navigate mediating conflict between the pressures of impression management and their desire to present an authentic sense of self. Other similar studies have also found that there are significant instances of misrepresentation in online dating: 86% of participants in one study felt that other members of their dating sites misrepresented their physical appearance. Misrepresentation, particularly on sites where participants are looking for companionship and love, could be explained by the idea of the imagined audience — as participants form the idea of who is actually viewing their profiles, they may cater their own online representation to be more appealing.

== See also ==
- Alfred Schutz
- Collective consciousness
- 'I' and the 'me'
- Ideal type
- Ideas of reference
- Microculture
- Reasonable person
- Reference groups
- Role model
- Self
- Social representations
- Symbolic order
