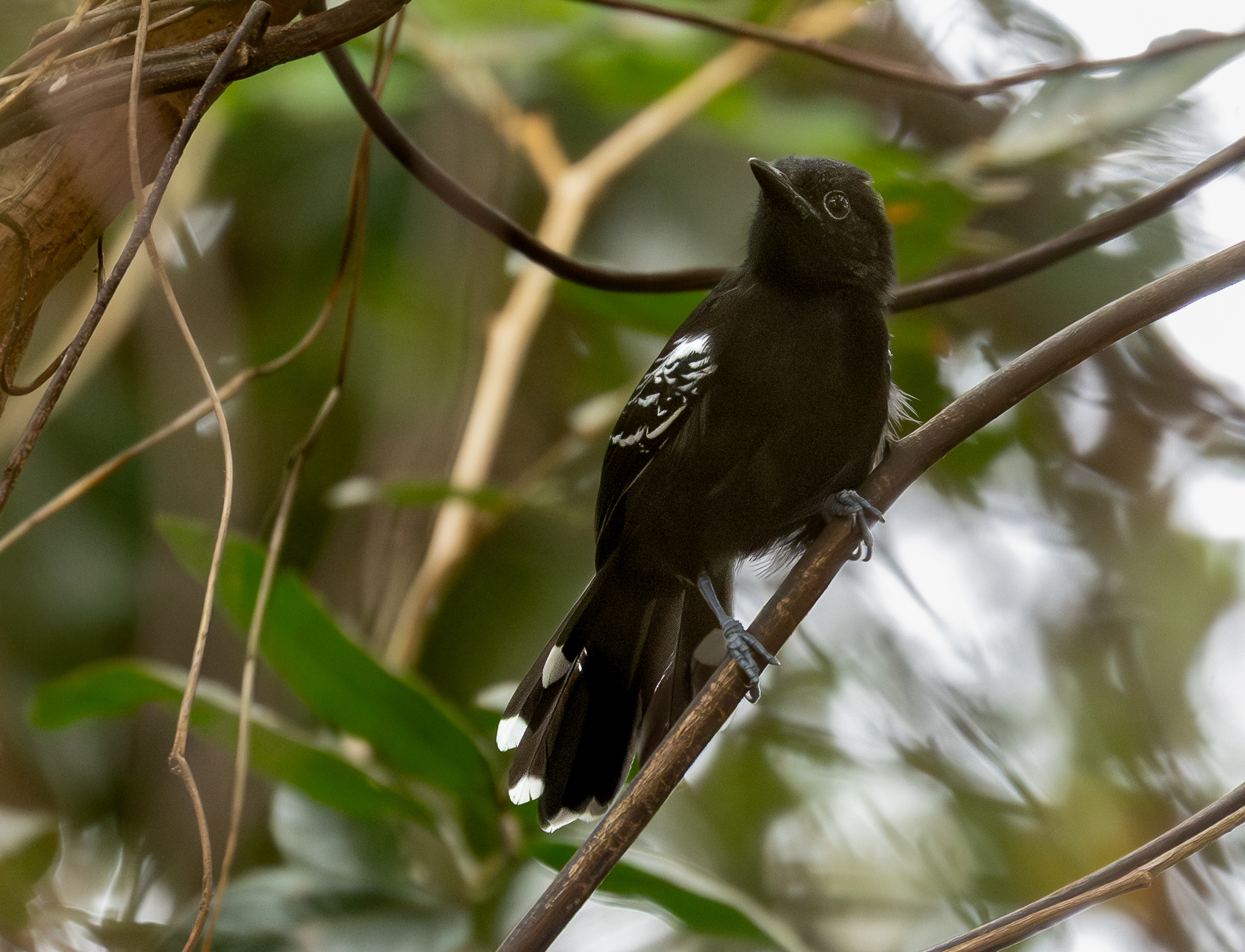

Conservation status
- Vulnerable (IUCN 3.1)

Scientific classification
- Kingdom: Animalia
- Phylum: Chordata
- Class: Aves
- Order: Passeriformes
- Family: Thamnophilidae
- Genus: Cercomacra
- Species: C. carbonaria

Binomial name
- Cercomacra carbonaria Sclater, PL & Salvin, 1873

= Rio Branco antbird =

Species of bird

The Rio Branco antbird (Cercomacra carbonaria) is a Vulnerable bird species in subfamily Thamnophilinae of family Thamnophilidae, the "typical antbirds". It is found in Brazil and Guyana.

== Taxonomy and systematics ==
The Rio Branco antbird was described by the English ornithologists Philip Sclater and Osbert Salvin in 1873 and given its current binomial name Cercomacra carbonaria. A 2014 study confirmed what had been earlier suggested, that the Rio Branco antbird and the Mato Grosso (C. melanaria), jet (C. nigricans), and Bananal (C. ferdinandi) antbirds form a clade within genus Cercomacra.

The Rio Branco antbird is monotypic.

== Description ==
The Rio Branco antbird is 14 to 15.5 cm (5.5 to 6.1 in) long; one individual weighed 14.5 g (0.51 oz). Adult males are almost entirely black, with white edges on their outer scapulars, a white patch between them, and a hidden white patch under them. Their wing coverts and tail feathers have white tips and their flight feathers have white inner edges. Females have a brownish gray head and upperparts with a white interscapular patch. Their wings and tail are dark gray with greenish gray edges on the flight feathers. Their wing coverts are blackish gray with white tips and their tail feathers have white tips. Their throat and upper breast are white with dark gray spots, their lower breast and belly are streaked with gray and buff-white, and their sides, flanks, and crissum are buff-gray.

== Distribution and habitat ==
The Rio Branco antbird is found along the Rio Branco from the Ireng River on the Guyana-Brazil border south downstream to the middle Rio Branco in Roraima and also on some of its tributaries. It inhabits the understorey to mid-storey of gallery forest and forested river islands. It almost always occurs in dense, vine-laden thickets. In elevation its range appears to be restricted to between 800 and 900 m (2,600 and 3,000 ft).

== Behavior ==
=== Movement ===
The Rio Branco antbird is believed to be a year-round resident throughout its range.

=== Feeding ===
The Rio Branco antbird's diet has not been detailed but is known to be insects and probably also includes spiders. Individuals, pairs, and family groups usually forage between about 1 and 7 m (3 and 23 ft) above the ground, though occasionally as high as 10 m (33 ft). They hop among vine tangles and other dense vegetation and usually take prey by gleaning and lunging from a perch and also sometimes with short fluttering flights. They are not known to join mixed-species feeding flocks nor to follow army ants.

=== Breeding ===
The Rio Branco antbird's breeding season has not been defined but appears to include from August or before to perhaps October. Its only known nest was a small cup suspended in a branch fork in a leafy shrub 1.5 m (5 ft) above the ground. Both members of a pair defended their territory. Nothing else is known about the species' breeding biology.

=== Vocalization ===
The male Rio Branco's song is "a couplet consisting of short buzzy note and longer, clearer note, repeated 4–10 (most often 4–7) times". Females often interject a "loud buzzy note" which the male then answers with a similar, but lower-pitched, note. The species' calls include a "duo or trio of abrupt notes, delivered rapidly, and [an] unclear whine that sounds like a tree branch squeaking in wind".

== Status ==
The IUCN originally in 1988 assessed the Rio Branco antbird as Threatened, then in 1994 as Vulnerable, in 2008 as Near Threatened, in 2012 as Critically Endangered, and as of 2024 it has been downlisted to Vulnerable. It has a small range and its estimated population of between 6,600 – 16,600 mature individuals is believed to be decreasing. It is primarily threatened by deforestation due to agriculture. It is considered locally fairly common but its available habitat is estimated to cover only 723 km^{2} (280 sq mi). In addition to deforestation for agriculture, fire (both intentional and accidental) has significantly reduced the species' available habitat. It is common in Viruá National Park.
