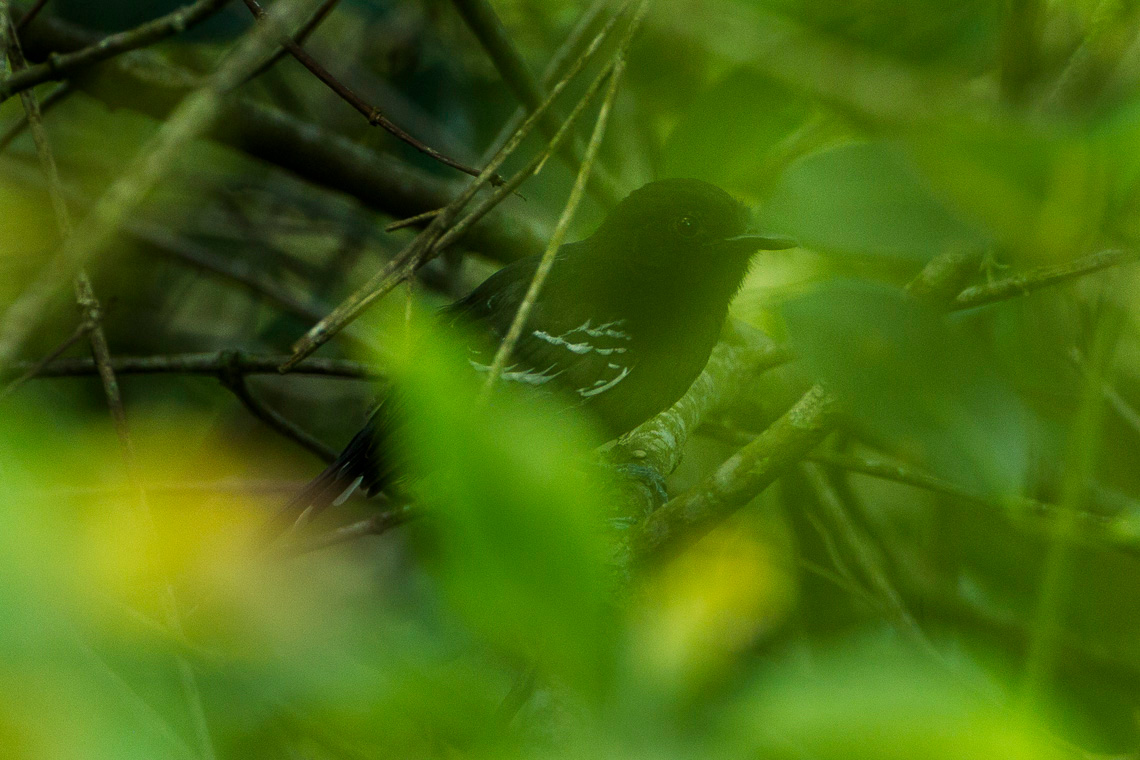

Conservation status
- Least Concern (IUCN 3.1)

Scientific classification
- Kingdom: Animalia
- Phylum: Chordata
- Class: Aves
- Order: Passeriformes
- Family: Thamnophilidae
- Genus: Cercomacra
- Species: C. nigricans

Binomial name
- Cercomacra nigricans Sclater, PL, 1858

= Jet antbird =

Species of bird

The jet antbird (Cercomacra nigricans) is a species of bird in subfamily Thamnophilinae of family Thamnophilidae, the "typical antbirds". It is found in Colombia, Ecuador, Panama, and Venezuela.

== Taxonomy and systematics ==
The jet antbird was described by the English zoologist Philip Sclater in 1858 and given its current binomial name Cercomacra nigricans. A 2014 study confirmed what had been earlier suggested, that the jet antbird and the Mato Grosso (C. melanaria), Rio Branco (C. carbonaria), and Bananal (C. ferdinandi) antbirds form a clade within genus Cercomacra.

The jet antbird is monotypic.

== Description ==
The jet antbird is 14 to 15.5 cm (5.5 to 6.1 in) long and weighs 15 to 17.5 g (0.53 to 0.62 oz). Adult males are almost entirely black, with white edges on their outer scapulars, a white patch between them, and a hidden white patch under them. Their wing coverts and tail feathers have white tips and their flight feathers have white inner edges. Females are mostly blackish gray, with white in the same places as the male. They also have a whitish ring around the eye, thin white streaks on their throat and breast, and white barring on their lower belly. Juvenile males are dull brown with narrow white tips on the tail feathers. Subadult males are like adult females with heavier markings.

== Distribution and habitat ==
The jet antbird has a disjunct distribution. One population is found from central Panama south into northern and western Colombia. Another extends from central Colombia northeast through western Venezuela. A third is centered along the Orinoco River in eastern Venezuela. The fourth extends along most of the length of western Ecuador. Its habitat varies geographically, from subtropical humid forest in Panama and Venezuela to drier deciduous forest and woodlands in Colombia and Ecuador. In all forest types it favors mature secondary forest and the edges of primary forest with a thick understorey of vines and shrubs, and usually near swampy areas or watercourses. In elevation it reaches 600 m (2,000 ft) in Venezuela, 1,500 m (4,900 ft) in Colombia, and 500 m (1,600 ft) in Ecuador.

== Behavior ==
=== Movement ===
The jet antbird is believed to be a year-round resident throughout its range.

=== Feeding ===
The jet antbird's diet has not been detailed but is known to be insects and spiders. Individuals, pairs, and family groups usually forage between about 1 and 10 m (3 and 33 ft) above the ground. They hop and flutter-fly among vine tangles and other dense vegetation and usually take prey by gleaning and lunging from a perch and also with short flutter-flights. They seldom join mixed-species feeding flocks and also seldom follow army ant swarms.

=== Breeding ===
The jet antbird's breeding season has not been defined but apparently includes December to March in Colombia. One nest was a cup made of dry grasses suspended from a branch fork low in a bush. It held two pinkish eggs heavily marked with reddish brown and lilac. Eggs in a different nest were described as pink with dark purplish red, lavender, and other dark markings. Nothing else is known about the species' breeding biology.

=== Vocalization ===
The male jet antbird's song is "4 or more pairs of notes, each pair consisting of sharp abrupt note followed by longer burry note" and has been written as "harsh paired 'tch-ker' notes". The species' call is "a harsh note repeated in series" like "chak chak chak chak chak chak".

== Status ==
The IUCN has assessed the jet antbird as being of Least Concern. It has a very large range and an estimated population of at least 500,000 mature individuals; its population is believed to be decreasing. No immediate threats have been identified. It is considered uncommon to fairly common though patchily distributed. It is found in several protected areas, and its "ability to exploit a variety of second-growth habitats renders it less vulnerable to disturbance than are many antbirds".
