= 'I' and the 'me' =

Philosophy terms

The 'I' and the 'me' are terms central to the social philosophy of George Herbert Mead, one of the key influences on the development of the branch of sociology called symbolic interactionism. The terms refer to the psychology of the individual, where in Mead's understanding, the "me" is the socialized aspect of the person, and the "I" is the active aspect of the person.

One might usefully 'compare Mead's "I" and "me", respectively, with Sartre's "choice" and "the situation". But Mead himself matched up the "me" with Freud's "censor", and the "I" with his "ego"; and this is psychologically apt.

== Characteristics ==
The "Me" is what is learned in interaction with others and (more generally) with the environment: other people's attitudes, once internalized in the self, constitute the Me. This includes both knowledge about that environment (including society), but also about who the person is: their sense of self. "What the individual is for himself is not something that he invented. It is what his significant others have come to ...treat him as being." This is because people learn to see who they are (man or woman, old or young, etc.) by observing the responses of others to themselves or their actions. If others respond to a person as (for instance) a woman, the person develops a sense of herself indeed as a woman.

At the same time, 'the "Me" disciplines the "I" by holding it back from breaking the law of the community'. It is thus very close to the way in a man Freud's 'ego-censor, the conscience...arose from the critical influence of his parents (conveyed to him by the medium of the voice), to whom were added, as time went on, those who trained and taught him and the innumerable and indefinable host of all the other people in his environment—his fellow-men—and public opinion'. It is 'the attitude of the other in one's own organism, as controlling the thing that he is going to do'.

By contrast, 'the "I" is the response of the individual to the attitude of the community'. The "I" acts creatively, though within the context of the me. Mead notes that "It is only after we have acted that we know what we have done...what we have said." People, he argues, are not automatons; Mead states that "the "I" reacts to the self which arises through the taking of the attitudes of others." They do not blindly follow rules. They construct a response on the basis of what they have learned, the "me". Mead highlighted accordingly those values that attach particularly to the "I" rather than to the me, "...which cannot be calculated and which involve a reconstruction of the society, and so of the 'me' which belongs to that society." Taken together, the "I" and the "me" form the person or the self in Mead's social philosophy. According to Mead, there would be no possibility of personality without both the "I" and the "Me".

== Fusion ==
Mead explored what he called 'the fusion of the "I" and the "me" in the attitudes of religion, patriotism, and team work', noting what he called the "peculiar sense of exaltation" that belongs to them. He also considered that 'the idea of the fusion of the "I" and the "me" gives a very adequate explanation of this exaltation...in the aesthetic experience'.

In everyday life, however, 'a complete fusion of the "I" and the "me" may not be a good thing...it is a dynamic sort of balance between the "I" and the "me" that is required'.

== Conventionality ==
When there is a predominance of the "me" in the personality, 'we speak of a person as a conventional individual; his ideas are exactly the same as those of his neighbours; he is hardly more than a "me" under the circumstances'—"...the shallow, brittle, conformist kind of personality..." that is "all persona, with its excessive concern for what people think." The alternative—and in many ways Mead's ideal—was the person who has a definite personality, who replies to the organized attitude in a way that makes a significant difference. With such a person, the I is the most important phase of the experience.

== Dissociation ==
Mead recognised that it is normal for an individual to have 'all sorts of selves answering to all sorts of different social reactions', but also that it was possible for 'a tendency to break up the personality' to appear: 'Two separate "me's" and "I's", two different selves, result...the phenomenon of dissociation of personality'.

== Literary examples ==
Walt Whitman 'marks off the impulsive "I", the natural, existential aspect of the self, from critical sanction. It is the cultured self, the "me", in Mead's terms, that needs re-mediation'.

== See also ==
- Conformist stage
- Generalized other
- Open individualism
- Socialization
- True self and false self
- Vertiginous question
