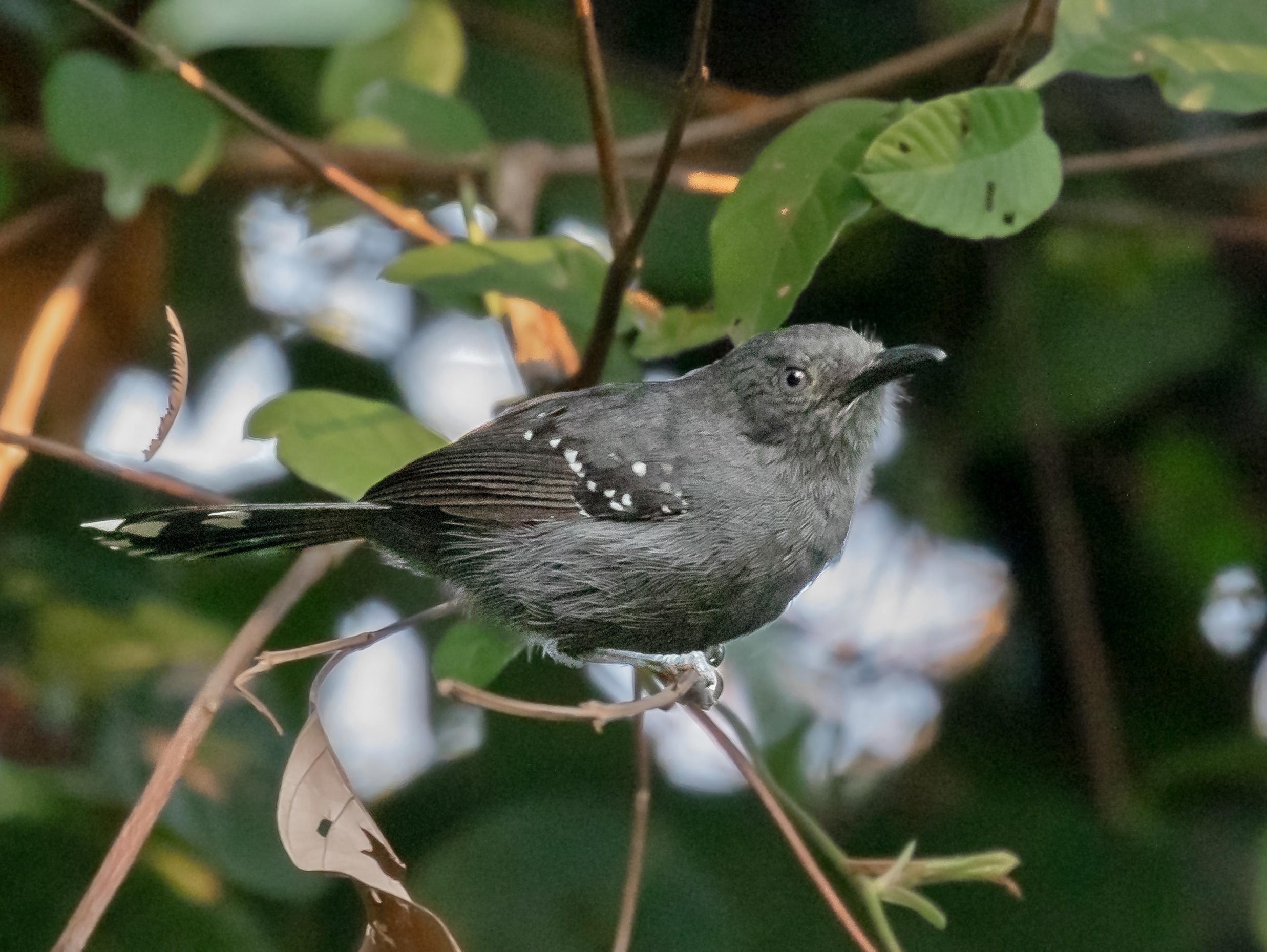
- Male in Pará, Brazil

Conservation status
- Least Concern (IUCN 3.1)

Scientific classification
- Kingdom: Animalia
- Phylum: Chordata
- Class: Aves
- Order: Passeriformes
- Family: Thamnophilidae
- Genus: Cercomacra
- Species: C. cinerascens

Binomial name
- Cercomacra cinerascens (Sclater, PL, 1857)

= Grey antbird =

Species of bird

The grey antbird (Cercomacra cinerascens) is a species of bird in subfamily Thamnophilinae of family Thamnophilidae, the "typical antbirds". It is found in Bolivia, Brazil, Colombia, Ecuador, French Guiana, Guyana, Peru, Suriname, and Venezuela.

== Taxonomy and systematics ==
The grey antbird was described by the English zoologist Philip Sclater in 1857 from a specimen obtained near the Rio Napo in Ecuador. He coined the binomial name Formicivora cinerascens. The specific epithet is Late Latin meaning "ashen". This antbird is now placed in the genus Cercomacra that was introduced by Sclater in 1858.

The grey antbird has these four subspecies:

- C. c. cinerascens (Sclater, PL, 1857)
- C. c. immaculata Chubb, C, 1918
- C. c. sclateri Hellmayr, 1905
- C. c. iterata Zimmer, JT, 1932

Some early twentieth century authors treated C. c. sclateri as a separate species but by the middle of the century it had obtained its current status. More recently some authors have suggested that it and C. c. iterata might be species in their own right.

== Description ==
The grey antbird is 13 to 15 cm (5.1 to 5.9 in) long and weighs 14 to 18 g (0.49 to 0.63 oz). Adult males of the nominate subspecies C. c. cinerascens have dark gray upperparts with a small white patch between their scapulars. Their tail is blackish gray with wide white spots at the ends of the feathers. Their wings have a brown tinge and have faint white spots on the coverts. Females have olive-brown crown and upperparts, a minimal white interscapular patch, and a grayer rump. Their wings are darker than their back with pale yellowish olive tips on the coverts. Their tail is slaty with white terminal spots. Their throat and underparts are mostly olive-yellow with dusky flanks and crissum. Subadult males resemble adult females with a larger interscapular patch.

Males of subspecies C. c. immaculata have a minimal or no interscapular patch and females have smaller spots on their tail than the nominate. Both sexes of C. c. sclateri have larger white interscapular patches and tail tips than the nominate. Males are darker overall than the nominate and have larger white spots on their wing coverts and a hidden white patch under them. C. c. iterata is similar to sclateri though both sexes are paler. Females' rumps are the same color as their back and their tail is olivaceous with a black band near the end of the feathers.

== Distribution and habitat ==
The subspecies of the grey antbird are found thus:

- C. c. cinerascens: southeastern Colombia and southern Venezuela south through eastern Ecuador and northwestern Amazonian Brazil into northeastern Peru to the Amazon and Marañón rivers
- C. c. immaculata: eastern Venezuela, the Guianas and northeastern Amazonian Brazil
- C. c. sclateri: eastern Peru south of the Amazon and (mostly) Marañón, southwestern Amazonian Brazil, and northwestern Bolivia
- C. c. iterata: southeastern Amazonian Brazil from the Madeira River east to western Maranhão state and south through southern Pará and western Mato Grosso into northeastern Bolivia

The grey antbird inhabits the dense vegetation in the mid-storey and subcanopy of terra firme evergreen forest, where it particularly favors areas with abundant tangles of vines. In elevation it occurs from near sea level to about 900 m (3,000 ft) in much of its range. It occurs mostly below 700 m (2,300 ft) in Colombia and Ecuador but reaches 1,150 m (3,800 ft) in Peru.

== Behavior ==
=== Movement ===
The grey antbird is believed to be a year-round resident throughout its range.

=== Feeding ===
The grey antbird's diet has not been detailed but is known to be primarily insects and includes spiders. Individuals, pairs, and family groups usually forage between about 8 and 20 m (25 and 65 ft) above the ground and sometimes higher. They hop through vine tangles and other dense vegetation and usually take prey by gleaning and lunging from a perch. They sometimes join mixed-species feeding flocks that pass through their territory. In Brazil they have been observed briefly following Eciton burchelli army ant swarms.

=== Breeding ===
One grey antbird nest was made of vines and another was mostly leaves and sticks. The eggs of C. c. sclateri are pale brown with rich brown and gray streaks and blotches. Those of C. c. immaculata are dull reddish white with red-brown and brown markings. Nothing else is known about the species' breeding biology.

=== Vocalization ===
The grey antbird's songs appear to differ somewhat among the subspecies but no detailed analysis has been made. In Venezuela its song has been described as "a mushy rising and falling crook-shank". In Ecuador it has been described as a "distinctive gravelly...'ch-krr, ch-krr, ch-krr...', somewhat hiccup-like". In Peru it is described as "djjj-HUR djjj-HUR djjj-HUR". The species' calls include a "slow rattle in which individual notes [are] distinct" and a "fast rattle with notes run together". Males also make a "sharp 'k-luck' " and females a "sharp 'zhip' and [a] low-pitched nasal growl".

== Status ==
The IUCN has assessed the grey antbird as being of Least Concern. It has an extremely large range; its population size is not known and is believed to be decreasing. No immediate threats have been identified. It is considered common throughout its range, which includes many protected areas "as well as vast areas of suitable habitat which, although not formally protected, are in little danger of development in the short term".
