= Microculture =

Systems of cultural knowledge unique to subgroups

Microculture refers to the specialised subgroups, marked with their own languages, ethos and rule expectations, that permeate differentiated industrial societies.

A microculture depends on the smallest units of organization – dyads, groups, or local communities – as opposed to the broader subcultures of race or class, and the wider national/global culture, compared to which they tend also to be more short-lived, as well as voluntarily chosen. The study of kinesics – the nonverbal behavior of the small gathering – can be used to illuminate the dynamics of a given microculture.

== Precursors ==
Georg Simmel drew a distinction between the universalist claims of ethics, and the more particularist concept of honour, which he considered linked to the specific social subworld – business or profession – in which it was rooted. His study of secrecy also looked at the micro-secret as an aspect of meaning-control within the individual microculture.

== Microclimate ==
A microculture works in the same way as a microclimate, which refers to a local set of atmospheric conditions that are different from the climate of surrounding areas. In this analogy, culture is likened to climate where the latter contains many microclimates within it while the former contains multiple, smaller, and more specific microcultures. A microculture – whether formed by a racetrack, a university, a holiday camp or a pub – can be seen as having its own social micro-climate, with values and norms of behaviour of its own, to an extent differing from those of the general culture. Such micro-climates are situational, specific to their own circumstances. For instance, although a pub is considered part of the English culture, it also contains its own microculture wherein one can find a structured and temporary relaxation of social norms. The same is true in the case of a racetrack where spectators from all social classes converge amid a relaxation of the constraints of respectability. Kate Fox considered that "the social micro-climate of the racecourse is characterized by a unique combination of disinhibition and exceptional good manners".

== Microculture/mainstream ==
Arguably the wider range of choices offered by the new mass media are increasingly allowing individuals to cohere within their own microcultures, rather than exposing themselves to the cultural mainstream.

The fragmentation of postmodern consumer microstructures, with their volitional and ephemeral nature, also presents a pattern of mainstream erosion in the face of an increasing number of competing microcultures.

== Online microcultures ==
The early years of the internet saw connectivity limited to a small number of computer-savvy Netizens with their own emerging netiquette or microculture. By the late 1990s, a number of microcultures, such as Slashdot, had developed online; with the Noughties, Slashdot ethos would contribute to the new wiki culture of Wikipedia.

Wikipedia would then spawn its own internal microcultures, not only between different language communities, such as English, German and Japanese, but within the same language as well: subjects, work projects, ideologies all forming nodes around which microcultures could form. Such a proliferation of microcultures is typical of the internet, GNU forming a particularly fertile sources of such local communities.

== Field research ==
Social psychology field researchers are alerted to the fact that different field settings – such as hospitals, airport or cafeterias – may have their own particular micro-cultures, influencing people's actions and motivation in micro-specific ways, so that findings from any given setting should not be generalised without external checking.

== Literary examples ==
In the 1998 fantasy novel Night Watch, the hero's mentor, urging him not to abandon his supernatural colleagues, points out that every profession has its own microculture outside of which a certain isolation is inevitable.

== See also ==
- Argot
- Generalised other
- Intercultural competence
- Micromarketing
- Microsociology
- Proxemics
- Reference group
- Social identity
- Symbolic boundaries
