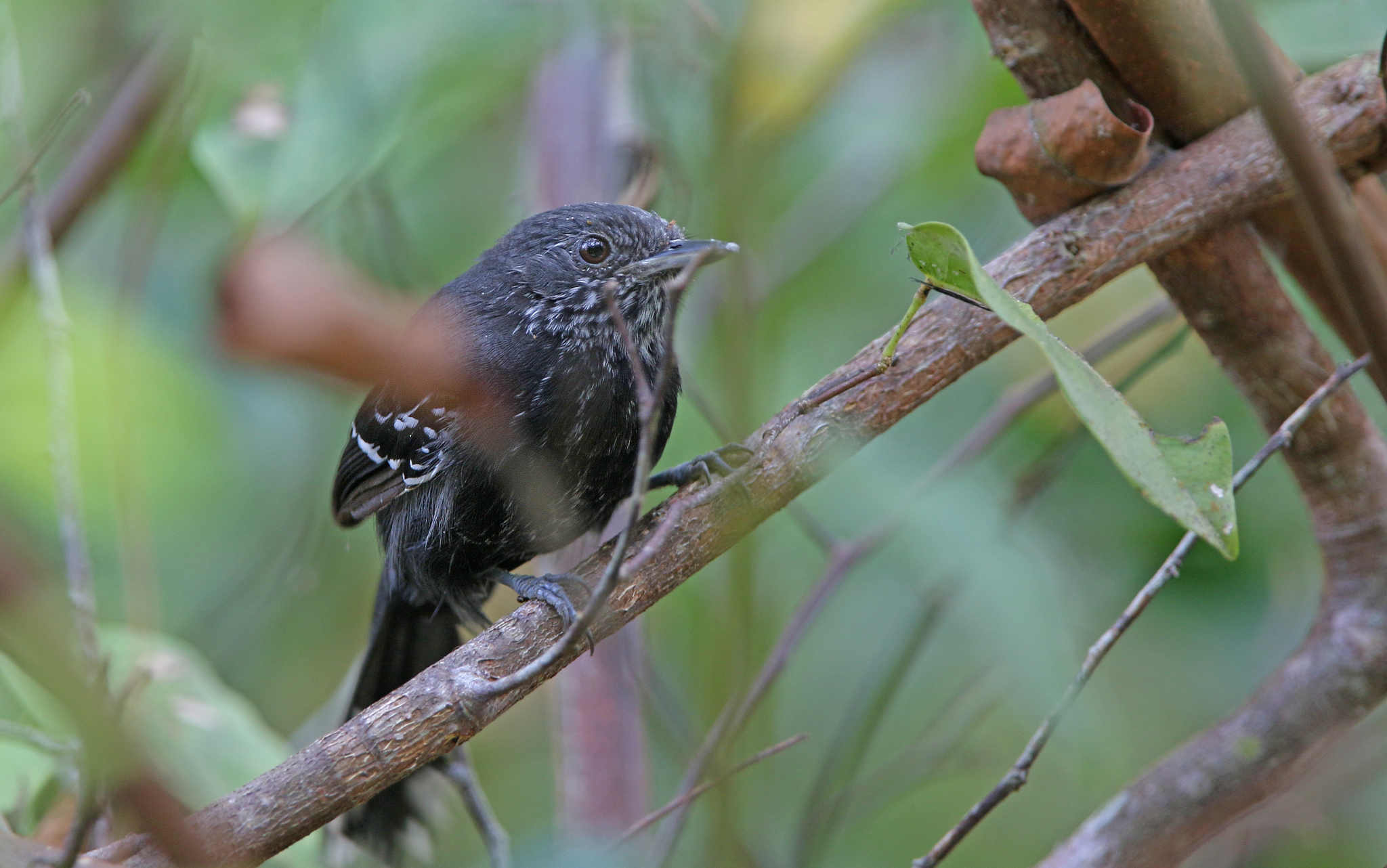
- Jet antbird (Cercomacra nigricans)

Scientific classification
- Kingdom: Animalia
- Phylum: Chordata
- Class: Aves
- Order: Passeriformes
- Family: Thamnophilidae
- Genus: Cercomacra; Sclater, 1858

Type species
- Cercomacra brasiliana Hellmayr, 1905

Species
- See text

= Cercomacra =

Genus of birds

Cercomacra is a genus of passerine birds in the antbird family Thamnophilidae. They are insect-feeding birds that mainly inhabit tropical and subtropical forest areas of South America, extending into Central America. Cercomacra is distinguished from other bird genera by its sexual dimorphism and communication patterns. They often forage close to the ground or in low vegetation. A molecular phylogenetic study has shown that the traditional genus Cercomacra is not monophyletic but is divided into two distinct lineages: the "nigricans group", which retains the original genus name, and the "tyrannina group", now recognized as the separate genus Cercomacroides.

== Taxonomy ==
The genus Cercomacra was introduced in 1858 by the English zoologist Philip Sclater. He listed five species in the new genus but did not specify the type. Over thirty years later in 1890 Sclater designated the type as Cercomacra caerulescens P.L. Sclater, 1858. Unfortunately, the specific epithet had been used in 1817 by the French ornithologist Louis Vieillot for a related species. In 1905 the Austrian ornithologist Carl Eduard Hellmayr designated the type species as Cercomacra brasiliana Hellmayr, 1905, the Rio de Janeiro antbird. The genus name Cercomacra combines the Ancient Greek κερκος/kerkos meaning "tail" with μακρος/makros meaning "long".

The genus is a member of the family Thamnophilidae, also called antbirds. The antbirds included in the genus Cercomacra are relatively large, have unicolored feathers and wide, flat beaks, distinguishing them from genera such as Formicivora and Pyriglena. At that time, Cercomacra was interpreted as a transitional form between these genera, while retaining sufficient structural features to support its distinction. Sclater's classification was based on wild specimens from various regions of South America, including Brazil and the upper reaches of the Amazon River.

Historically, Cercomacra was regarded as a monophyletic genus comprising twelve species. In 2014, a study reassessed the genus Cercomacra using molecular phylogenetic analyses based on mitochondrial and nuclear genetic markers. The results strongly opposed the monophyly of the traditional genus and supported its division into two distinct branches. The so-called "nigricans clade" retained the name Cercomacra, while the "tyrannina group" was elevated to a new genus, Cercomacroides. The researchers determined that the evolutionary split of the nigricans(Cercomacra) and tyrannina (Cercomacroides) groups occurred between the late Miocene and early Pliocene (approximately 9 to 4.2 million years ago). The reclassification was further supported by differences in morphology, vocalizations, and ecological preferences.

The genus now contains seven species:

Image	Scientific name	Common name	Distribution	IUCN data
	Cercomacra brasiliana	Rio de Janeiro antbird	Bahia forests	NT (near threatened)
	Cercomacra carbonaria	Rio Branco antbird	Branco River	VU (vulnerable)
	Cercomacra cinerascens	Grey antbird	Amazonia	LC (least concern)
	Cercomacra ferdinandi	Bananal antbird	Araguaia River	NT (near threatened)
	Cercomacra manu	Manu antbird	southern Amazonia	LC (least concern)
	Cercomacra melanaria	Mato Grosso antbird	Bolivia and Pantanal	LC (least concern)
	Cercomacra nigricans	Jet antbird	Panama, Colombia, Venezuela and Ecuador	LC (least concern)

The authors of a morphological and acoustic study of the grey antbird (Cercomacra cinerascens) complex published in 2026 proposed that the complex should be split into five species. The genetic differences were not analysed.

=== Threats and protection ===
The species within Cercomacra are not currently listed as globally endangered. However, their populations are being affected by habitat loss and fragmentation. The human impacts in tropical South America, including deforestation, agricultural expansion, and infrastructure development, are the main reason for the decreasing populations of Cercomacra.

== Morphology and behaviour ==
Species of Cercomacra are small to medium-sized antbirds, measuring approximately 13 to 16.5 cm (5.1 to 6.5in) in length and weighing between 14 and 20 grams (0.49 to 0.71 oz). They display strong sexual dimorphism in plumage. Males have predominantly black or dark gray plumage with distinctive white spots or tips on their tail feathers. Females display more subdued olive-grey or greyish-brown plumage. In contrast, females of Cercomacroides usually display tawny-buff plumage.

=== Communication ===
Cercomacra species communicate with each other through complex vocal duets. These coordinated songs are usually performed between paired males and females. This kind of communication behaviour plays a central role in defending territory, strengthening partner bonds, and facilitating reproductive isolation between close relatives who share similar habitats. The structure of these vocalizations usually consists of rapid, rhythmic, short note exchanges with a distinct arrangement between males and females. In addition to vocal duets, Cercomacra species also exhibit visual behaviors such as tail flicking and subtle wing movements, especially during territorial displays or close interactions. These actions may enhance the transfer of their acoustic signals.

=== Nesting ===
Species of the genus Cercomacra typically place open, cup-shaped nests horizontally in dense vine tangles or low vegetation in tropical forests. In contrast, Cercomacroides species build deep pouch-like nests suspended from vegetation. Nest placement and construction provide camouflage and protection from predators and inclement weather. These nests are usually relatively close to the ground or in the understory of the forest. Male and female birds share nesting duties, which include building, incubation, and feeding. Those behaviours can reinforce their strong pair bond.

=== Feeding ===
Cercomacra species are insectivorous. They usually find food in leaves and branches of the understory and mid-canopy. Of the 131 existing avian families, more than 11% interact with ants. Among them, antbirds – including the genus Cercomacra – stand out particularly in tropical biomes, where they engage in complex relationships such as symbiosis, competition and predation. In studies of antbird genera, there is evidence that antbirds exhibit colony-following behavior. Unlike other antbirds, Cercomacra is regarded as an opportunistic participant in this interaction, benefitting from the prey of the ant colony.

=== Perching and roosting ===
Cercomacra often hides in dense vegetation. During their vocal displays, individuals may move to more exposed branches to have better transmissions. Their perching behaviour is usually brief, followed by quick and agile jumps or flights to feed or patrol their territory.

== Distribution ==
Species of Cercomacra are distributed across neotropical regions in the Amazon basin and adjacent lowland rainforests. Most species are found in the humid tropical forests of the Amazon. Some, such as Cercomacra brasiliana, are limited to Brazil's Atlantic Forest. Cercomacra manu inhabits bamboo-dominated forests in the foothills of the Andes. Cercomacra species can also be found in Colombia, Venezuela, Brazil, Peru, Bolivia, and Guyana.
