= Linsey McGoey =

Canadian sociologist

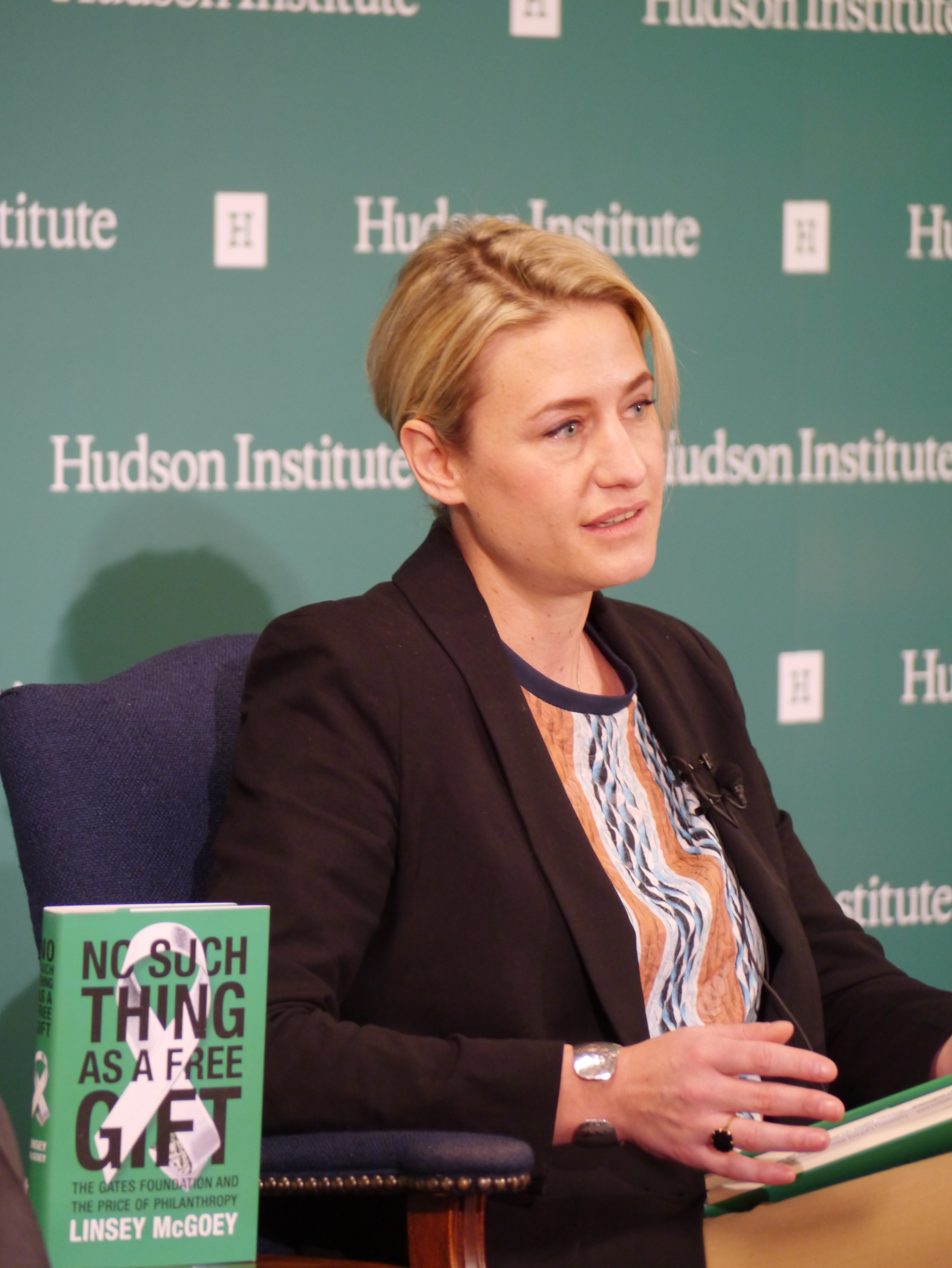
- Linsey McGoey
- Born: 17 April 1978 (age 48)
- Known for: Research in Ignorance studies and about charity

Academic background
- Education: London School of Economics
- Thesis: The value of ignorance: Antidepressant drugs and the policies of objectivity in medicine (2007)

Academic work
- Discipline: Sociology

Linsey McGoey (born 17 April 1978) is a Canadian sociologist and academic based in England. She is a professor in the Department of Sociology at the University of Essex. She is known for having written about philanthropy in her book No Such Thing as a Free Gift and co-editing the Routledge International Handbook of Ignorance Studies with Matthias Gross. Her next book, The Unknowers: How Elite Ignorance Rules the World, was published in 2019.

== Education and career ==
She was educated at Carleton University, graduating with a BA in Journalism. She then completed an MA at the London School of Economics in Anthropology.

She received a PhD from the London School of Economics in 2007 with a thesis on The value of ignorance: Antidepressant drugs and the policies of objectivity in medicine.

== Major works ==
- McGoey, L. (2014). An introduction to the sociology of ignorance: essays on the limits of knowing. Routledge Taylor & Francis Group. ISBN 978-1-13-877967-9.
- Gross, M. and McGoey, L., editors (2015). Routledge International Handbook of Ignorance Studies. Routledge. ISBN 978-0-415-71896-7.
- McGoey, L. (2015). No Such Thing as a Free Gift: The Gates Foundation and the Price of Philanthropy. Verso Publication. ISBN 9781784780838.
- McGoey, L. (2019). The Unknowers: How Strategic Ignorance Rules the World. Zed Books Ltd. ISBN 978-1780326351.
