= Sociological aspects of secrecy =

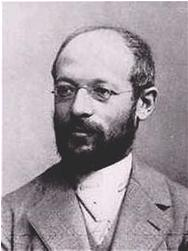
Georg Simmel

The sociological aspects of secrecy were first studied by Georg Simmel in the early-1900s. Simmel describes secrecy as the ability or habit of keeping secrets. He defines the secret as the ultimate sociological form for the regulation of the flow and distribution of information. Simmel put it best by saying "if human interaction is conditioned by the capacity to speak, it is shaped by the capacity to be silent." It also can control the very essence of social relations through manipulations of the ratio of "knowledge" to "ignorance".

== The secrecy "concept" ==
Simmel defines the secret society as an interactional unit characterized in its total by the fact that reciprocal relations among its members are governed by the protective function of secrecy. This central feature is established on a dual contingency:

1. Members of the interactional unit are concerned with the protection of ideas, objects, activities, and/or sentiments to which they attach positive value (i.e., which are rewarding them)
2. The members seek this protection by controlling the distribution of information about the valued elements (i.e., by creating and maintaining relevant conditions of ignorance in the external environment) depending upon the extensiveness of secrecy, the organization takes one of two forms; those in which the secret incorporates information about all aspects of the interactional unit, including its very existence; and those in which only some aspects, such as membership, regulations, or goals, remain secret.

== Simmel's Propositions ==
Georg Simmel came up with some unifying threads that he summed up and called the "Propositions". What these propositions function as is that they work together and apply primarily to the genetic and developmental conditions of the secret society. Here are a few of them.

Proposition 1
The more value of an idea, object, activity, or sentiment is predicated on the restricted distribution of information about that idea, object, activity or sentiment, the more likely those persons who so define the value will organize as a secret society.

Proposition 2
The more valued ideas, objects, activities, or sentiments of the members of a social unit are perceived as disproportionately threatened by those of nonmembers, the more likely the members will organize as a secret society.

Proposition 3
The greater the tendency toward political oppression and totalitarian regimentation in the larger society, the greater the tendency toward development of secret societies within the larger society.

Proposition 4
The greater the value of the ideas, objects, activities, or sentiments that constitute the focus of secrecy, the greater the tendency of the secret society toward total inclusion of its members' activities, sentiments, ideas and objects, and the greater the members' isolation from other interactional units.

Proposition 5
The greater the tendency toward total inclusion, the more the organization adopts characteristics of the larger society.

Proposition 6
The greater the tendency toward the total inclusion, the more likely the members possess aristocratic self-conceptions.

Proposition 7
The more extensive the secrecy of the secret society, the greater the tendency toward centralization of authority.

== Rehabilitating the secret ==
Some scholars working in sociology have attempted to rehabilitate the secret: to question the moral distaste it has accumulated in the current era of transparency in order to think through its more creative, productive or politically resistant possibilities.

== The censorship idea ==
Secrecy and censorship can involve norms about the control of information. This idea was integrated by saying that Censorship of communication in the modern sense is associated with large, complex urban societies with a degree of centralized control and technical means of effectively reaching a mass audience. It involves a determination of what can, and can not (or in the case of non-governmental efforts should and should not) be expressed in light of given political, religious, cultural, and artistic standards. The appearance of new communications (e.g., the printing press or the Internet) technologies invariably create demands from conflicting groups for greater openness and freedom of communication and demands for greater control. Authorities try (often in vain) to control new techniques of mass communication. Three major means of direct censorship (pre-publication review, licensing and registration, and government monopolization) are preventive in nature. Among democracies there is considerable variation in censorship by content, media of communication, place, time period and across societies. There are degrees of censorship and individual interests are balanced against those of the community, however hard the latter is to define. More common than outright prohibition, is the segmentation of material involving time, place and person restrictions. Direct government means of censorship must be considered separately from the availability of resources to create and distribute information, the activities of private groups and from informal censorship, including exclusion from sources of information and self-censorship. In a democratic society secrecy and openness exist in a continual dynamic tension.

== See also ==
- Secrets (disambiguation)
- Society
- Government
- Conspiracy
- Philosophy
- Marx
- Microculture
- Confidentiality
- Conspiracy theory
- Deception
- Don't ask, don't tell
- Espionage

== Additional resources ==
- Eric Jaffe. "The Science Behind Secrets". Observer.
- Lowry, Ritchie P. (1972). "Towards a Sociology of Secrecy and Security Systems". Social Problems. 19 (4): 437–50. doi:10.2307/799923. JSTOR 799923.
- Susan Maret (2016). "The Charm of Secrecy: Secrecy and Society as Secrecy Studies". Secrecy and Society. 1 (1): 28.
- Gary T. Marx (2001). "Censorship and Secrecy, Social and Legal Perspectives". International Encyclopedia of the Social and Behavioral Sciences.
- Joseph S. Roucek (1960). "Sociology of Secret Societies". American Journal of Economics and Sociology. 19 (2): 161. doi:10.1111/j.1536-7150.1960.tb00370.x.
- "Georg Simmel: Biographic Information".
