= Secrecy =

Practice of hiding information

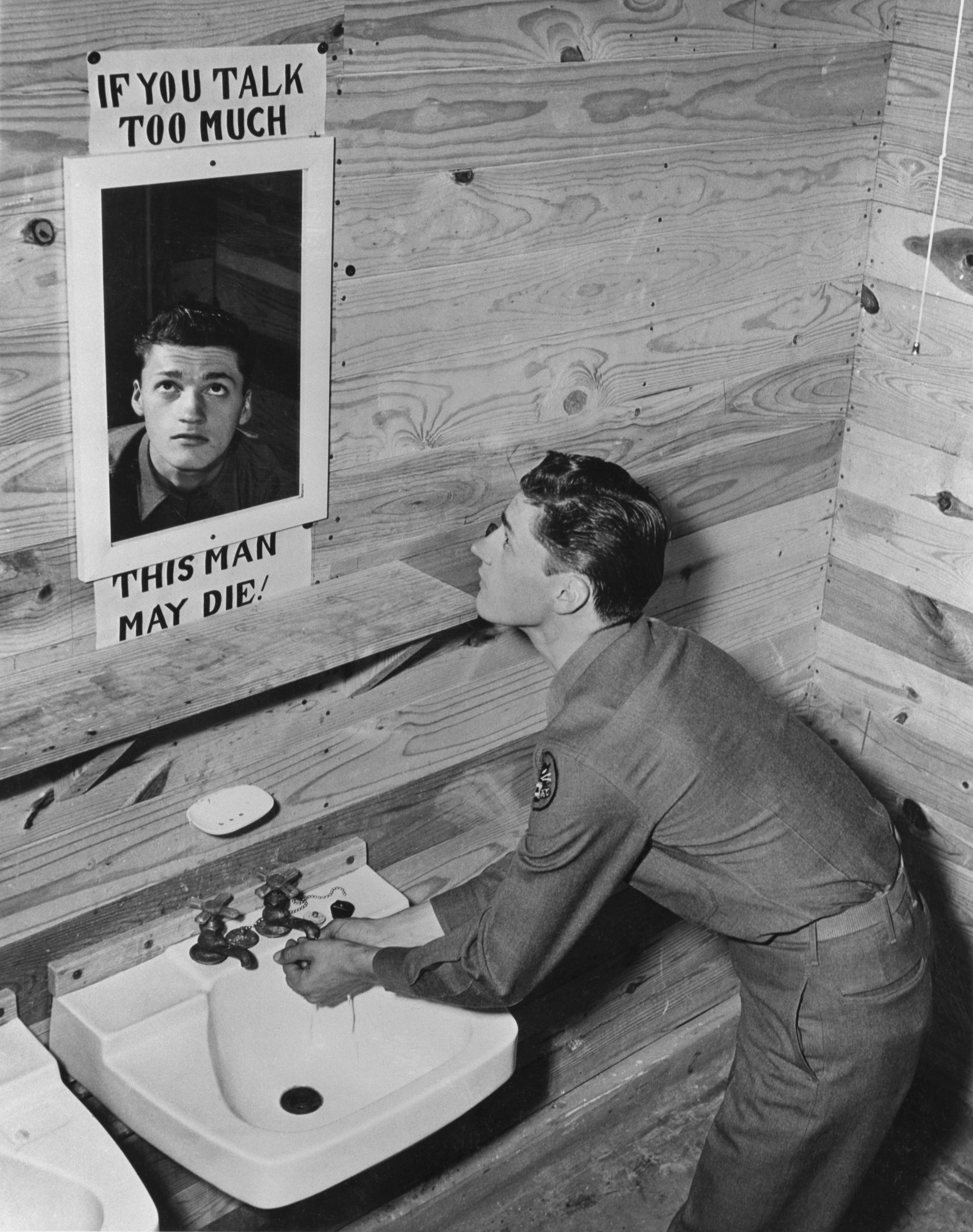
U.S. soldier at camp during World War II

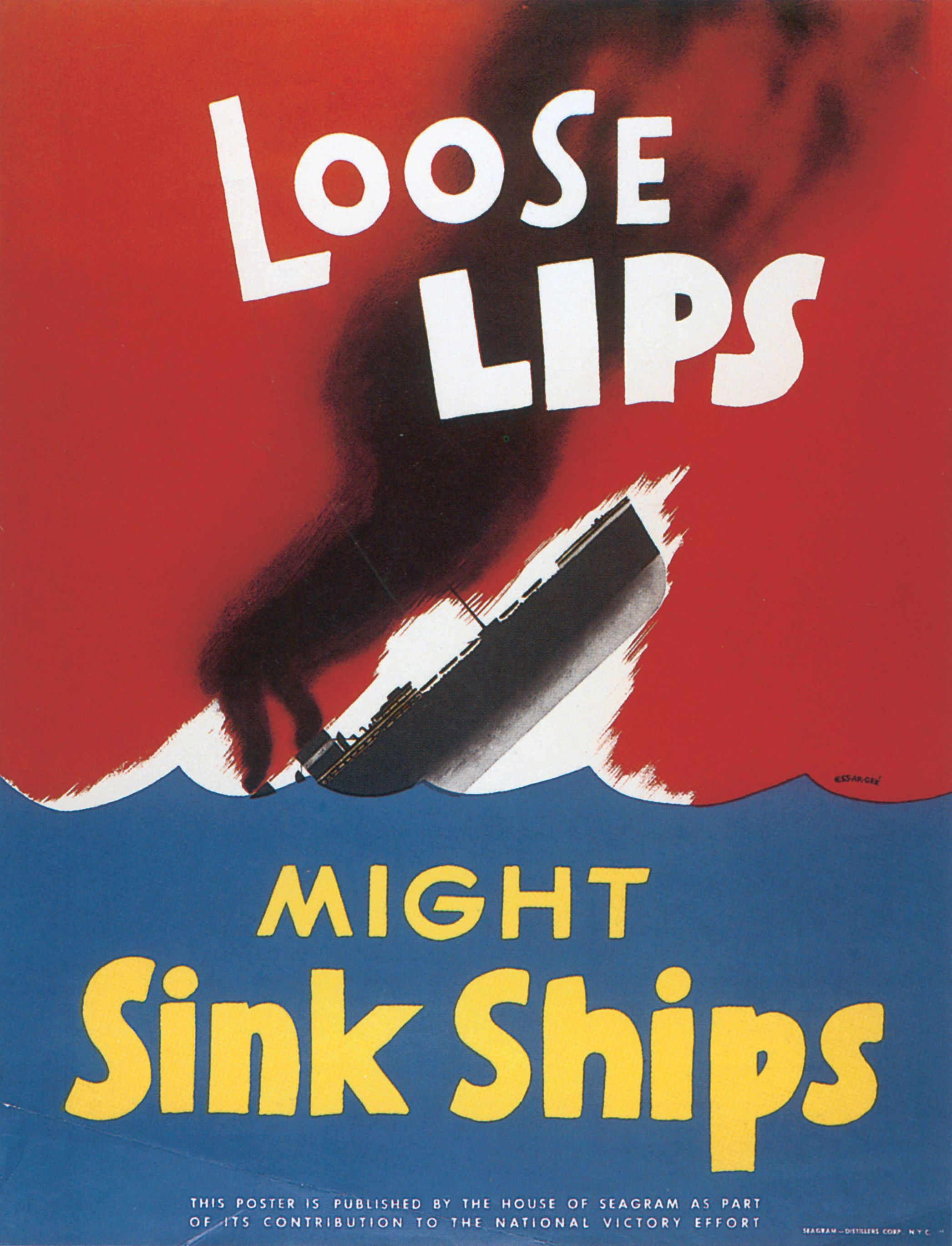
Loose lips might sink ships, World War II slogan

Secrecy is the practice of hiding information from certain individuals or groups who do not have the "need to know", perhaps while sharing it with other individuals. That which is kept hidden is known as the secret.

Secrecy is often controversial, depending on the content or nature of the secret, the group or people keeping the secret, and the motivation for secrecy.

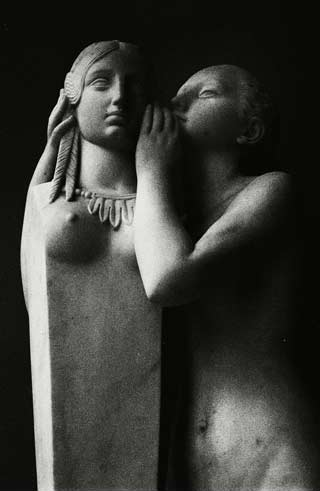
The First Secret Confided to Venus, François Jouffroy

Secrecy by government entities is often decried as excessive or in promotion of poor operation; excessive revelation of information on individuals can conflict with virtues of privacy and confidentiality. It is often contrasted with social transparency.

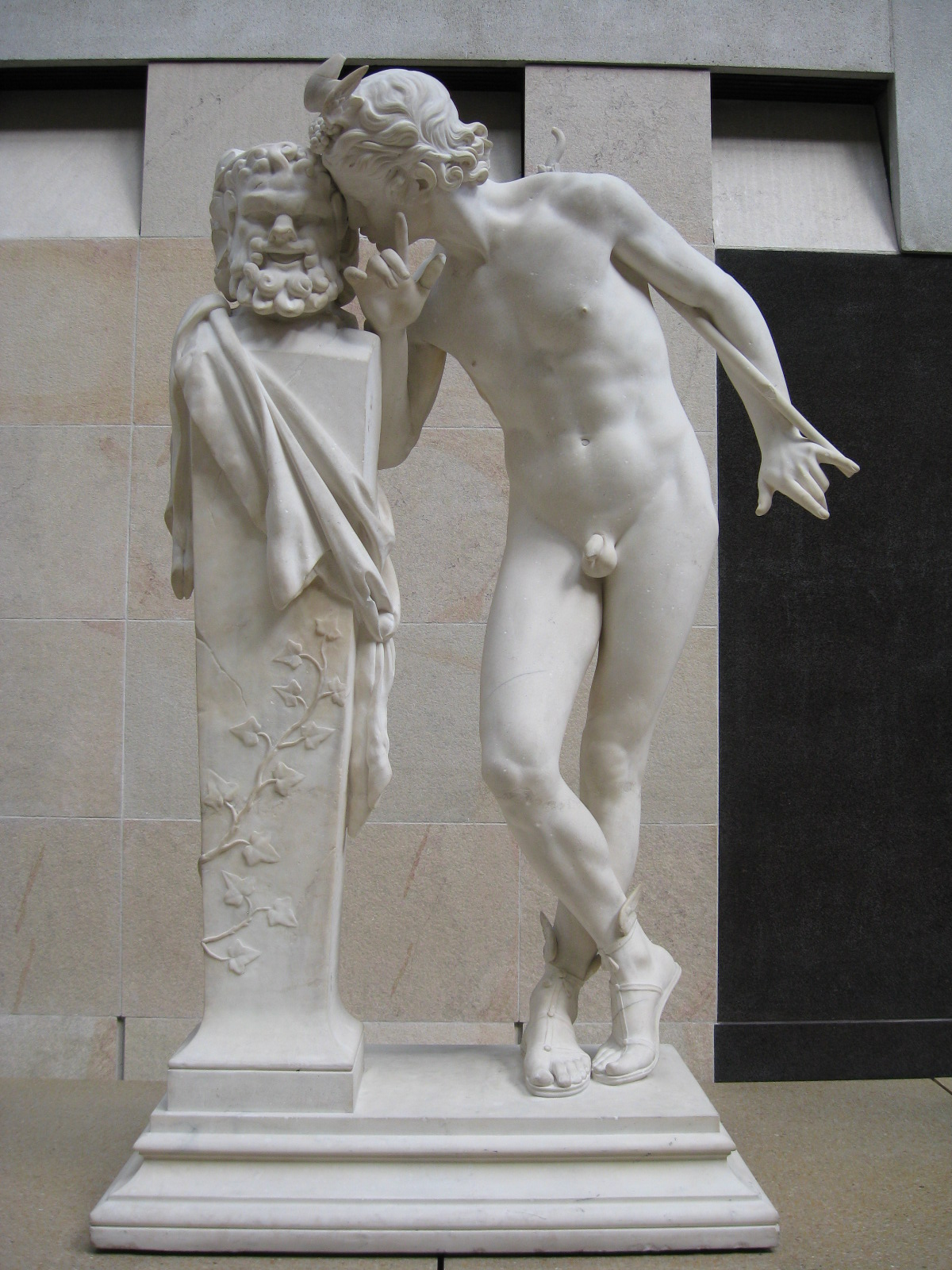
A Secret from on High (Secret d'en haut), Hippolyte Moulin (Hypolite Moulin), 1879

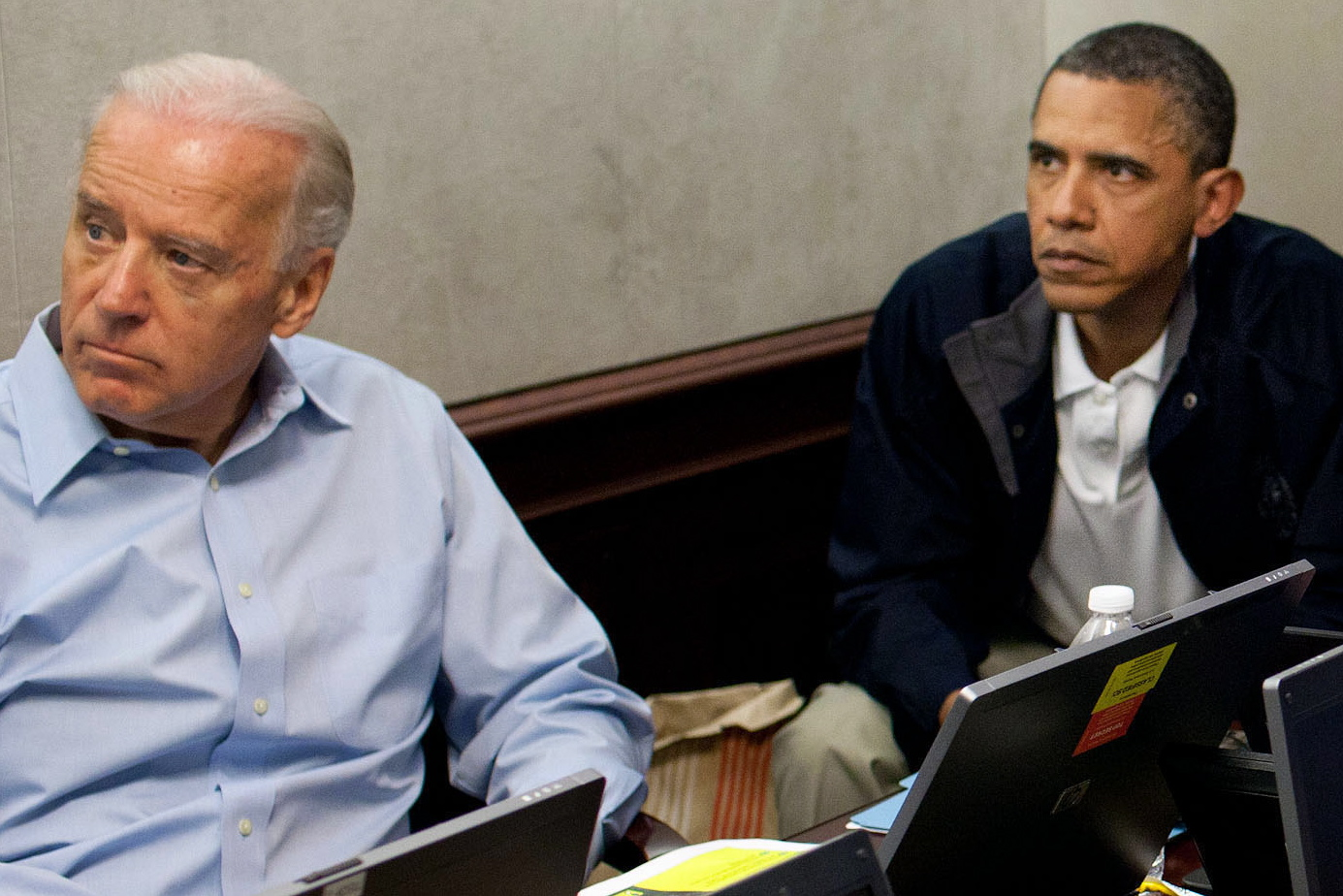
A burn bag and security classification stickers on a laptop, between U.S.President Barack Obama and Vice President Joe Biden, May 1, 2011

Secrecy can exist in a number of different ways: encoding or encryption (where mathematical and technical strategies are used to hide messages), true secrecy (where restrictions are put upon those who take part of the message, such as through government security classification) and obfuscation, where secrets are hidden in plain sight behind complex idiosyncratic language (jargon) or steganography.

Another classification proposed by Claude Shannon in 1948 reads that there are three systems of secrecy within communication:

1. Concealment systems, including such methods as invisible ink, concealing a message in a harmless text in a fake covering cryptogram, or other methods in which the existence of the message is concealed from the enemy.
2. Privacy systems, for example, voice inversion, is a special equipment required to recover the message.
3. "True" secrecy systems where the meaning of the message is concealed by the cypher, code, etc. Although, its existence is not hidden. The enemy is assumed to have any special equipment necessary to intercept and record the transmitted signal.

== Sociology ==
Animals conceal the location of their den or nest from predators. Squirrels bury nuts, hiding them, and they try to remember their locations later.

Humans attempt to consciously conceal aspects of themselves from others due to shame, or from fear of violence, rejection, harassment, loss of acceptance, or loss of employment. Humans may also attempt to conceal aspects of their own self which they are not capable of incorporating psychologically into their conscious being. Families sometimes maintain "family secrets", obliging family members never to discuss disagreeable issues concerning the family with outsiders or sometimes even within the family. Many "family secrets" are maintained by using a mutually agreed-upon construct (an official family story) when speaking with outside members. Agreement to maintain the secret is often coerced through "shaming" and reference to family honor. The information may even be something as trivial as a recipe.

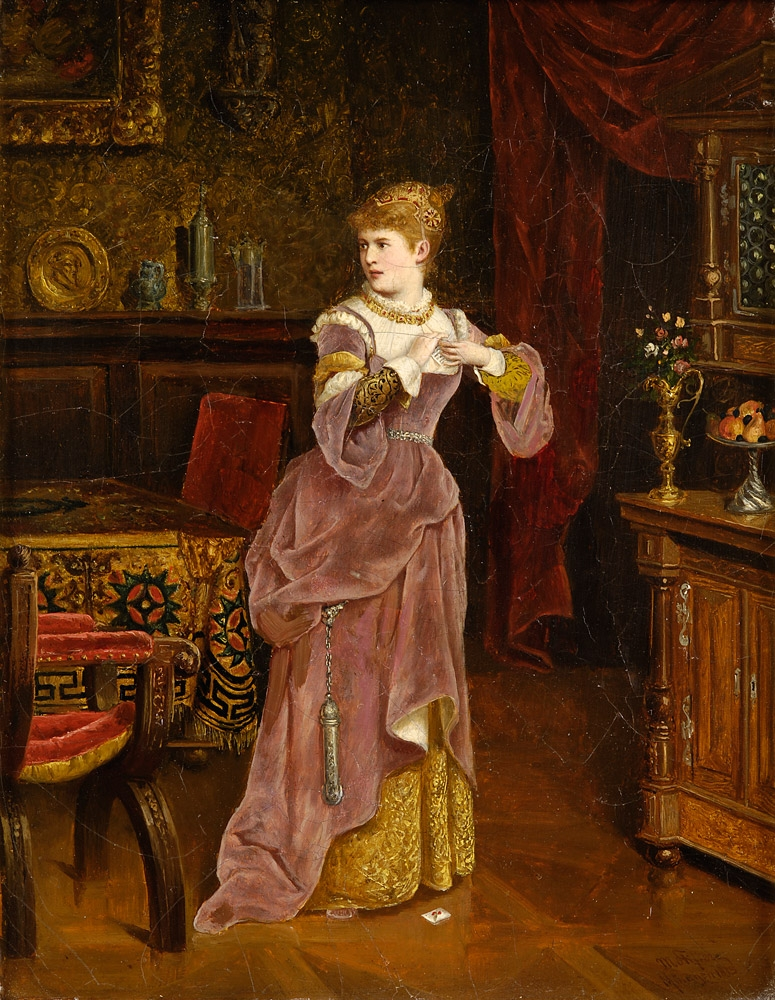
The Secret (Das Geheimnis) by Moritz Stifter, 1885

Secrets are sometimes kept to provide the pleasure of surprise. This includes keeping secret about a surprise party, not telling spoilers of a story, and avoiding exposure of a magic trick.

Keeping one's strategy secret – is important in many aspects of game theory.

In anthropology secret sharing is one way for people to establish traditional relations with other people. A commonly used narrative that describes this kind of behavior is Joseph Conrad's short story "The Secret Sharer".

== Government ==
Governments often attempt to conceal information from other governments and the public. These state secrets can include weapon designs, military plans, diplomatic negotiation tactics, and secrets obtained illicitly from others ("intelligence"). Most nations have some form of Official Secrets Act (the Espionage Act in the U.S.) and classify material according to the level of protection needed (hence the term "classified information"). An individual needs a security clearance for access and other protection methods, such as keeping documents in a safe, are stipulated.

Few people dispute the desirability of keeping Critical Nuclear Weapon Design Information secret, but many believe government secrecy to be excessive and too often employed for political purposes. Many countries have laws that attempt to limit government secrecy, such as the U.S. Freedom of Information Act and sunshine laws. Government officials sometimes leak information they are supposed to keep secret. (For a recent (2005) example, see Plame affair.)

Secrecy in elections is a growing issue, particularly secrecy of vote counts on computerized vote counting machines. While voting, citizens are acting in a unique sovereign or "owner" capacity (instead of being a subject of the laws, as is true outside of elections) in selecting their government servants. It is argued that secrecy is impermissible as against the public in the area of elections where the government gets all of its power and taxing authority. In any event, permissible secrecy varies significantly with the context involved.

== Corporations ==
Organizations, ranging from multi-national for profit corporations to nonprofit charities, keep secrets for competitive advantage, to meet legal requirements, or, in some cases, to conceal nefarious behavior. New products under development, unique manufacturing techniques, or simply lists of customers are types of information protected by trade secret laws.

Research on corporate secrecy has studied the factors supporting secret organizations. In particular, scholars in economics and management have paid attention to the way firms participating in cartels work together to maintain secrecy and conceal their activities from antitrust authorities. The diversity of the participants (in terms of age and size of the firms) influences their ability to coordinate to avoid being detected.

The patent system encourages inventors to publish information in exchange for a limited time monopoly on its use, though patent applications are initially secret. Secret societies use secrecy as a way to attract members by creating a sense of importance.

Shell companies may be used to launder money from criminal activity, to finance terrorism, or to evade taxes. Registers of beneficial ownership aim at fighting corporate secrecy in that sense.

Other laws require organizations to keep certain information secret, such as medical records (HIPAA in the U.S.), or financial reports that are under preparation (to limit insider trading). Europe has particularly strict laws about database privacy.

== Computing ==
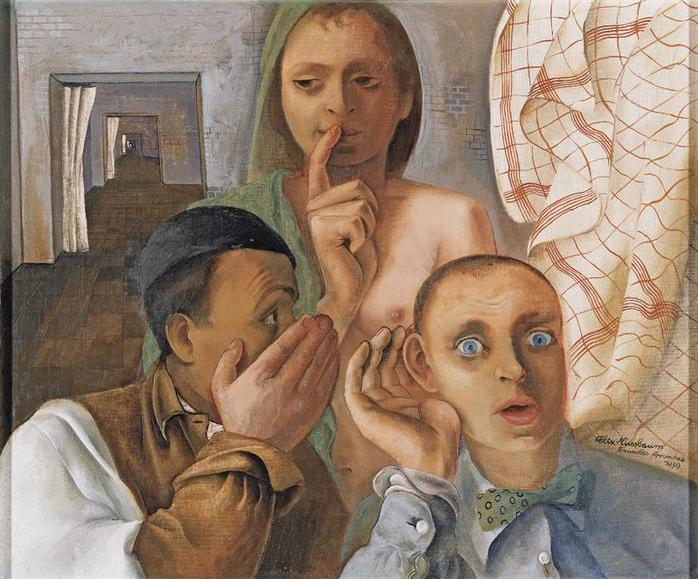
Das Geheimnis (The Secret) (Le secret), Felix Nussbaum

Preservation of secrets is one of the goals of information security. Techniques used include physical security and cryptography. The latter depends on the secrecy of cryptographic keys. Many believe that security technology can be more effective if it itself is not kept secret.

Information hiding is a design principle in much software engineering. It is considered easier to verify software reliability if one can be sure that different parts of the program can only access (and therefore depend on) a known limited amount of information.

== Military ==
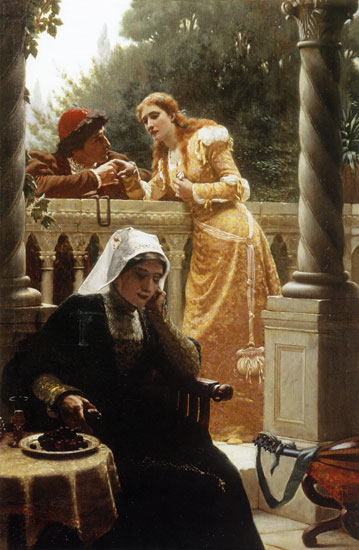
A Stolen Interview, Edmund Blair Leighton

Military secrecy is the concealing of information about martial affairs that is purposely not made available to the general public and hence to any enemy, in order to gain an advantage or to not reveal a weakness, to avoid embarrassment, or to help in propaganda efforts. Most military secrets are tactical in nature, such as the strengths and weaknesses of weapon systems, tactics, training methods, plans, and the number and location of specific weapons. Some secrets involve information in broader areas, such as secure communications, cryptography, intelligence operations, and cooperation with third parties.

US Government rights in regard to military secrecy were uphold in the landmark legal case of United States v. Reynolds, decided by the Supreme Court in 1953.

== Views ==
Excessive secrecy is often cited as a source of much human conflict. One may have to lie in order to hold a secret, which might lead to psychological repercussions. The alternative, declining to answer when asked something, may suggest the answer and may therefore not always be suitable for keeping a secret. Also, the other may insist that one answer the question.

Nearly 2500 years ago, Sophocles wrote: "Do nothing secretly; for Time sees and hears all things, and discloses all.". Gautama Siddhartha said: "Three things cannot long stay hidden: the sun, the moon and the truth.".

== See also ==
- Ambiguity
- Banking secrecy
- Black project
- Clandestine cell system
- Classified information
- Concealment device
- Confidentiality
- Conspiracy theory
- Covert operation
- Cover-up
- Deception
- Don't ask, don't tell
- Espionage
- Freedom of information legislation
- Media transparency
- Need to know
- Open secret
- Secrecy (sociology)
- Secrecy, Power, Ignorance research Network
- Secret passage
- Secret sharing
- Self-concealment
- Somebody else's problem
- Smuggling
- State secrets privilege
- Sub rosa
- WikiLeaks
