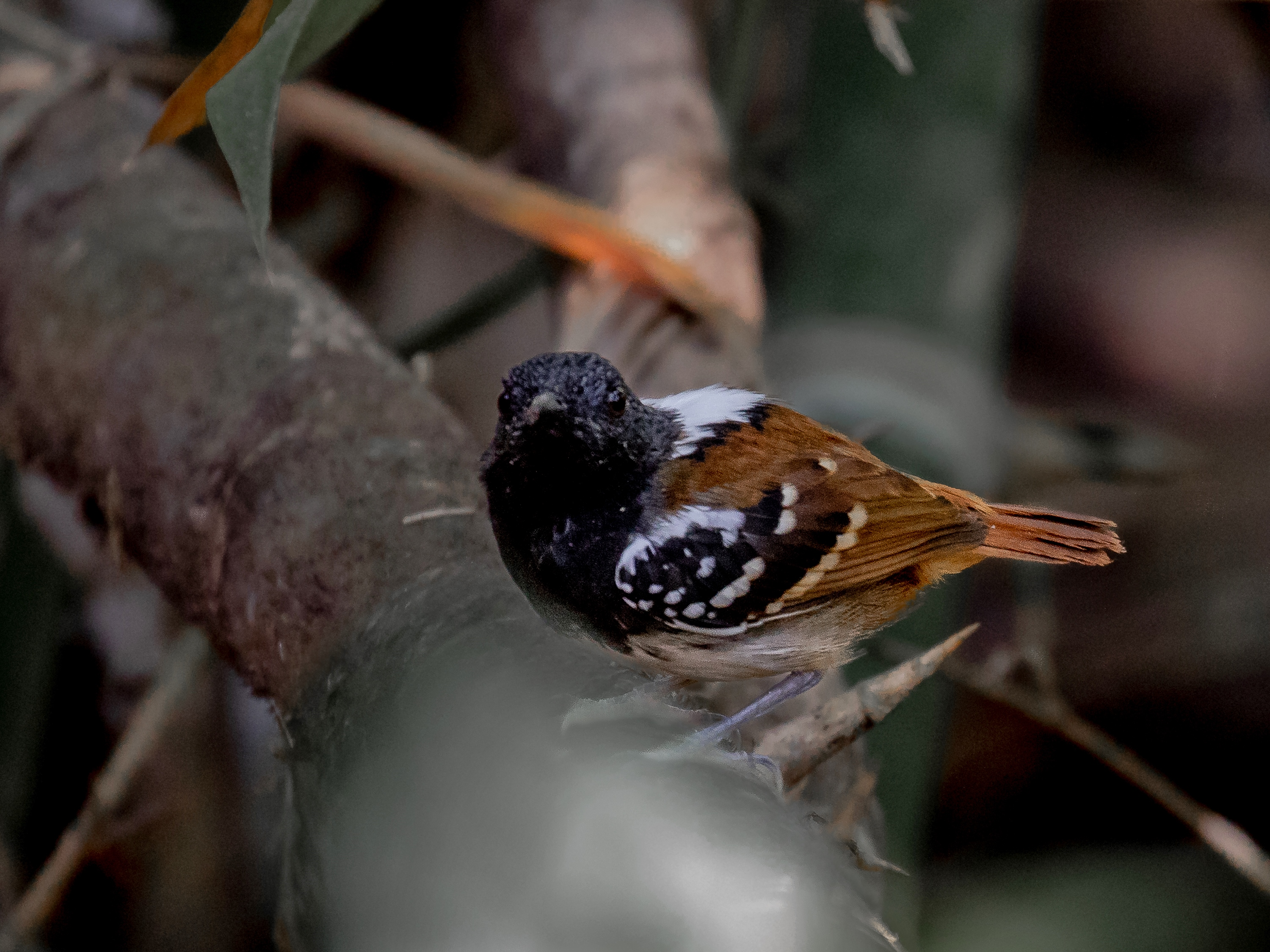
- Male southern chestnut-tailed antbird (Sciaphylax hemimelaena); Rio Branco, Acre

Scientific classification
- Kingdom: Animalia
- Phylum: Chordata
- Class: Aves
- Order: Passeriformes
- Family: Thamnophilidae
- Genus: Sciaphylax; Bravo, Isler & Brumfield, 2013

Type species
- Sciaphylax hemimelaena Sclater, PL, 1857

Species
- Sciaphylax castanea; Sciaphylax hemimelaena

= Sciaphylax =

Genus of birds

Sciaphylax is a genus of passerine birds in the family Thamnophilidae.

The genus contains two species:

- Southern chestnut-tailed antbird (Sciaphylax hemimelaena)
- Northern chestnut-tailed antbird (Sciaphylax castanea)

These species were formerly included in the genus Myrmeciza. A molecular phylogenetic study published in 2013 found that Myrmeciza was polyphyletic. In the resulting rearrangement to create monophyletic genera, the two chestnut-tailed antbirds was moved to a newly erected genus Sciaphylax. The type species is the southern chestnut-tailed antbird. The name of the new genus combines the Ancient Greek words skia "shadow" and phylax "a watcher".

Sciaphylax occur in non-overlapping regions. Species in this genus are known for their reddish to chestnut plumage, short tails, and sexually dimorphic features. They typically forage near the ground, often alone or in pairs, capturing insects through perch-gleaning and short leaps.

Their vocalisations include loudsongs and brief call notes, which differ between species and show geographic variation, particularly in S. hemimelaena. The nests are open cups, usually supported by palm leaves or forest debris, and only females have been observed to incubate the eggs. Molecular phylogenetic studies have identified Sciaphylax as a sister genus to Cercomacroides, and both belong to a clade separate from traditional Cercomacra. While S. hemimelaena is relatively common and occurs in several protected or undisturbed areas, S. castanea has a more restricted distribution and may be vulnerable due to habitat degradation and limited scientific attention.

== Taxonomy and systematics ==
Based on mitochondrial and nuclear DNA sequences, molecular phylogenetic investigations have identified Sciaphylax as the sister genus to Cercomacroides, which is a recently established genus including numerous species previously classified under Cercomacra. These two genera are part of the same clade as Drymophila and Hypocnemis. However, they are more distantly related to Cercomacra.

== Description ==
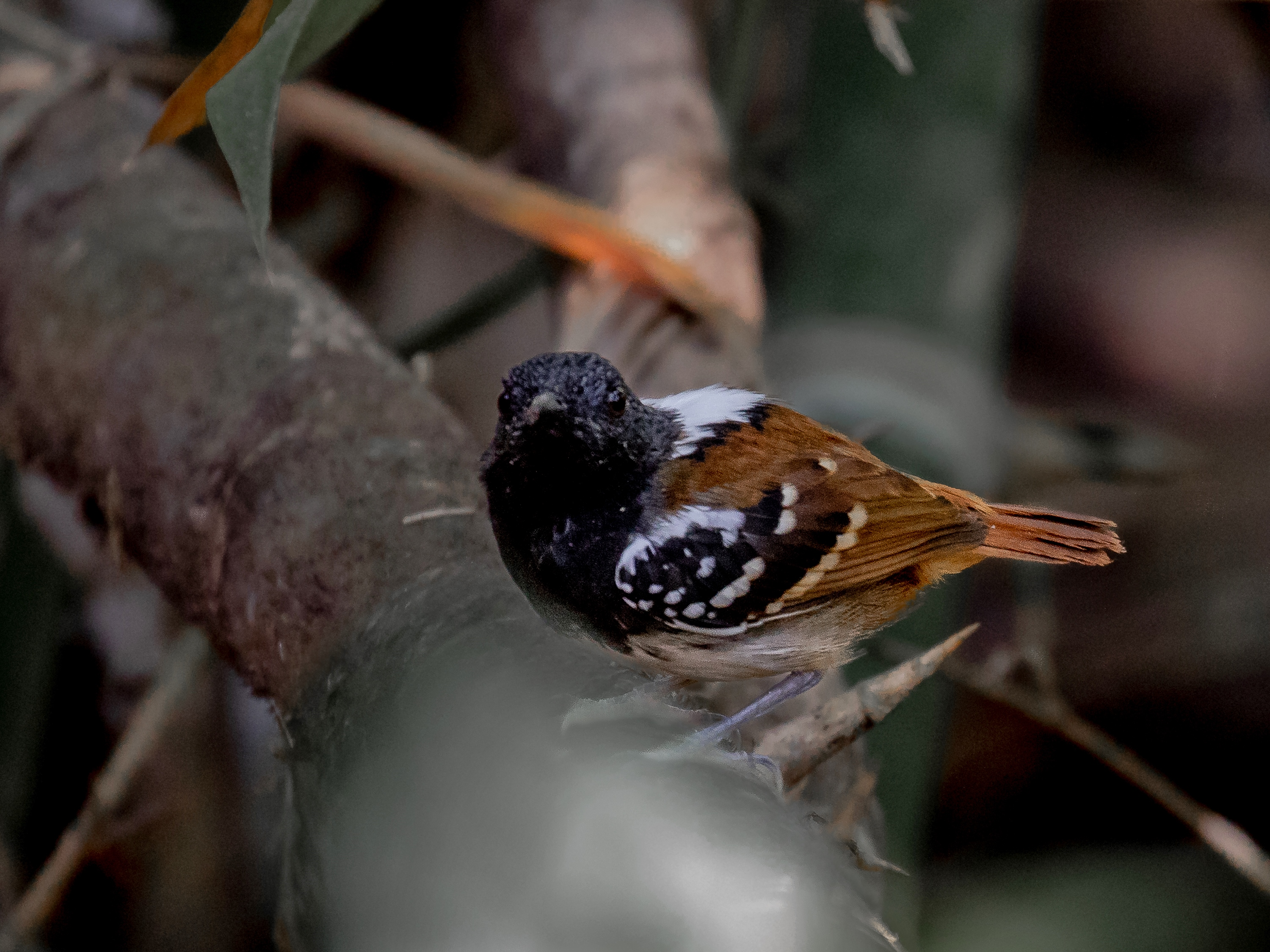
Sciaphylax hemimelaena

The genus Sciaphylax is composed of small-bodied birds with relatively short, thin tails and body proportions. These antbirds typically weigh between 14.5 and 17 g (0.5 and 0.6 oz) and have a body length ranging from 11 to 12 cm (4.3 to 4.7 in). They are known for their distinct reddish to chestnut colouration. Sciaphylax antbirds generally exhibit a dark reddish to yellowish chestnut colour on the upperparts. Male Sciaphylax tend to have brighter plumage with black and white markings, while females show softer, more muted tones. Distinctive features include black wing coverts with noticeable pale tips, a pale scapular patch with black subterminal dots, and differing degrees of black on the neck and chest in males. Their prominent wing covert patterns and reddish-brown colouration extending toward the end of the body, including the tail. The tail is typically concolorous with the central underparts, particularly in males, and may appear paler in contrast with the darker upperparts.

== Distribution and habitat ==
Members of the genus Sciaphylax have been found in eastern Peru, the southwest of Brazil, the south of Colombia, the east of Ecuador, and the north of Bolivia. The distribution of the two species do not overlap. The southern chestnut-tailed antbird (Sciaphylax hemimelaena) is found in the southwestern to central Amazonian Brazil (from the east of Madeira River to southwestern Pará, south to Rondônia, south to Acre, and western and northern Mato Grosso), as well as north Bolivia (east and west Santa Cruz, Pando, La Paz, Western Beni, and Cochabamba). The northern chestnut-tailed antbird (Sciaphylax castanea) is distributed in the north of Peru (Loreto, San Martín), east of Ecuador (Zamora-Chinchipe, Napo, and Pastaza), as well as extreme southern Colombia (Putumayo).

Species of Sciaphylax have been observed moving between forest interior and treefall gaps.

Both species typically inhabit the understory of lowland and foothills evergreen forests below 1,350 m (4,430 ft) above sea level.

== Behavior ==
They are typically active during the daytime hours.

Members of the genus Sciaphylax produce loudsong, which consist of a rapid sequences of whistled notes. These songs are characterized by distinct pitch and tempo, often ending with an unexpected or harsh note. Both species' calls consist of brief, frequently modulated "chirr" note, as well as abrupt "chak" or "pit" notes repeated in short sequences.

Myrmeciza castanea - Northern Chestnut-tailed Antbird XC251209

== Conservation status ==
According to the IUCN, species in the genus Sciaphylax are not currently considered globally threatened. S. hemimelaena is regarded as relatively common throughout its range. Populations were recorded in several large and protected areas, including Manu National Park and Tambopata-Candamo in Peru, Cristalino State Park in Brazil, and Madidi National Park in Bolivia. S. hemimelaena can be found in extensive areas of forest. Although these areas are not technically protected, they are still relatively undisturbed and currently face limited development pressure.

On the other hand, the distribution of S. castanea is more limited than of S. hemimelaena. Its conservation status needs to be evaluated further. The species has received few scientific attentions. S. castanea was only recently recognized as an individual species. The nominate subspecies occurs in restricted regions that has been heavily impacted by human activity, including forest clearing for fuel, agriculture area and settlement.

Similar conditions threaten Herpsilochmus parkeri. It is another thamnophilid that is largely restricted to this region. This species is also listed as Endangered. The lowland subspecies Centunculorum is less geographically restricted than other subspecies, but it remains patchily distributed.

In response to these threats, the Peruvian government established the Allpahuayo-Mishana Reserved Zone in 1999. This is a significant step towards protecting the vulnerable white-sand ecosystems of north Amazonian Peru. Continued conservation of this region is crucial for maintaining sustainable populations of S. castanea.
