= Chestnut-tailed antbird =

The chestnut-tailed antbird has been split into two species:

- Southern chestnut-tailed antbird, Myrmeciza hemimelaena
- Northern chestnut-tailed antbird, Myrmeciza castanea
