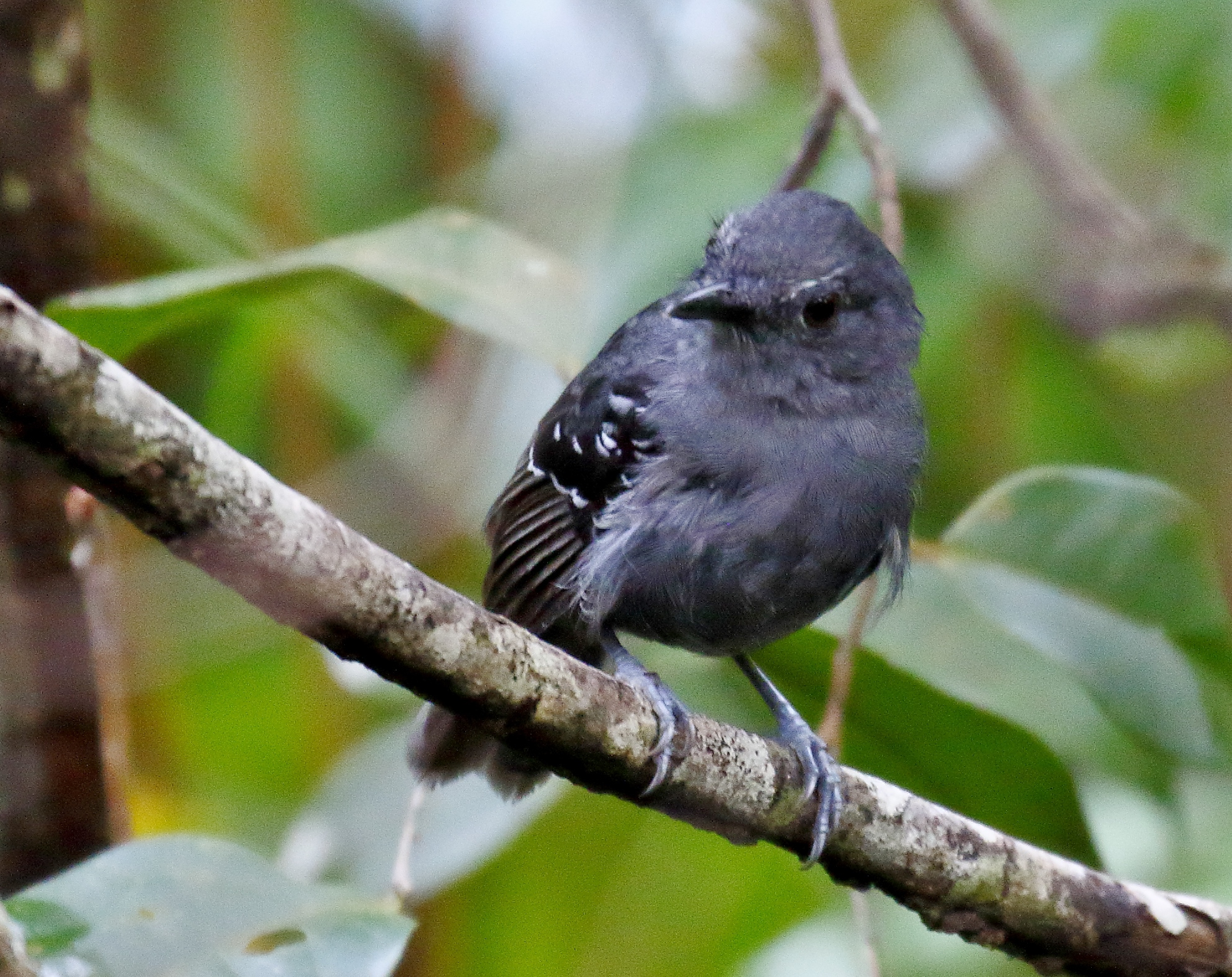
- Male at Barra de São Miguel, Alagoas, Brazil

Conservation status
- Least Concern (IUCN 3.1)

Scientific classification
- Kingdom: Animalia
- Phylum: Chordata
- Class: Aves
- Order: Passeriformes
- Family: Thamnophilidae
- Genus: Cercomacroides
- Species: C. laeta

Binomial name
- Cercomacroides laeta (Todd, 1920)

Synonyms
- Cercomacra tyrannina laeta; Cercomacra laeta

= Willis's antbird =

Species of bird

Willis's antbird (Cercomacroides laeta), also known as the laeta antbird, is a species of bird in subfamily Thamnophilinae of family Thamnophilidae, the "typical antbirds". It is found in Brazil and Guyana.

== Taxonomy and systematics ==
Willis's antbird was described by the American ornithologist W. E. Clyde Todd in 1920 as a subspecies of the dusky antbird and given the trinomial name Cercomacra tyrannina laeta. A 1997 study found that Willis's antbird differed from the dusky antbird in both plumage and voice and as a result, Willis's antbird was promoted to species status. The 1997 paper suggested its English name to commemorate the American ornithologist Edwin O'Neill Willis.

A molecular phylogenetic study published in 2014 found that Cercomacra was polyphyletic. The genus was split to create two monophyletic genera, and six species including Willis's antbird were moved to the newly erected genus Cercomacroides.

Willis's antbird has three subspecies, the nominate C. l. laeta (Todd, 1920), C. l. waimiri (Bierregaard, Cohn-Haft & Stotz, 1997), and C. l. sabinoi (Pinto, 1939).

== Description ==
Willis's antbird is 13.5 to 14.5 cm (5.3 to 5.7 in) long and weighs 15 to 17 g (0.53 to 0.60 oz). Males of the nominate subspecies are almost entirely gray, with somewhat lighter underparts than upperparts. They have a white patch between their scapulars and narrow white tips on their wing coverts and outer tail feathers. Females have olive-gray upperparts and ear coverts, browner wings and tail, and cinnamon edges on their wing coverts. They have a very small white interscapular patch. Their throat and underparts are tawny-buff with an olive tinge to their flanks. Males of subspecies C. l. waimiri are a darker gray than the nominate and do not have white tips on the tail feathers. Females have orange-cinnamon ear coverts and dark gray wing coverts with wide cinnamon-brown edges. Males of subspecies C. l. sabinoi are like nominate males; females have pale cinnamon underparts.

== Distribution and habitat ==
Willis's antbird has a disjunct distribution; the subspecies' ranges are significantly separated from each other. Subspecies C. l. waimiri is the westernmost. It is found in north-central Amazonian Brazil where eastern Roraima, northeastern Amazonas, and northwestern Pará meet and also into southern Guyana. The nominate subspecies is found in southeastern Amazonian Brazil, in eastern Pará and western Maranhão. Subspecies C. l. sabinoi is found in the coastal eastern Brazilian states of Pernambuco and Alagoas.

In general, Willis's antbird inhabits the understorey at the edges of evergreen forest and also mature secondary forest, usually near water. The nominate subspecies favors the edges of várzea and forest along small streams. Subspecies C. l. waimiri favors campina woodlands on white sand soil, especially along streams and in swampy areas. C. l. sabinoi favors the edges of secondary forest and densely vegetated openings in the forest interior such as those made by fallen trees. It is less tied to water features than the other two subspecies. In elevation C. l. sabinoi reaches 600 m (2,000 ft); the other two subspecies reach only 300 m (1,000 ft).

== Behavior ==
=== Movement ===
Willis's antbird is believed to be a year-round resident throughout its range.

=== Feeding ===
The diet of Willis's antbird has not been detailed but is known to include a variety of insects and spiders. Single birds, pairs, and family groups usually forage on the ground or within about 3 m (10 ft) of it. It typically hops through dense vegetation, taking prey from vegetation by gleaning, reaching, lunging, and making short fluttery flights from a perch. It seldom joins mixed-species feeding flocks, and occasionally attends army ant swarms but spends little time with them.

=== Breeding ===
The breeding season of Willis's antbird includes February and March in Pará but is otherwise unknown. Nests there were bags woven from plant fibers hung in dense vegetation near the ground. The known clutches were of two white eggs with dark spots and streaks. A female was seen incubating a clutch. The incubation period, time to fledging, and other details of parental care are not known.

=== Vocalization ===
The song of the male Willis's antbird is a "very high, short, very sharp 'puh-wéedi-wéedi-wéedih'"; the "wéedi" is repeated two to five times. Females answer with "a short series of usually 4 notes, notes initially longer than those of male but becoming shorter and rising in pitch"; they may begin singing during the male's song.

== Status ==
The IUCN has assessed Willis's antbird as being of Least Concern. Its population size is not known but is believed to be stable. No immediate threats have been identified. The nominate subspecies is considered locally fairly common, C. l. waimiri is considered uncommon, and C. l. sabinoi appears to be rare and local. "The ability of all races to exploit second-growth and edge habitats probably renders this species less vulnerable to disturbance than are most antbirds."
