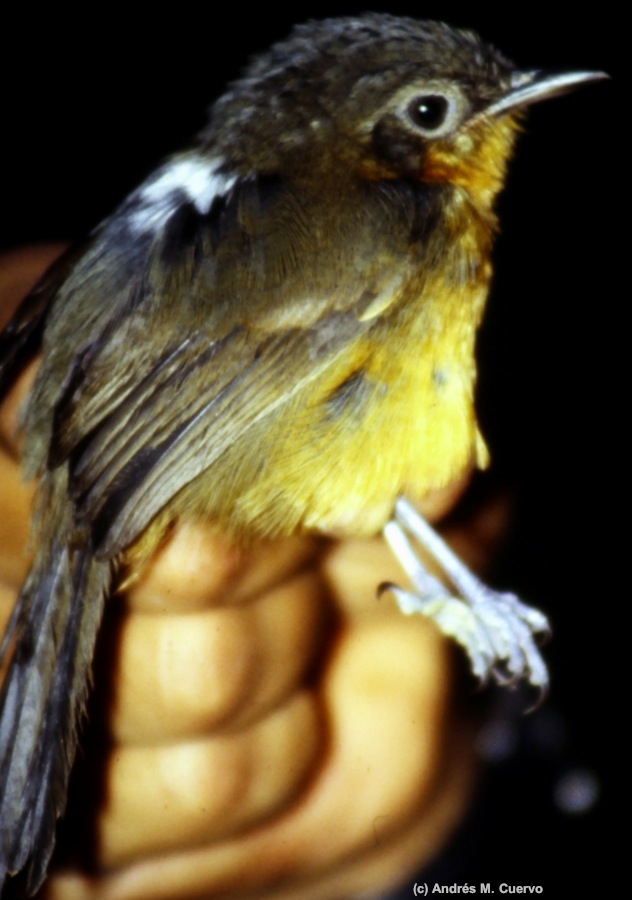

Conservation status
- Least Concern (IUCN 3.1)

Scientific classification
- Kingdom: Animalia
- Phylum: Chordata
- Class: Aves
- Order: Passeriformes
- Family: Thamnophilidae
- Genus: Cercomacroides
- Species: C. parkeri

Binomial name
- Cercomacroides parkeri (Graves, GR, 1997)

Synonyms
- Cercomacra parkeri

= Parker's antbird =

Species of bird

Parker's antbird (Cercomacroides parkeri) is a species of passerine bird in subfamily Thamnophilinae of family Thamnophilidae, the "typical antbirds". It is endemic to Colombia.

== Taxonomy and systematics ==
The type specimen of what is now Parker's antbird was collected in 1951 but not recognized as a species at that time. The American ornithologist Gary Graves studied it and other specimens and in 1997 formally described it as a species, Cercomacra parkeri. Graves chose the specific epithet and English name to honor the American ornithologist Theodore A. Parker III (1953—1993), "the most talented field ornithologist of our generation". A molecular phylogenetic study published in 2014 found that genus Cercomacra was polyphyletic. The genus was therefore split to create two monophyletic genera, and six species including Parker's antbird were moved to the newly erected genus Cercomacroides. Parker's antbird is monotypic.

== Description ==
Parker's antbird is 13.5 to 15 cm (5.3 to 5.9 in) long. Males are almost entirely slate gray, with somewhat lighter underparts than upperparts. They have a hidden white patch between their scapulars and narrow white tips on their wing coverts and outer tail feathers. Their flanks have an olivaceous tinge. Females have an olive brown or olive brown tinged gray crown and ear coverts, a paler olive brown supercilium, and gray lores. Their upperparts, wings, and tail are olive brown. They have a very small or no interscapular patch. Their throat and underparts are tawny buff or cinnamon rufous. Both sexes have a rich chocolate brown iris, a brownish black maxilla, a horn-colored mandible with a brownish black tomium, and brownish black legs and feet.

== Distribution and habitat ==
Parker's antbird is found on the western slope of Colombia's Western Andes, the northern and eastern slopes of the Central Andes, and the western slope of the Eastern Andes. It inhabits the understorey and edges of humid subtropical montane forest, nearby secondary forest, and bamboo thickets in both forest types. In elevation it ranges between 1,100 and 1,950 m (3,600 and 6,400 ft).

== Behavior ==
=== Movement ===
Parker's antbird is believed to be a year-round resident throughout its range.

=== Feeding ===
The diet of Parker's antbird has not been detailed but is known to include a variety of insects; it appears to favor beetles. Single birds, pairs, and family groups usually forage low to the ground but do feed into the forest mid-storey. It typically hops through dense vegetation, taking prey from vegetation mostly by gleaning from a perch. It seldom joins mixed-species feeding flocks.

=== Breeding ===
The breeding season of Parker's antbird is not known but appears to include at least April to July. Nothing else is known about the species' breeding biology.

=== Vocalization ===
The song of the male Parker's antbird is "a muted note followed by higher-pitched, more intense series initially flat in pitch, then descending and accelerating as final notes shorten". Female song is shorter and has a higher pitch and downslurred notes. Its calls include "a rapid sputter of notes and a short, nasal, descending note".

== Status ==
The IUCN has assessed Parker's antbird as being of Least Concern. It has a limited range and an unknown population size that is believed to be decreasing. No immediate threats have been identified. It is considered fairly common. "As is the case with all species that inhabit humid montane forest, Parker's Antbird is vulnerable to deforestation, which is a severe problem in the Colombian Andes. On the other hand, Parker's Antbird occurs in second growth and forest edges, and so is less vulnerable than are other species that are restricted to forest interior or intact forests."
