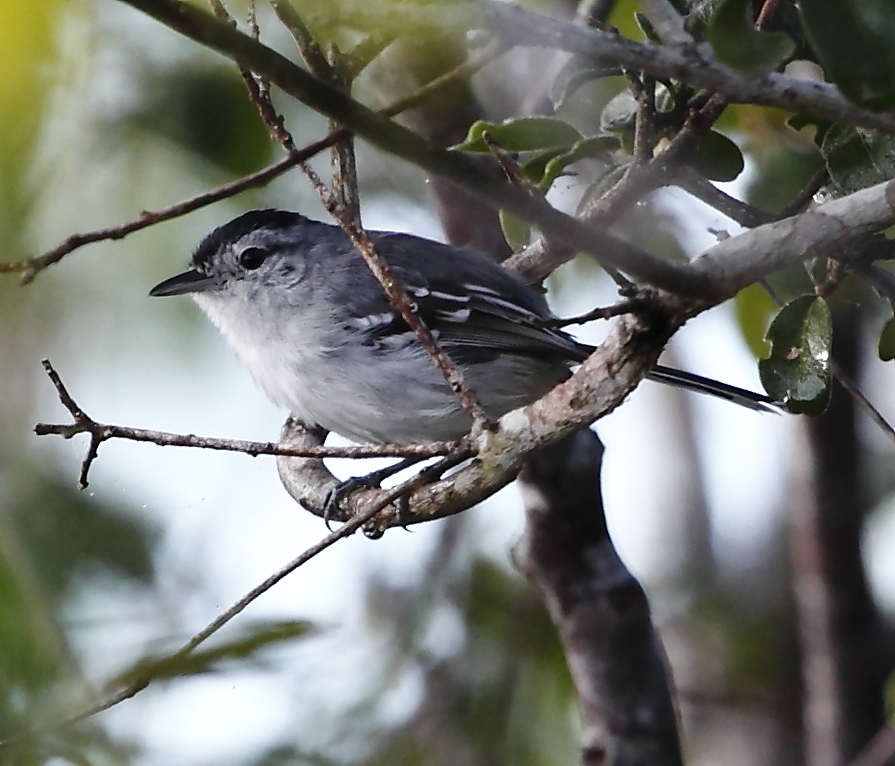
- Male Caatinga antwren in Crato, Ceará

Conservation status
- Least Concern (IUCN 3.1)

Scientific classification
- Kingdom: Animalia
- Phylum: Chordata
- Class: Aves
- Order: Passeriformes
- Family: Thamnophilidae
- Genus: Radinopsyche; Whitney et al., 2021
- Species: R. sellowi

Binomial name
- Radinopsyche sellowi (Whitney & Pacheco, 2000)

Synonyms
- Herpsilochmus sellowi Whitney, Pacheco, Buzzetti & Parrini, 2000

= Caatinga antwren =

Species of bird

The Caatinga antwren (Radinopsyche sellowi) is a species of bird in subfamily Thamnophilinae of family Thamnophilidae, the "typical antbirds". It is endemic to Brazil.

== Taxonomy and systematics ==
What is now the Caatinga antwren was originally described as Herpsilochmus sellowi after decades of being treated as part of the Bahia antwren (H. pileatus) complex. A study published in 2000 resulted in its recognition as a separate species. A 2021 phylogenetic analysis determined that the species did not belong in Herpsilochmus and the authors coined the new genus Radinopsyche for it. The South American Classification Committee of the American Ornithological Society, the International Ornithological Committee, and the Clements taxonomy soon adopted the new genus. However, as of December 2023 BirdLife International's Handbook of the Birds of the World retains the species in Herpsilochmus.

The Caatinga antwren's English name derives from its principal habitat. Its specific epithet honors Friedrich Sellow for his "important collections of natural history specimens from eastern Brazil, which numbered approximately 5,457 birds" and numerous mammals, invertebrates, plants, and geological materials.

The Caatinga antwren is the only member of its genus and has no subspecies.

== Description ==
The Caatinga antwren is 10.5 to 11.5 cm (4.1 to 4.5 in) long and weighs 6.5 to 8 g (0.23 to 0.28 oz). Adult males have a black crown and nape. They have white lores, a long white to pale gray supercilium, and a short blackish streak behind the eye on an otherwise gray face. Their upperparts are mostly gray with a white patch between the scapulars. Their outer scapulars are blackish with white edges. Their wings are mostly black with white edges on the flight feathers and white tips on the coverts. Their tail is mostly black with large white tips on all feathers and white edges on the outer ones. Their underparts are gray-tinged white. Females are similar to males, but with dull buff edges on their forehead feathers, a fainter streak behind the eye, an olive tinge to their upperparts, and a pale buff tinge to their underparts.

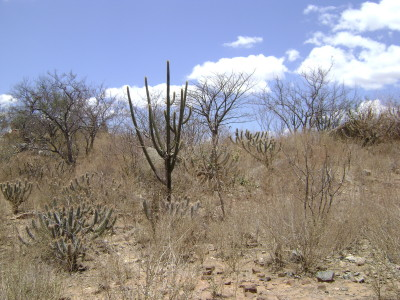
Caatinga

== Distribution and habitat ==
The Caatinga antwren is found in north-central and eastern Brazil, in southern Pará and from Maranhão east to Rio Grande do Norte and south to Bahia and just into northern Minas Gerais. As its English name suggests, it is found primarily in the Caatinga, an area of semi-arid tropical vegetation found only in northeastern Brazil. It occurs mostly in semi-deciduous woodlands and mata-de-cipó and also in the ecotone between caatinga and cerrado. It usually shuns humid evergreen forest and arid scublands. In elevation it ranges mostly between 300 and 900 m (1,000 and 3,000 ft) but occurs locally as high as 1,100 m (3,600 ft).

== Behavior ==
=== Movement ===
The Caatinga antwren is presumed to be a year-round resident throughout its range.

=== Feeding ===
The Caatinga antwren's diet has not been fully defined but is known to include a variety of insects and spiders. It forages singly, in pairs, and in small family groups and often joins mixed-species feeding flocks. It typically feeds in the forest's mid- to upper storeys up to about 12 m (40 ft) above the ground, though it feeds as low as 1.5 m (5 ft) at the edges of woodland and in mata-de-cipó. It hops through vegetation, gleaning prey from leaves and stems by reaching and with short horizontal lunges from a perch; it less often makes short upward sallies. It has not been observed following army ant swarms.

=== Breeding ===
Aside from a sighting of nearly fledged young in February, nothing is known about the Caatinga antwren's breeding biology.

=== Vocalization ===
The Caatinga antwren's song is a "very high, short, fast rattle, like 'wrrrrrru'; somewhat rising at start and lowered at end". It makes a call, "a short...repetition of wiip notes" and also a one-second rattle that is preceded by a "slightly longer downslurred note" and rises in pitch.

== Status ==
The IUCN originally in 2002 assessed the Caatinga antwren as Near Threatened and in 2011 downlisted it to being of Least Concern. It has a large range but occurs sporadically within it; its population size is not known and is believed to be decreasing. Its habitat is under pressure by conversion to human occupation, agriculture, ranching, and petroleum extraction. "The species's [sic] occurrence in secondary habitats, however, suggests that it is tolerant of some habitat degradation." It is considered uncommon to fairly common across its range and occurs in at least three protected areas. Most of its range, however, is not protected.
