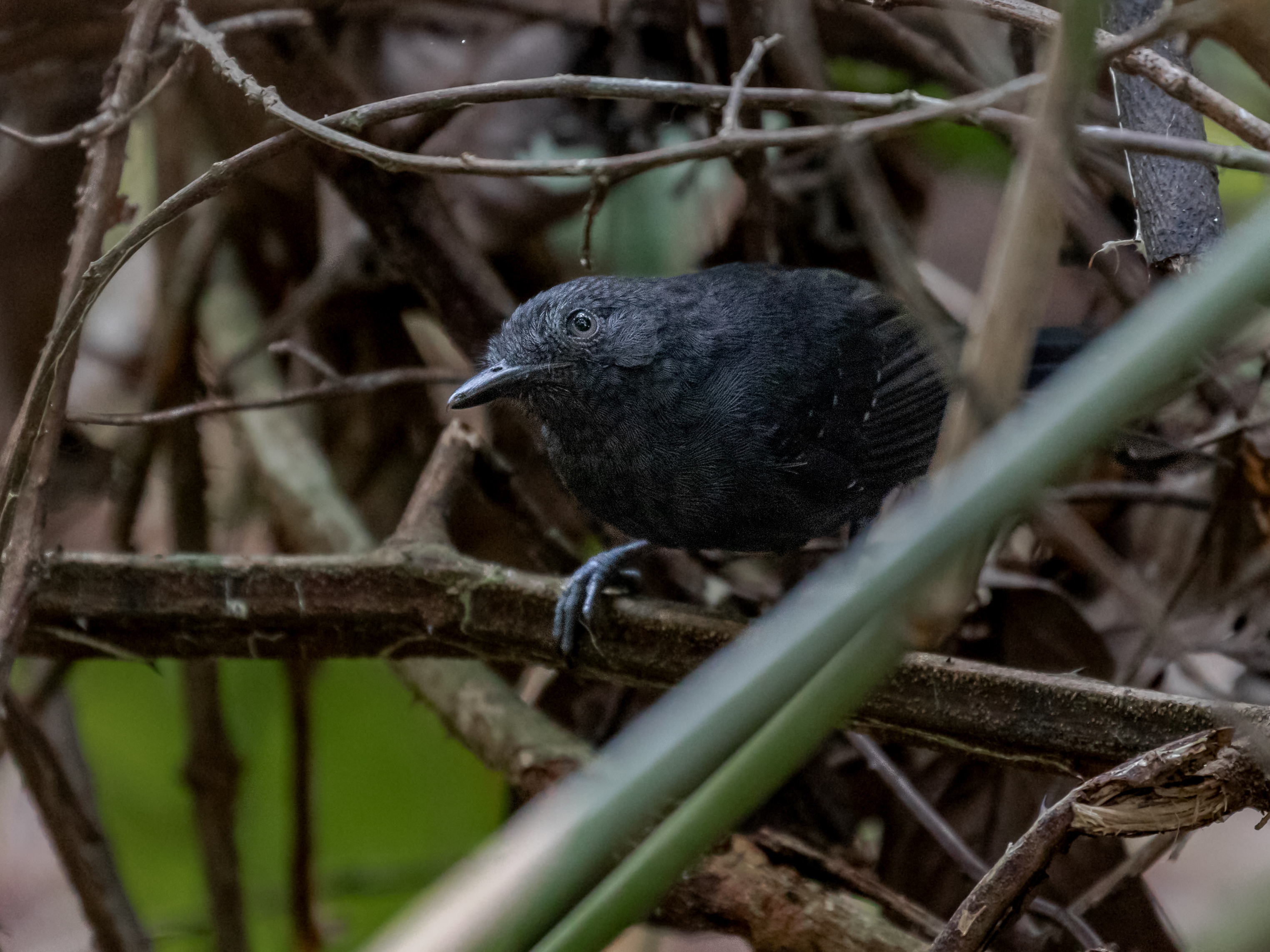
- male at Rio Branco, Acre, Brazil
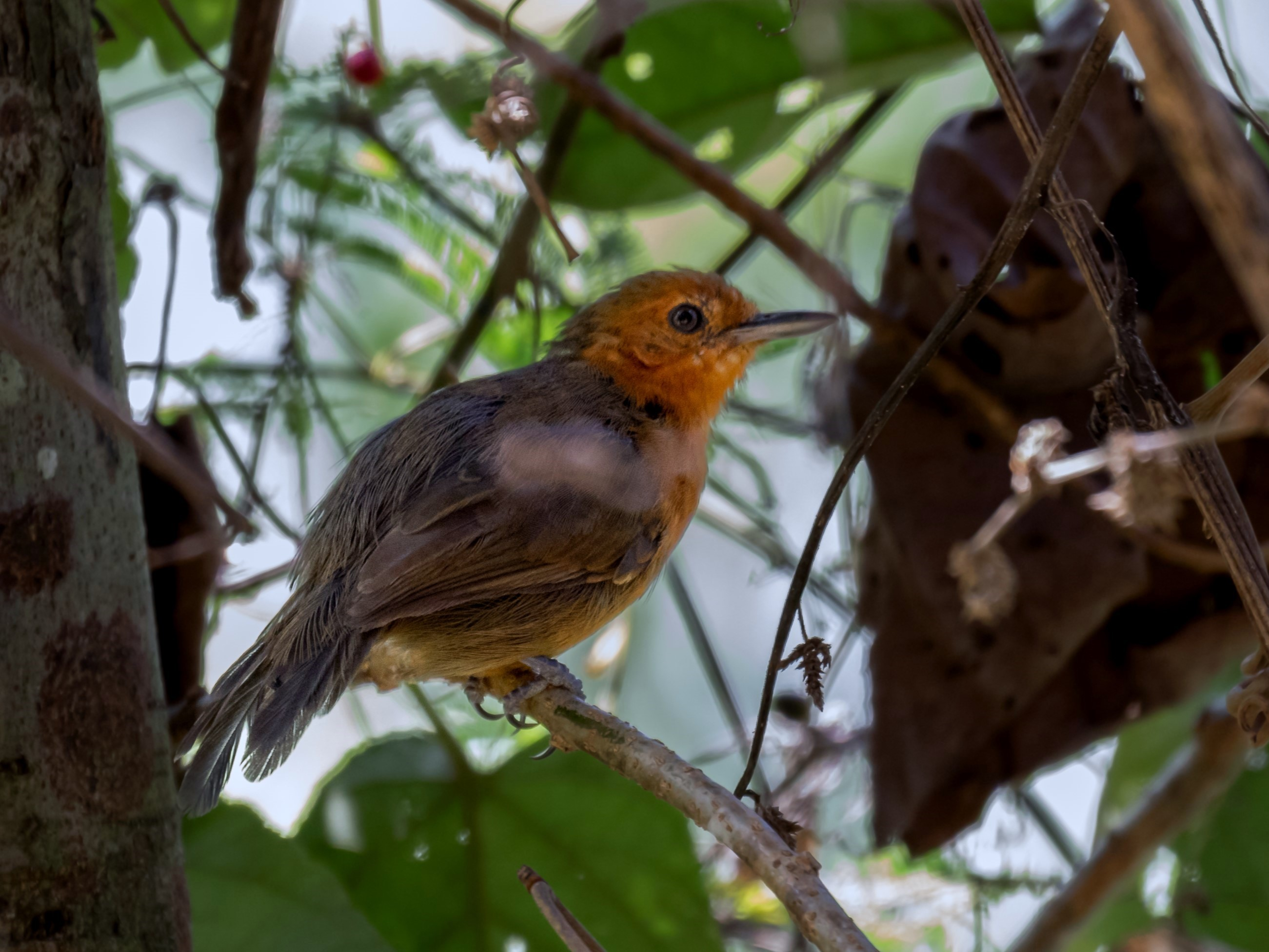
- female at same locality

Conservation status
- Least Concern (IUCN 3.1)

Scientific classification
- Kingdom: Animalia
- Phylum: Chordata
- Class: Aves
- Order: Passeriformes
- Family: Thamnophilidae
- Genus: Cercomacroides
- Species: C. fuscicauda

Binomial name
- Cercomacroides fuscicauda (Zimmer, JT, 1931)

Synonyms
- Cercomacra nigrescens fuscicauda; Cercomacra fuscicauda

= Riparian antbird =

Species of bird

The riparian antbird (Cercomacroides fuscicauda) is a species of passerine bird in subfamily Thamnophilinae of family Thamnophilidae, the "typical antbirds". It is found in Bolivia, Brazil, Colombia, Ecuador, and Peru.

== Taxonomy and systematics ==
The riparian antbird was described as a subspecies of the blackish antbird (at the time Cercomacra nigrescens, now Cercomacroides nigriscens). Significant vocal differences between it and the other five subspecies showed it to be a full species. A molecular phylogenetic study published in 2014 found that Cercomacra, as then defined, was polyphyletic. The genus was split to create two monophyletic genera, and six species including the riparian antbird were moved to the newly erected genus Cercomacroides.

The riparian antbird is monotypic.

== Description ==
The riparian antbird is 14 to 15 cm (5.5 to 5.9 in) long. Males are almost entirely dark gray, though a slightly lighter gray on their underparts. They have a mostly concealed white patch between their scapulars, a small white patch on the scapulars, and narrow white tips on their wing coverts. Females have a rufous-tinged tawny crown; their upperparts and wings are brownish olive with a small white interscapular patch. Their forehead and face are orange-tawny. Their tail is gray with an olivaceous tinge on the feather edges. Their throat and underparts are orange-rufous with a gray tinge to their flanks.

== Distribution and habitat ==
The riparian antbird is found from southern Amazonas Department in extreme southeastern Colombia south through far eastern Ecuador, eastern Peru, and southwestern Amazonian Brazil into northeastern Bolivia as far as Cochabamba Department. It almost exclusively inhabits riverside várzea forest and thickets on river islands; in southeastern Peru it also occurs in stands of bamboo. In elevation it mostly ranges between 100 and 600 m (300 and 2,000 ft), though in Ecuador it occurs below 500 m (1,600 ft) and elsewhere locally reaches 850 m (2,800 ft).

== Behavior ==
=== Movement ===
The riparian antbird is believed to be a year-round resident throughout its range.

=== Feeding ===
The riparian antbird's diet and foraging behavior have not been studied. They are probably similar to those of its former "parent" blackish antbird, which see here.

=== Breeding ===
Nothing is known about the riparian antbird's breeding biology.

=== Vocalization ===
The male riparian antbird's song is "a low-pitched introductory note followed by a rattle of descending notes, sounding like 'what cheer' ". The female's song is similar to that of female blackish antbirds (which see here) but has a higher pitch. The species' calls include a "single, slightly nasal [contact] note", a "longer series of low-pitched notes with weaker overtones than the contact calls", and in alarm "three or four notes in rapid succession".

== Status ==
The IUCN has assessed the riparian antbird as being of Least Concern. Its population size is not known and is believed to be decreasing. No immediate threats have been identified. It is considered generally fairly common though sparse in Ecuador and uncommon and local in Peru. Its range includes many large protected areas. Its "[p]reference for second-growth and edge habitats renders it less vulnerable to disturbance than are most antbirds".
