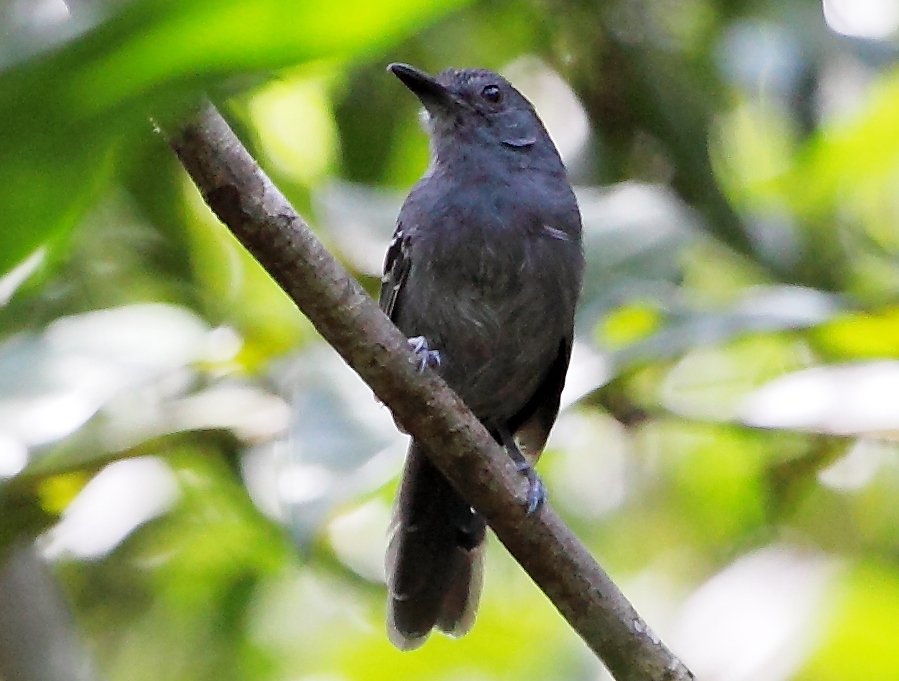

Conservation status
- Least Concern (IUCN 3.1)

Scientific classification
- Kingdom: Animalia
- Phylum: Chordata
- Class: Aves
- Order: Passeriformes
- Family: Thamnophilidae
- Genus: Cercomacroides
- Species: C. tyrannina

Binomial name
- Cercomacroides tyrannina (Sclater, PL, 1855)

Synonyms
- Cercomacra tyrannina

= Dusky antbird =

Species of bird

The dusky antbird or tyrannine antbird (Cercomacroides tyrannina) is a passerine bird in subfamily Thamnophilinae of family Thamnophilidae, the "typical antbirds". It is found from Mexico south through Central America and in Brazil, Colombia, Ecuador, French Guiana, Guyana, Suriname, and Venezuela.

== Taxonomy and systematics ==
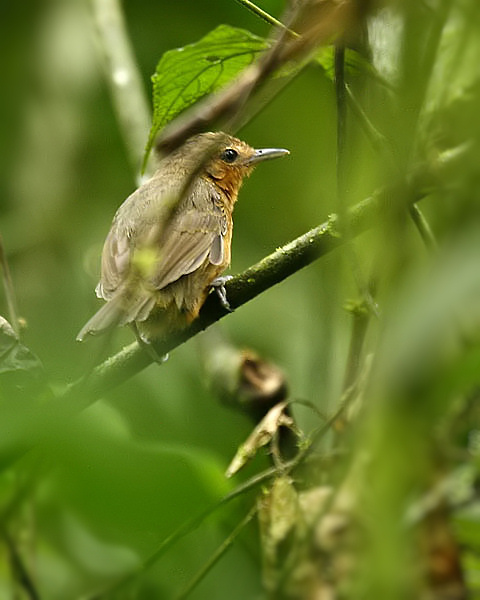
Female in NW Ecuador

The dusky antbird was described by the English zoologist Philip Sclater in 1855 and given the binomial name Pyriglena tyrannina. The species was subsequently placed in genus Cercomacra but a molecular phylogenetic study published in 2014 found that Cercomacra, as then defined, was polyphyletic. The genus was split to create two monophyletic genera, and six species including the dusky antbird were moved to the newly erected genus Cercomacroides.

The dusky antbird has these four subspecies:

- C. t. crepera (Bangs, 1901)
- C. t. tyrannina (Sclater, PL, 1855)
- C. t. vicina (Todd, 1927)
- C. t. saturatior (Chubb, C, 1918)

What is now Willis's antbird (C. laeta) was originally described as a fifth subspecies. A 1997 study found that Willis's antbird differed from the other dusky antbird subspecies in both plumage and voice and as a result, Willis's antbird was promoted to species status.

== Description ==
The dusky antbird is 13 to 15 cm (5.1 to 5.9 in) long and weighs 15 to 19 g (0.53 to 0.67 oz). Males of the nominate subspecies C. t. tyrannina are mostly slate gray; their wings and tail are darker and their underparts lighter. They have a white patch between their scapulars and narrow white tips on their wing coverts and outer tail feathers. Their posterior underparts have a clay-colored tinge. Females have a tawny-tinged dark olive-gray crown, upperparts, and wings. They have a very small white interscapular patch. Their wing coverts have cinnamon edges. Their tail is dark grayish brown. Their supercilium, throat, and underparts are tawny-buff with an olive tinge to their flanks.

Males of subspecies C. t. crepera are blacker than nominate males and have smaller white tips on their wing coverts and tail. Females have more rufescent wings than the nominate. C. t. vicina males have brownish olive wings, tail, and flanks. C. t. saturatior males are blacker than the nominate; they have white tips on the feathers of the crissum and usually white tips on some of the breast feathers. Females have grayer upperparts than the nominate.

Adults of both sexes of all subspecies have a rich chocolate-brown iris.

== Distribution and habitat ==
The subspecies of the dusky antbird are found thus:

- C. t. crepera: from Veracruz and Oaxaca in southern Mexico south through Belize, Guatemala, Nicaragua, and Costa Rica into Panama as far as northwestern Veraguas Province
- C. t. tyrannina: Panama from eastern Chiriquí Province to Colombia; in Colombia the Pacific slope, lower Cauca and Magdalena river valleys, and the Central and Eastern Andes; in western Ecuador south to Guayas Province; in southern Venezuela Bolívar and Amazonas states; and in far northwestern Brazil northern Amazonas state
- C. t. vicina: eastern and western Andes of northwestern Venezuela and the east slope of Colombia's Eastern Andes
- C. t. saturatior: from southern and eastern Bolívar in Venezuela east through the Guianas and northeastern Brazil north of the Amazon to the Atlantic in Amapá

The dusky antbird inhabits the understorey of evergreen forest, where it overwhelmingly favors the forest edges and clearings and the edges of watercourses. It also occurs in secondary forest but only that bordering taller forest and having a dense understorey. In elevation it ranges as high as 1,250 m (4,100 ft) in Central America, 2,000 m (6,600 ft) in Colombia, to 1,800 m (5,900 ft) in Venezuela though mostly below 1,200 m (3,900 ft), to 1,200 m (3,900 ft) in Brazil, and locally to 1,400 m (4,600 ft) in Ecuador though mostly below 800 m (2,600 ft).

== Behavior ==
=== Movement ===
The dusky antbird is believed to be a year-round resident throughout its range.

=== Feeding ===
The dusky antbird feeds on a wide variety of insects and spiders. Single birds, pairs, and family groups usually forage on the ground and within about 5 m (16 ft) of it. It typically hops through dense vegetation, taking prey from vegetation by gleaning, reaching, lunging, and making short fluttery flights from a perch. It rarely, and only briefly, joins mixed-species feeding flocks. In Panama it regularly attends army ant swarms, usually for a fairly short time.

=== Breeding ===
The dusky antbird's breeding season varies geographically, for instance it spans February to October in Costa Rica and Panama and August to November in Amazonian Brazil. Its nest is a roundish to elongated pouch made a variety of plant materials including dead leaves, strips of palm frond, grasses, fungal rhizomorphs, and fern stems. It typically hangs from a slender branch or vine within about 3 m (10 ft) of the ground. The usual clutch is two eggs; the eggs vary somewhat among the subspecies but are generally white or pink with reddish, violet, or brown markings. Both parents incubate during the day and the female alone at night. Both parents brood and provision nestlings. The incubation period is 14 to 20 days and fledging occurs between 9 and 11 days after hatch.

=== Vocalization ===
The dusky antbird's song varies somewhat among the subspecies. The male's is generally "a series of relatively short notes at even pitch and pace except for lower-pitched initial and terminal notes". Female's song is typically "a series of long notes rising in pitch followed by series of abrupt notes typically remaining at same pitch". Their calls include "1–6 soft abrupt 'chip' notes that usually shift in pitch in multiple-note calls, and [a] short rattle or 'chirr' ". The nominate subspecies' male song has been rendered as "pü, pü, pee-pee-pipipi?" and the nominate female's as "juut-ut'juut-ut'juut-ut'juut-ut".

== Status ==
The IUCN has assessed the dusky antbird as being of Least Concern. It has an extremely large range and an estimated population of at least 500,000 mature individuals; its population is believed to be decreasing. No immediate threats have been identified. It is considered fairly common to common throughout its range, which includes many large protected areas. "Its ability to occupy second-growth thickets and forest edge renders this species less vulnerable to disturbance than are most antbirds."
