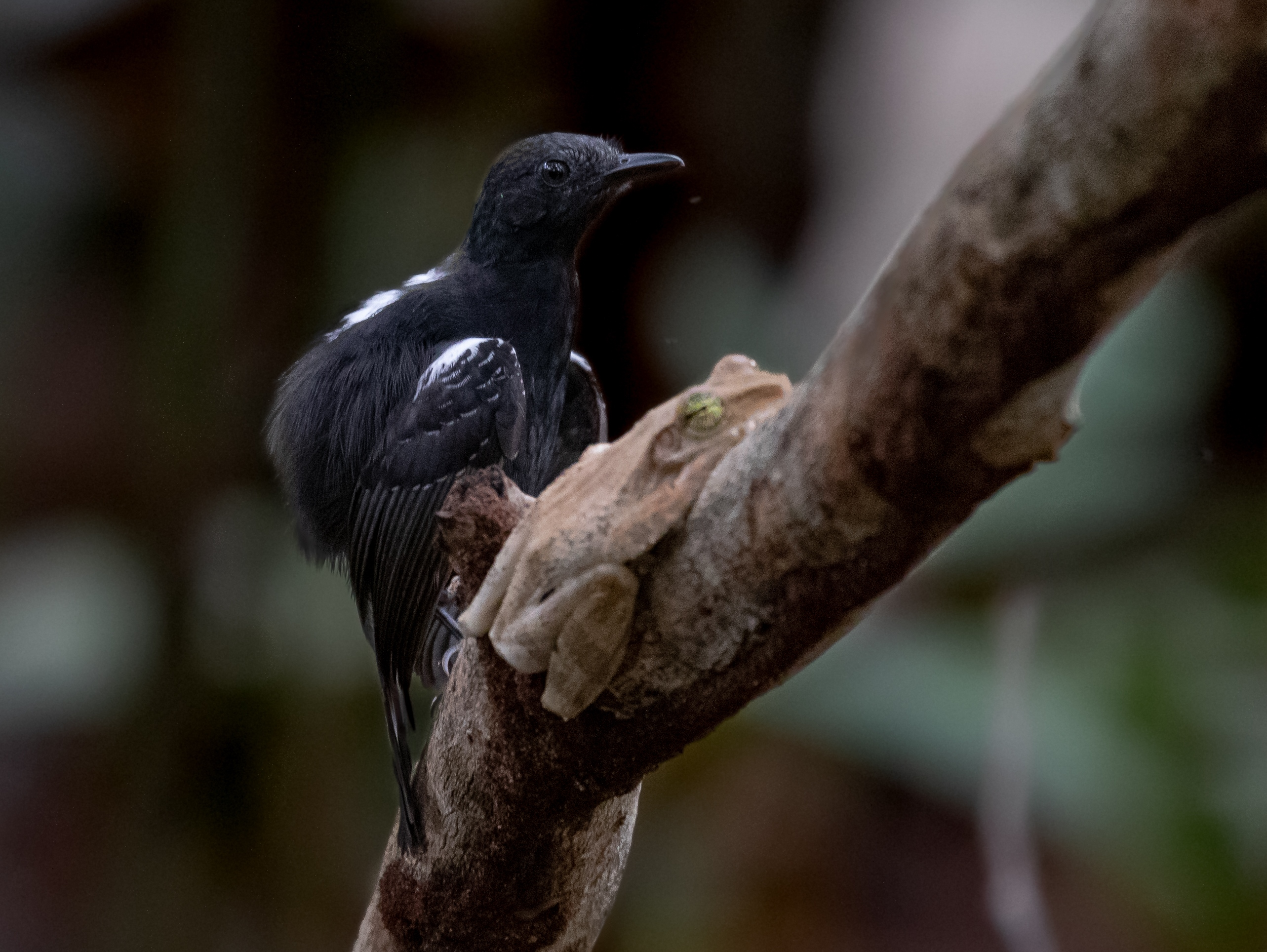
- Male
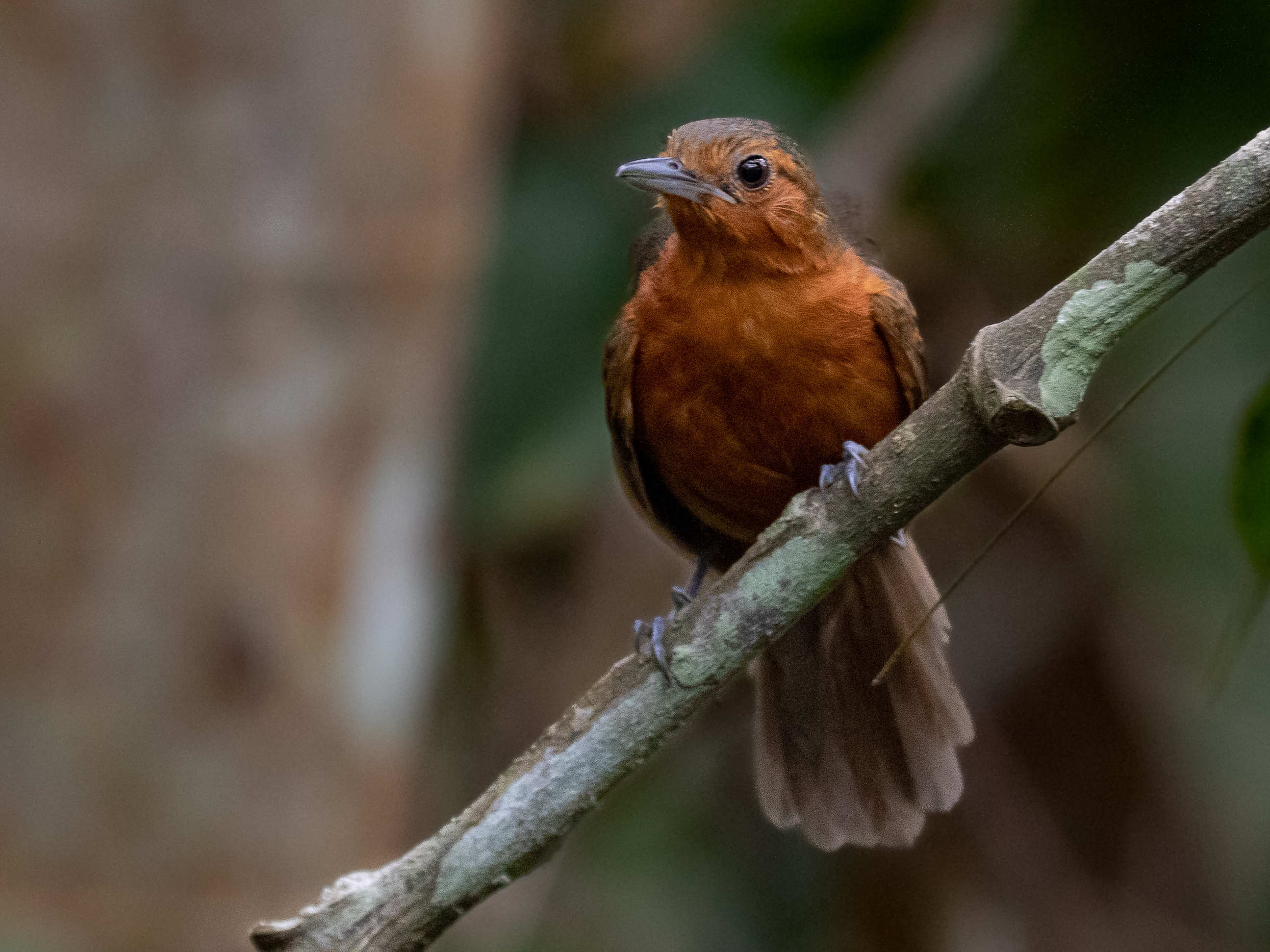
- Female

Conservation status
- Least Concern (IUCN 3.1)

Scientific classification
- Kingdom: Animalia
- Phylum: Chordata
- Class: Aves
- Order: Passeriformes
- Family: Thamnophilidae
- Genus: Cercomacroides
- Species: C. serva

Binomial name
- Cercomacroides serva (Sclater, PL, 1858)

Synonyms
- Cercomacra serva

= Black antbird =

Species of bird

The black antbird (Cercomacroides serva) is a species of passerine bird in subfamily Thamnophilinae of family Thamnophilidae, the "typical antbirds". It is found in Bolivia, Brazil, Colombia, Ecuador, and Peru.

== Taxonomy and systematics ==
The black antbird was described by the English zoologist Philip Sclater in 1858 and given the binomial name Pyriglena serva. It was later included in genus Cercomacra but when a molecular phylogenetic study published in 2014 found that Cercomacra was polyphyletic, the genus was split to create two monophyletic genera, and six species including the black antbird were moved to the newly erected genus Cercomacroides.

The black antbird is monotypic.

== Description ==
The black antbird is 13.5 to 15 cm (5.3 to 5.9 in) long and weighs 15 to 17 g (0.53 to 0.60 oz). Males are almost entirely blackish to dark gray. They have a white patch between their scapulars, a small hidden white patch under the scapulars, gray edges on their flight feathers, and white tips on their wing coverts. Females have an olive-tinged dark gray crown, upperparts, wings, and tail with a small white interscapular patch. Their wing coverts and the edges of their flight feathers have a yellowish brown tinge. Their underparts are reddish brown to reddish yellow-brown. Both sexes are darker in the northern part of the species' range than the southern part.

== Distribution and habitat ==
The black antbird is a bird of the western Amazon Basin and adjoining Andean foothills. It is found from Putumayo Department in southern Colombia south through eastern Ecuador and eastern Peru into northwestern Bolivia's Pando and La Paz departments and east into Brazil to the rios Juruá, Purus, and Madeira. There are also scattered records further east. It inhabits the understorey of terra firme and várzea evergreen forest, the transitional forest between them, and nearby mature secondary forest. In all forest types it favors the edges, densely vegetated openings such as those caused by fallen trees, the margins of lakes, and (within the forest) stands of bamboo. In elevation it reaches 500 m (1,600 ft) in Colombia, 1,300 m (4,300 ft) in Ecuador, and locally 1,500 m (4,900 ft) but usually only 1,100 m (3,600 ft) in Peru.

== Behavior ==
=== Movement ===
The black antbird is believed to be a year-round resident throughout its range.

=== Feeding ===
The black antbird feeds on a wide variety of insects and probably also spiders. Single birds, pairs, and family groups usually forage within about 2 m (7 ft) of the ground and very rarely as high as 7 m (23 ft). It typically hops through dense vegetation, taking prey from vegetation by gleaning, reaching, lunging, and making short fluttery flights from a perch. It seldom joins mixed-species feeding flocks. In Ecuador it has been observed attending army ant swarms.

=== Breeding ===
The black antbird's breeding season is not fully defined but in Peru includes at least September to December. Its nest is a cup made a variety of plant materials including dead leaves, plant fibers, and moss. It typically hangs from a slender branch or vine low to the ground. The usual clutch is two eggs; they are white or creamy with red or violet markings. The incubation period is not known. Fledging occurs 12 to 14 days after hatch and both parents provision the nestlings. Other details of parental care are not known.

=== Vocalization ===
The male black antbird sings "a series of 4–7 countable...sharp notes rising in pitch and accelerating slightly" that has been written as "wor, chur, cheh-cheh-che-che-chi-chi-chi?". Females reply with a song that is "similar but lower-pitched and often followed by 2–4 soft abrupt notes". The species' calls include "a short to moderately long (e.g. 2 seconds) series of harsh 'chak' notes delivered rapidly, and similar notes given in pairs".

== Status ==
The IUCN has assessed the black antbird as being of Least Concern. It has a large range; its population size is not known and is believed to be stable. No immediate threats have been identified. It is considered uncommon throughout its range. Its range includes several large protected areas and "also large expanses of intact, suitable habitat that are not formally protected, but seem to be at little risk of being developed in near future". "This species' ability to utilize a variety of second-growth habitats renders it less vulnerable to disturbance than are many other antbirds."
