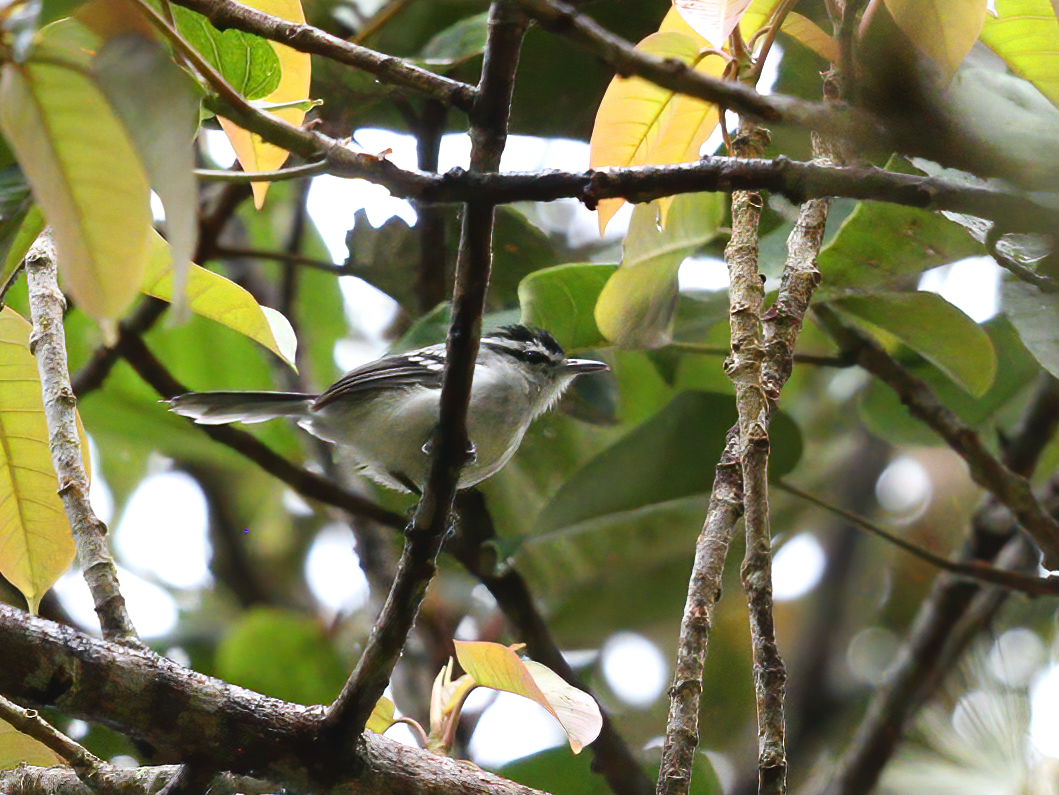

Conservation status
- Least Concern (IUCN 3.1)

Scientific classification
- Kingdom: Animalia
- Phylum: Chordata
- Class: Aves
- Order: Passeriformes
- Family: Thamnophilidae
- Genus: Herpsilochmus
- Species: H. motacilloides

Binomial name
- Herpsilochmus motacilloides Taczanowski, 1874

= Creamy-bellied antwren =

Species of bird

The creamy-bellied antwren (Herpsilochmus motacilloides) is a species of bird in subfamily Thamnophilinae of family Thamnophilidae, the "typical antbirds". It is endemic to Peru.

== Taxonomy and systematics ==
For much of the twentieth century the creamy-bellied antwren was treated as a subspecies of the Bahia antwren (Herpsilochmus pileatus), though at least one study suggested that it was a species. In the early twenty-first century, phylogenetic and other analyses confirmed that it is a species. The creamy-bellied antwren and the ash-throated antwren (H. parkeri) are sister species.

The creamy-bellied antwren is monotypic.

== Description ==
The creamy-bellied antwren is about 12 cm (4.7 in) long and weighs about 10.5 to 13 g (0.37 to 0.46 oz). Adult males have a black crown and nape, a white supercilium, a thin black streak through the eye, and white ear coverts. Their back and rump are gray or olive gray with white-tipped blackish scapulars and a small hidden white patch between them. Their wings are black with white tips on the coverts and white edges on the flight feathers. Their central tail feathers are black with small white tips; the rest are black with white tips that are progressively larger to the entirely white outermost pair. Their throat is white or pale yellow buff and their breast and belly pale yellow with a light gray wash on the sides of the breast and flanks. Adult females have a rusty brown forehead and a black streak behind the eye. Their crown and nape are black with white streaks. Their back and rump are olive gray with white-edged blackish scapulars. Their wings are black with white tips on the coverts and pale olive brown or whitish brown edges. Their tail is like the male's. Their throat is white and the rest of their underparts are like the male's. Adults have a brown iris, a black maxilla, a grayish blue mandible, and blue-gray or grayish blue legs and feet.

== Distribution and habitat ==
The creamy-bellied antwren is found on the east side of the Peruvian Andes between the departments of Huánuco and Cuzco. It inhabits it interior and edges of humid montane forest where it favors areas with tall trees and much moss and epiphytes. In elevation it ranges between 900 and 2,100 m (3,000 and 6,900 ft).

== Behavior ==
=== Movement ===
The creamy-bellied antwren is a year-round resident throughout its range.

=== Feeding ===
The creamy-bellied antwren's diet has not been detailed but is known to include insects. It usually forages in pairs and often as a member of a mixed-species feeding flock. It mostly forages in the outer branches of trees, gleaning prey from leaves.

=== Breeding ===
The creamy-bellied antwren is believed to be monogamous, but nothing else is known about its breeding biology.

=== Vocalization ===
The creamy-bellied antwren's song is "a rapid, accelerating series of rich notes, which rises slightly and then falls [with] two or three distinct introductory notes...chew-PEE-PEE kree'e'E'E'e'e'e'e'e'rr".

== Status ==
The IUCN originally in 2004 assessed the creamy-bellied antwren as being of Least Concern, then in 2012 as Near Threatened, and in 2023 again as of Least Concern. It has a large range and an unknown population size that is believed to be decreasing. "The primary threat to this species is accelerating deforestation in its range as forests are logged for conversion into pastures and agriculture cultivation." It is considered uncommon to locally fairly common. "With its relatively small geographic range, and restricted elevational range, Creamy-bellied Antwren is vulnerable to habitat loss or degradation."
