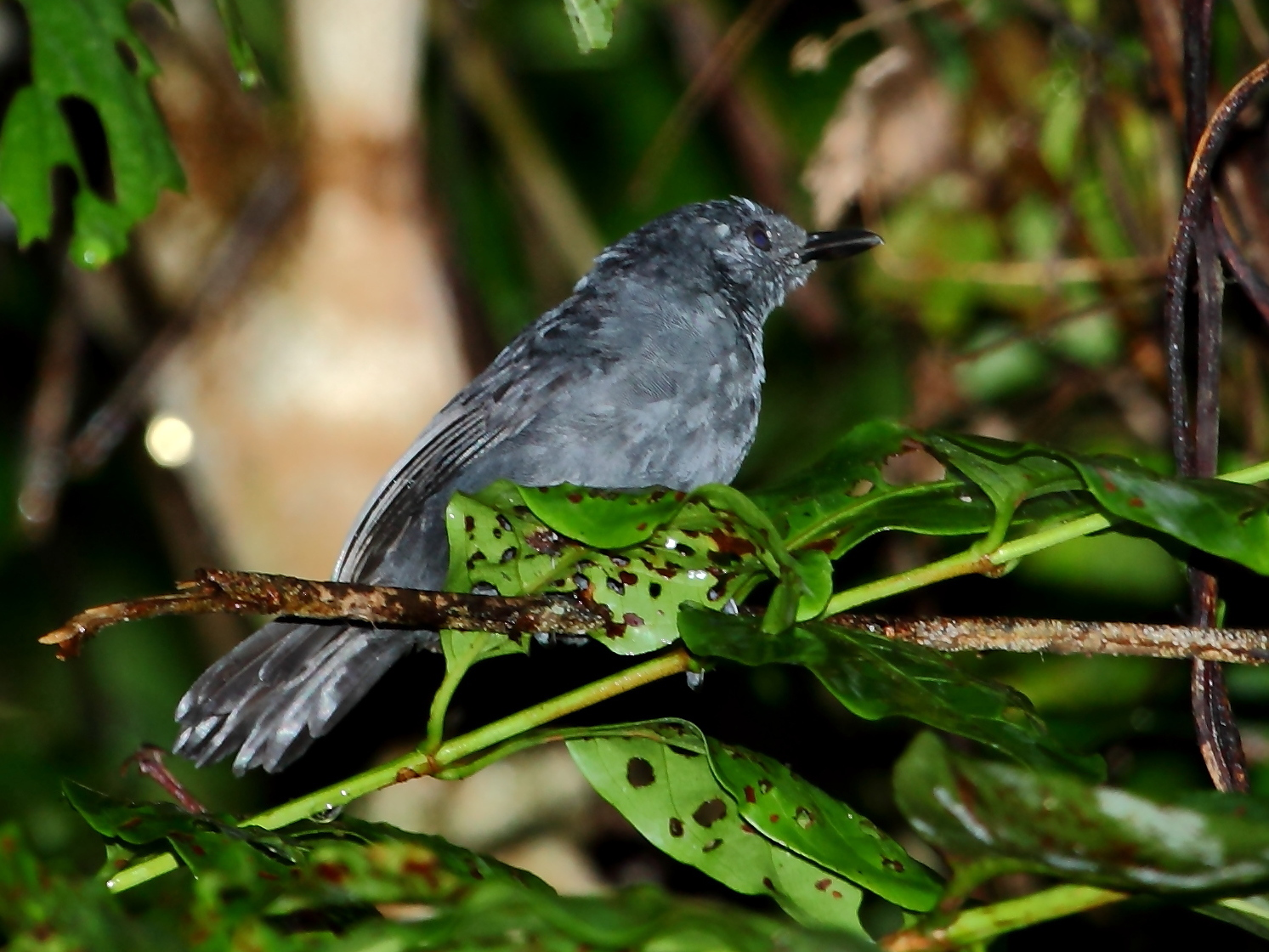
- male at Apiacás, Mato Grosso state, Brazil

Conservation status
- Least Concern (IUCN 3.1)

Scientific classification
- Kingdom: Animalia
- Phylum: Chordata
- Class: Aves
- Order: Passeriformes
- Family: Thamnophilidae
- Genus: Cercomacroides
- Species: C. nigrescens

Binomial name
- Cercomacroides nigrescens (Cabanis & Heine, 1860)

Synonyms
- Cercomacra nigrescens

= Blackish antbird =

Species of bird

The blackish antbird (Cercomacroides nigrescens) is a species of passerine bird in subfamily Thamnophilinae of family Thamnophilidae, the "typical antbirds". It is found in Bolivia, Brazil, Colombia, Ecuador, French Guiana, Guyana, Peru, and Suriname.

== Taxonomy and systematics ==
The blackish antbird was described by the German ornithologists Jean Cabanis and Ferdinand Heine in 1860 and given the binomial name Percnostola nigrescens. The specific epithet is from the Latin nigrescens "blackish" (from nigrescere "to become black"). The antbird was subsequently included in the genus Cercomacra but a molecular phylogenetic study published in 2014 found that Cercomacra was polyphyletic. The genus was split to create two monophyletic genera, and six species including the blackish antbird were moved to the newly erected genus Cercomacroides.

The blackish antbird has these five subspecies:

- C. n. nigrescens (Cabanis & Heine, 1860)
- C. n. aequatorialis (Zimmer, JT, 1931)
- C. n. notata (Zimmer, JT, 1931)
- C. n. approximans (Pelzeln, 1868)
- C. n. ochrogyna (Snethlage, E, 1928)

What is now the riparian antbird (C. fuscicauda) was previously treated as a sixth subspecies of the blackish antbird but significant vocal differences between it and the other five showed it to be a full species.

== Description ==
The blackish antbird is 14 to 15 cm (5.5 to 5.9 in) long and weighs 14 to 25 g (0.49 to 0.88 oz). Males of the nominate subspecies C. n. nigrescens are almost entirely blackish gray. They have a white patch between their scapulars, a hidden white patch under the scapulars, and narrow white tips on their wing coverts. Females have rufous-tinged olive-gray crown, upperparts, and wings with a white interscapular patch. Their forehead and face are orange-rufous. Their tail is blackish. Their throat and underparts are orange-rufous with an olive tinge to their flanks.

Males of subspecies C. n. notata are paler than the nominate. Females have more olivaceous upperparts than the nominate, and their tail is light brownish. Males of C. n. aequatorialis are similar to notata males but with wider white tips on their wing coverts. Females have more rufescent upperparts than notata females. C. n. approximans males are paler than nominate males and have wider white tips on the wing coverts. Females are browner than nominate females and have cinnamon tips on the wing coverts. C. n. ochrogyna males are essentially the same as approximans males. Females are paler and more ochraceous than approximans females.

== Distribution and habitat ==
The blackish antbird has a disjunct distribution. Subspecies C. n. nigrescens is separate from the others. C. n. aequatorialis and C. n. notata are contiguous or nearly so and apart from the others. C. n. approximans and C. n. ochrogyna are apart from the others and separated from each other only by rivers. The subspecies are found thus:

- C. n. nigrescens: coastal Guyana, Suriname, and French Guiana, and Amazonas and Pará north of the Amazon in far northeastern Brazil
- C. n. aequatorialis: eastern slope of the Andes from Nariño Department in southern Colombia south through Ecuador into northeastern Peru to the Department of San Martín
- C. n. notata: eastern slope of the Andes of central Peru from western Ucayali south into northwestern Cuzco departments
- C. n. approximans: central Brazil south of the Amazon between the rios Madeira and Tapajós and south to Rondônia and Mato Grosso states west of the Rio Teles Pires and into eastern Bolivia's eastern Beni and northern Santa Cruz departments
- C. n. ochrogyna: east-central Brazil south of the Amazon between the rios Tapajos and Tocantins and south into Mato Grosso east of the Teles Pires

The blackish antbird inhabits a variety of densely vegetated but somewhat open landscapes. These include the edges of terra firme, várzea, and transitional evergreen forest and gaps within them. They also include secondary forest adjacent to primary forest, river islands with mid-succession growth, bamboo stands, vine tangles, and clearings and plantations being reclaimed by forest. Lowland populations tend to favor wetter habitats and those in the Andes drier ones. The species reaches 900 m (3,000 ft) in Brazil and 1,500 m (4,900 ft) in Colombia. In Ecuador it occurs between 1,000 and 1,800 m (3,300 and 5,900 ft) and in Peru between 700 and 2,100 m (2,300 and 6,900 ft).

== Behavior ==
=== Movement ===
The blackish antbird is believed to be a year-round resident throughout its range.

=== Feeding ===
The blackish antbird's diet has not been detailed but is known to include a variety of insects and probably also spiders. Single birds, pairs, and family groups usually forage on the ground or within about 5 m (16 ft) of it though occasionally higher. It typically hops through dense vegetation, taking prey from vegetation by gleaning, reaching, lunging, and making short fluttery flights from a perch. It seldom joins mixed-species feeding flocks; it only rarely attends army ant swarms and spends little time with them.

=== Breeding ===
Nothing is known about the blackish antbird's breeding biology.

=== Vocalization ===
Male blackish antbirds of the nominate subspecies sing "a single low 'wup' followed by short rattle of variable length...that usually becomes less intense". Songs of males of the other subspecies differ somewhat in the rattle's pitch and the song's pace. Females of all subspecies sing "a series of countable 'wup' notes...rising up the scale" with slight variations among them; they often start singing during the male's song. One authority writes the songs as "twa CHEE-EE-ee-ee-eer" and "tew TEW TEW TEW" respectively. The species' call is "a harsh, unmusical 'chirr', variable in length, usually flat but sometimes downslurred".

== Status ==
The IUCN has assessed the blackish antbird as being of Least Concern. It has a very large range; its population size is not known and is believed to be decreasing. No immediate threats have been identified. It is considered fairly common in most of its range but uncommon in Colombia. Its range includes many large protected areas. The "[p]reference of all races for second-growth and edge habitats renders them less vulnerable to disturbance than are most antbirds".
