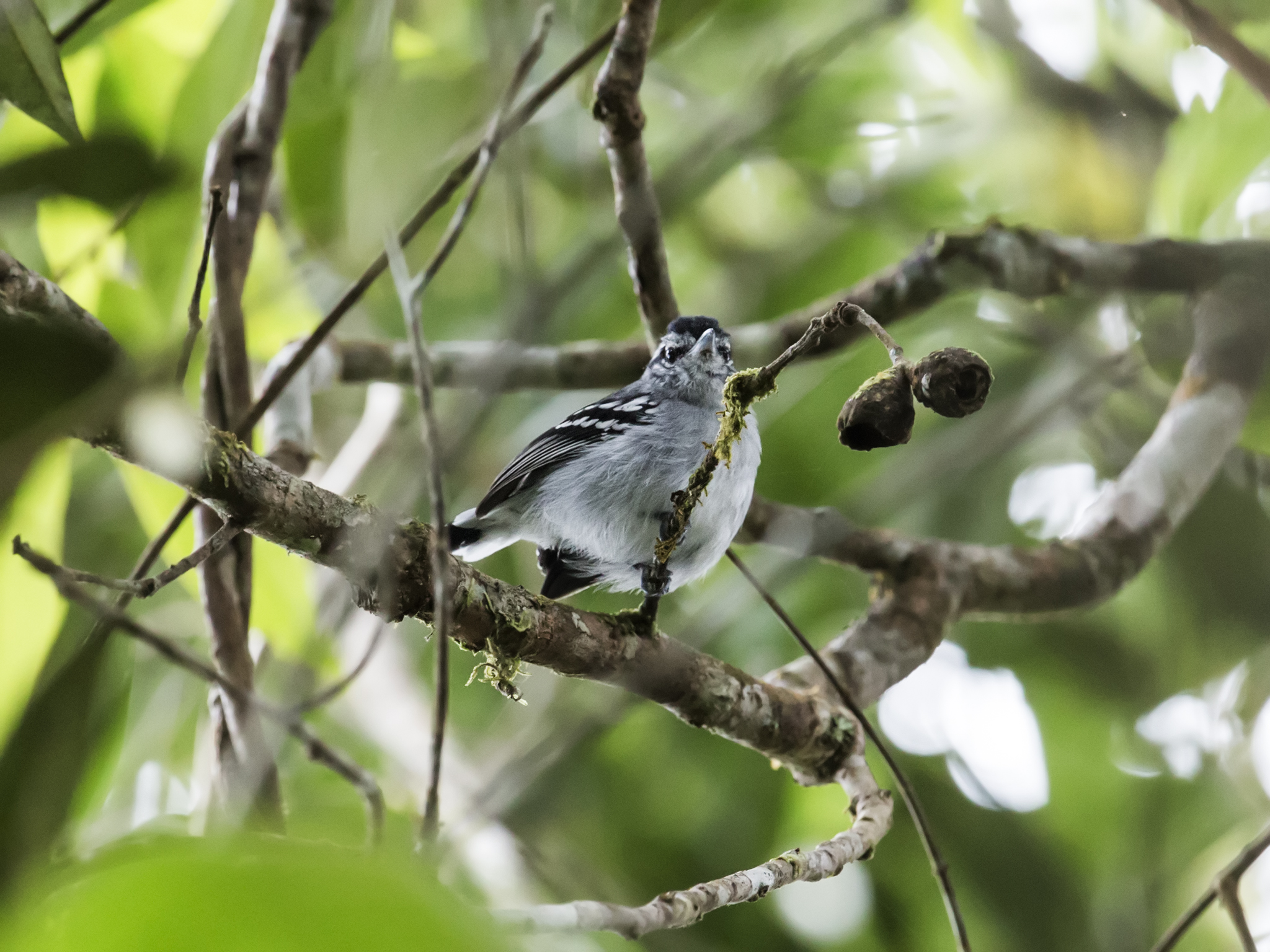

Conservation status
- Vulnerable (IUCN 3.1)

Scientific classification
- Kingdom: Animalia
- Phylum: Chordata
- Class: Aves
- Order: Passeriformes
- Family: Thamnophilidae
- Genus: Herpsilochmus
- Species: H. parkeri

Binomial name
- Herpsilochmus parkeri Davis & O'Neill, 1986

= Ash-throated antwren =

Species of bird

The ash-throated antwren (Herpsilochmus parkeri) is a Vulnerable species of bird in subfamily Thamnophilinae of family Thamnophilidae, the "typical antbirds". It is endemic to Peru.

== Taxonomy and systematics ==
The ash-throated antwren was described as a new species in 1986. The first specimens had been collected in northern Peru in 1983. It is a member of a clade within the genus that also includes the Bahia antwren (H. pileatus), black-capped antwren (H. atricapillus), and creamy-bellied antwren (H. motacilloides). The ash-throated and creamy-bellied antwrens are sister species. The ash-throated antwren's specific epithet honors Theodore A. Parker III, "the finest field birder/ornithologist that the world had ever seen".

The ash-throated antwren is monotypic.

== Description ==
The ash-throated antwren is 11.5 to 13 cm (4.5 to 5.1 in) long; the holotype weighed 11.5 g (0.41 oz). Adult males have a black crown, a pale grayish white supercilium, a black streak through the eye, and pale grayish white ear coverts. Their back and rump are gray with dark gray to black scapulars that have wide white outer webs. They have a mixed black and white patch between the scapulars. Their wings are black with wide white tips on the coverts and brownish tips and white outer edges on the flight feathers. Their central tail feathers are black with white tips; the rest are black with white tips that are progressively larger to the outermost pair, whose outer half is white. Their chin is pale grayish white, their throat and breast pale gray, the center of their belly white, and their undertail coverts grayish white. The sides of their breast and flanks are a darker gray than the breast itself. Adult females have an orangish cinnamon forehead, a dark buff supercilium, and a black streak behind the eye. Their crown is dusky to black with a few thin white streaks. The sides of their neck are ochraceous buff, making a "collar" except for the black nape. Their back and rump are gray with a light ochraceous wash on the upper back and black, white, and gray scapulars. Their wings and tail are like the male's. Their chin, throat, and breast are ochraceous buff, their belly white, and their flanks and undertail coverts pale gray with a light buffy wash. Adults have a brown iris, a black maxilla, a grayish blue mandible, and blue-gray or grayish blue legs and feet.

== Distribution and habitat ==
The ash-throated antwren is known only from the watershed of the Río Mayo in the northern Peruvian Department of San Martín. It inhabits a variety of wooded landscapes including tall humid montane forest, mid-height semi-stunted forest, and very low stunted forest, many of them on sandy soil. In elevation it occurs in the narrow range of 1,250 to 1,450 m (4,100 to 4,800 ft).

== Behavior ==
=== Movement ===
The ash-throated antwren is a year-round resident throughout its range.

=== Feeding ===
The ash-throated antwren's diet has not been detailed but is known to include insects and spiders. It usually forages in pairs and often as a member of a mixed-species feeding flock.

=== Breeding ===
The ash-throated antwren's breeding season appears to span from May to September or October. Nothing else is known about the species' breeding biology.

=== Vocalization ===
The ash-throated antwren's song is "a rapid, accelerating-decelerating, rising-falling series of rich notes, with a rising series of 2 or 3 introductory notes: pew-PEW-PEW-pee'e'E'E'E'e'e-e-e-e-u". Its call is "a rich, short tchew, often doubled or tripled".

== Status ==
The IUCN originally in 1988 assessed the ash-throated antwren as Threatened, then in 1994 as Vulnerable, in 2000 as Endangered, and in 2021 again as Vulnerable. It has a very small range and its estimated population of 1720 to 4800 mature individuals is believed to be decreasing. "Its small known range is coupled with widespread deforestation of the adjacent lowlands in the río Mayo valley. Coca and coffee are widely cultivated in this region, and areas of suitable habitat are gradually being cleared for timber, agriculture, road developments and human population growth."
