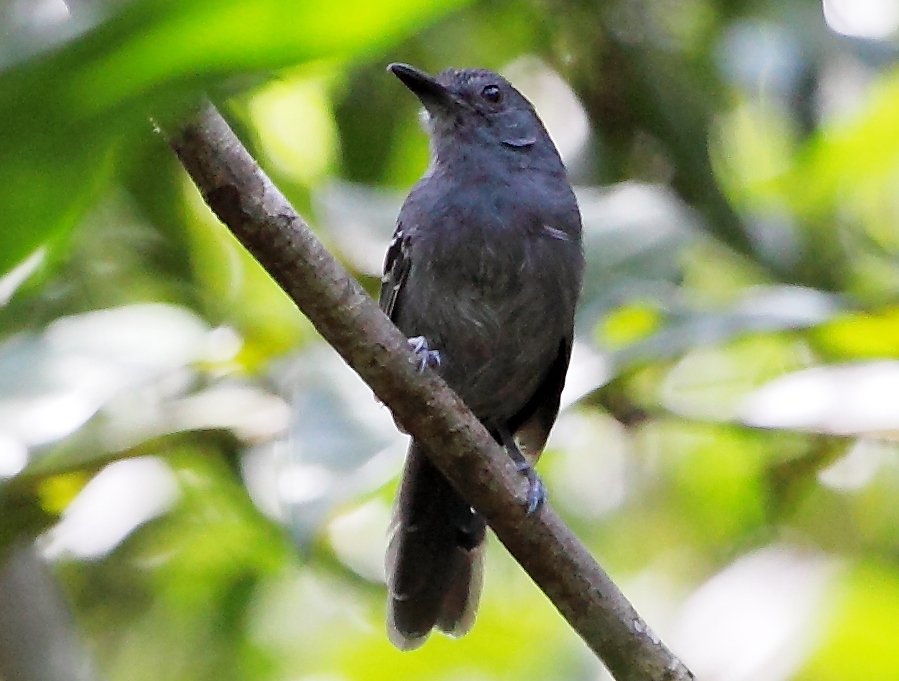
- Dusky antbird (Cercomacroides tyrannina)

Scientific classification
- Kingdom: Animalia
- Phylum: Chordata
- Class: Aves
- Order: Passeriformes
- Family: Thamnophilidae
- Genus: Cercomacroides; Tello et al., 2014

= Cercomacroides =

Genus of birds

Cercomacroides is a genus of antbirds in the family Thamnophilidae. These birds live in tropical areas from southern Central America to northern South America. There are six known species in this genus. They mostly live in the Amazon rainforest and on the east side of the Andes Mountains.These birds used to be part of the genus Cercomacra, but scientists made a new genus in 2014 after studying their DNA.The genus Cercomacroides includes six confirmed species. All species are classified as “Least Concern” (LC) by the International Union for Conservation of Nature (IUCN).

These birds are small. Males are black or dark grey. Females are orange-brown or olive. There is clear sexual dimorphism. They live in tropical rainforests and feed on insects. Some species follow army ants to catch prey. Their songs are duets between mates, but not sung at the same time. This is a key trait of the genus. Their nests hang between vines or shrubs. Both parents build the nest, sit on the eggs, and feed the chicks.

== Morphological characteristics ==
Cercomacroides are small to medium-sized antbirds. Their body length is about 12 to 14 cm, and they weigh between 15 and 25 grams. Their bills are black or dark grey. The upper bill is slightly curved, and the lower bill is straight. They have short wings and cannot fly far. They usually move by hopping or short flights. Their tails are long and slightly wedge-shaped. Their wings are short and round, which helps them move quickly through thick plants. Their legs are strong and dark grey or lead-colored. This helps them climb and jump on the ground or between branches.

Male birds are mostly black or dark grey. Their plumage is even, with no clear markings. Their tail feathers are one dark color without white tips. This is a key difference from the Cercomacra genus. Female birds have warmer colors, such as orange-brown, yellow-brown, or olive. The color difference between males and females is clear. Sexual dimorphism is common in this genus. The feathers on the face are dense and provide protection. Young birds have lighter plumage, usually brownish-yellow or olive, with pale edges on the feathers. It is hard to tell male and female chicks apart in the early stages.

=== Differences between species ===
This table compares six species within the genus Cercomacroides, outlining key differences in male and female plumage and distinctive features used for identification.

Species Name	Male Features	Female Features	Identification Highlights
Willis’s Antbird C. laeta	All black, throat slightly orange, tail feathers black	Brownish-orange, wing and ear feathers orange, body slender	Female has shorter tail, head is slightly brighter
Blackish Antbird C. nigrescens	Dark grey, white edges on wing feathers, clear shoulder mark	Dark brown, underparts orange-brown	High variation by region, males have darkest plumage
Dusky Antbird C. tyrannina	Slate grey, lighter throat, iris brown	Brown to yellow-brown, warm tone on lower body	Obvious regional differences, medium-dark overall colour
Parker’s Antbird C. parkeri	Slate grey, slightly brown, longer tail	Grey-brown with yellow-brown, shoulder mark reduced or missing	Longest tail, smaller body size
Black Antbird C. serva	Black to dark grey, white edges on wing tips	Greyish brown, red or yellow tint on underparts	Southern birds are darker, white wing edge very clear
Riparian Antbird C. fuscicauda	Dark grey with bluish shine, small white spot on shoulder	Brownish orange, lighter back, tail edges orange-brown	White tail edges, cleanest and simplest plumage among species

== Distribution ==
Species of the genus Cercomacroides are found from southern Central America to northern South America. They are mainly distributed in the Amazon Basin and on the eastern slopes of the Andes Mountains. Their range includes southern Mexico, Costa Rica, Panama, Colombia, Venezuela, Ecuador, Peru, and northern Brazil. While some species share overlapping areas, most have specific regional centers.

== Recognized Species ==
The genus Cercomacroides now includes the following 6 confirmed species:

Image	English Name	Scientific Name	Distribution Area
	Willis’s Antbird	Cercomacroides laeta	Central Amazon in Brazil, northeast of Pará State
	Parker’s Antbird	Cercomacroides parkeri	Central-west Colombia, Andes Mountains (around 1100–1950 m elevation)
	Blackish Antbird	Cercomacroides nigrescens	Tropical forests in northern South America
	Riparian Antbird	Cercomacroides fuscicauda	Eastern to southeastern Colombia, northwestern Brazil and Peru
	Dusky Antbird	Cercomacroides tyrannina	From southeast Mexico, through Central America, to northwest Ecuador and many parts of the Amazon
	Black Antbird	Cercomacroides serva	From southeastern Colombia to northern Bolivia and northern Brazil

== Conservation status ==
According to the IUCN Red List, all six species of Cercomacroides are currently classified as “Least Concern” in terms of global conservation status. They are mostly found in tropical rainforests and secondary forests in South America. Some species can live well in disturbed habitats such as forest edges, secondary growth, and bamboo areas. This makes them less sensitive to human activities compared to other forest birds.

However, there are still clear differences in range and population status among the species. The Black Antbird, Dusky Antbird, and Riparian Antbird have wide distributions and stable populations. They are found in several national parks and are considered common or fairly common.

In contrast, Parker’s Antbird and the Blackish Antbird have smaller ranges. They mostly live in specific elevation zones in the Andes Mountains. Their population sizes are limited, and they face some risk from habitat loss.

Overall, this genus shows good adaptability to secondary forests, which gives it more resilience than many other understorey birds.

== Taxonomic history ==
Cercomacroides was originally part of the genus Cercomacra. For many years, Cercomacra was seen as a uniform and monophyletic genus based on its physical traits. However, as scientists studied the behavior and vocal patterns of antbirds more closely, they began to question whether Cercomacra was truly as unified as it appeared.

In the early 1990s, scientists divided the genus Cercomacra into two informal groups. They used female plumage and song behavior to make this division. The two groups were called the “nigricans group” and the “tyrannina group.” However, this division had no strong phylogenetic evidence. So, it was not widely accepted.

In 2014, Tello and colleagues published a study in the Zoological Journal of the Linnean Society. They used mitochondrial and nuclear genes (ND2, ND3, CYTB, and FIB5) to analyze relationships. They built a phylogenetic tree using maximum likelihood and Bayesian methods. Their results showed that Cercomacra was polyphyletic. It included two unrelated lineages.

One of these lineages, led by Cercomacra tyrannina, was moved to a new genus: Cercomacroides. The South American Classification Committee (SACC) approved this change under Proposal No. 638.

The name Cercomacroides comes from three Greek roots: cerco- meaning “tail,” -macr- meaning “long,” and -oides meaning “similar to.” The full name means “a group similar in appearance to Cercomacra,” highlighting its visual similarity while recognizing its separate evolutionary lineage.

The new genus originally included five species: C. tyrannina, C. serva, C. nigrescens, C. laeta, and C. parkeri. In 2014, Mayer and colleagues identified fuscicauda as a separate species from C. nigrescens (SACC Proposal No. 636), increasing the total number of species in the genus to six.

== Diet and habitat ==
Antbirds in the genus Cercomacroides mainly feed on insects. Including beetles, grasshoppers, lepidopteran larvae, orthopterans, homopterans, and spiders, as well as other arthropods. By eating insects, Cercomacroides species act as natural pest controllers in the rainforest. They help reduce insect damage and support the balance of plant communities. These birds mostly live in the understorey of tropical lowland rainforests. They prefer dark, humid areas with dense vegetation, such as primary forests, mature secondary forests, and edges of degraded woodlands.

They are usually seen alone, in pairs, or in small family groups. They forage mainly between ground level and 5 meters high. They do not usually join mixed-species flocks. Their behavior is active but calm. They move in short hops, often pausing for a few seconds between jumps to look for prey. Their body posture can vary from almost horizontal to nearly upright, and their tails are held flat or slightly raised. While foraging, they may gently flick their wings. They search for prey among shrubs, fallen logs, vines, and leaf litter. Sometimes, they jump to the ground and flip over leaves to find food. Their movements are quick and flexible, which helps them move through the complex forest understory. They often pause briefly to watch for prey, then quickly strike from behind leaves, under branches, or among fallen leaves on the ground. Sometimes, they hang upside down from branches or climb vines to catch food.

Some species, such as C. tyrannina and C. nigrescens, sometimes follow army ants like Eciton burchellii. These ants move quickly through the forest and flush out many small animals, creating a chance for birds to catch exposed prey. Cercomacroides birds often forage in front of the ant swarm, catching insects that try to escape. This behaviour is called "ant-following foraging." However, Cercomacroides are not fully dependent on this method. They are considered "facultative ant-followers," meaning they only show this behavior in certain areas and at certain times.

These birds are highly adaptable and can forage successfully in both primary and secondary forests. They play an important role in the food web of the tropical forest understory.

== Breeding ==
The breeding behavior of Cercomacroides has not been fully studied, but some field observations have provided basic information.

Birds in this genus usually build their nests in low plants within tropical or secondary forests. Nests are typically placed between vines, shrubs, or small branches. They are well hidden and located about 0.5 to 2 meters above the ground. The nest has a deep pouch shape with a slightly upward-tilted opening. It is loosely woven but firmly attached using fine vines, moss, dry leaves, and plant fibers. In many species, the back of the nest is much higher than the front, giving the entrance a clearly slanted angle—this is a common feature across the genus. Nests are mostly attached to vertical plant structures, such as hanging fern stems or vines. The plant passes through the back of the nest, helping it hang securely. A few nests are found on horizontal bamboo branches, where the entrance becomes more circular. This nest shape helps with camouflage and may also reduce the risk of predators. The nest is made of two layers. The outer layer is built from green moss, black fern roots, bark, and dry bamboo leaves. The inner layer is made of fine bamboo leaves, fern pieces, and black thread-like fibers. The inside is soft and stable, making it suitable for incubation and chick care.

During the study, some nests were attacked by predators, especially lizards such as Tupinambis teguixin. This shows that even though the nests are well hidden, they still face some risk from predators.

Both male and female birds take part in building the nest, incubating the eggs, and feeding the chicks, showing a cooperative breeding style. Each nest usually contains two eggs. The eggs are beige or pale yellow with reddish-brown spots. The incubation period lasts about 14 to 20 days.

Taking the Black Antbird as an example, they use a shared incubation strategy. During the day, the male and female take turns incubating the eggs. The male mostly incubates in the morning, while the female takes the lead in the afternoon. At night, the female incubates alone. She stays on the nest from evening until the next morning, keeping a steady position with her head hidden inside the nest. Overall nest attentiveness is very high, reaching 84.7%. During the day, the parents leave the nest to forage about 5.7 times per day, with each trip lasting around 39 minutes. After hatching, chicks are fed by both parents. Newly hatched chicks have no feathers. Their skin is black, and their beaks are yellow with black tips. Within three days, feather tubes begin to grow, and after one week, brown feathers start to appear. They usually leave the nest after 15 to 17 days but still rely on their parents for food during the early period. The female feeds the chicks slightly more often, making up about 56% of all feeding. She also takes more responsibility for keeping the chicks warm during the day. During the hottest times, both parents stay at the nest to shade the chicks. At night, the female is fully responsible for caring for the chicks.

== Vocalisation ==
Vocalization is also an important feature. Males and females often sing in duet, but not at the same time. Each bird sings separately, with simple and clear rhythm. This helps maintain the pair bond. This type of singing is different from the synchronous duets in Cercomacra and has value in identifying the genus. This type of vocal pattern helps maintain close pair bonds in monogamous species. It also supports joint efforts to drive away intruding individuals, whether of the same or different species, helping to establish clear territories .Most birds in the family Thamnophilidae do not learn their songs. Their calls are thought to be instinctive and can help identify species.

Songs and calls
Listen to Cercomacroides on xeno-canto

Some species briefly raise their crown feathers when agitated or chirping, but do not have distinct crown feathers. Some species briefly raise their crown feathers when agitated or chirping, but do not have distinct crown feathers. This subtle response can sometimes be seen in courtship or alert states.

Many Cercomacroides species show similar patterns in their songs. Male songs usually start with a low note, followed by a series of short, repeated notes or trills. These notes often rise in pitch and speed up over time. Female songs are shorter, with higher pitch and fewer notes. They often include sudden breaks or falling tones. In most species, the female joins the male’s song after it starts. This duet singing is common in the genus and often happens between mates. It plays a role in social bonding and territory defence.

Even though different species have differences in rhythm, pitch, and note structure, the overall singing style of the genus is similar. Males and females have clear roles in singing. Besides songs, both sexes also make other calls, such as “chip” sounds, “chirr” calls, and nasal notes. These are used for daily contact, warning, and defending territory. Together, these sounds form an important part of how Cercomacroides birds communicate. They help individuals recognise each other, keep pair bonds, and coordinate breeding.

Each species has its own details in song, such as note pattern, pitch range, and speed. These small differences help prevent hybridisation and keep species genetically separate. Because of this, vocal differences are likely a sign of reproductive isolation, which supports species identification under the Biological Species Concept.

=== Vocal features ===
This table provides an overview of the vocal characteristics of six antbird species within the genus Cercomacroides.

Species Name	Male Song Features	Female Song Features	Special Notes
Willis’s Antbird (C. laeta)	Song made of "wuu" phrases, rhythm becomes faster	Higher pitch, slower rhythm	High duet coordination, strong pair bond
Blackish Antbird (C. nigrescens)	Starts with 4–7 short notes after the first tone, rhythm changes a lot	Duets with male, uses "wuu" sound	Song structure changes with location
Dusky Antbird (C. tyrannina)	Song pattern changes across regions (e.g., Mexico vs. Panama)	Shorter notes, faster rhythm	Has "begging call", sometimes imitates other species
Parker’s Antbird (C. parkeri)	Starts low, then speeds up quickly at the end	Short and fast, often joins after the male starts	Song is tighter and faster
Black Antbird (C. serva)	4–7 main notes followed by 2–4 "chip" sounds	Slightly lower pitch, slower rhythm	Special "chak" call, often heard
Riparian Antbird (C. fuscicauda)	Very fast notes after lead tone, sounds like "what-cheer"	Higher pitch than other species	Most notes, fastest rhythm, most complex structure
