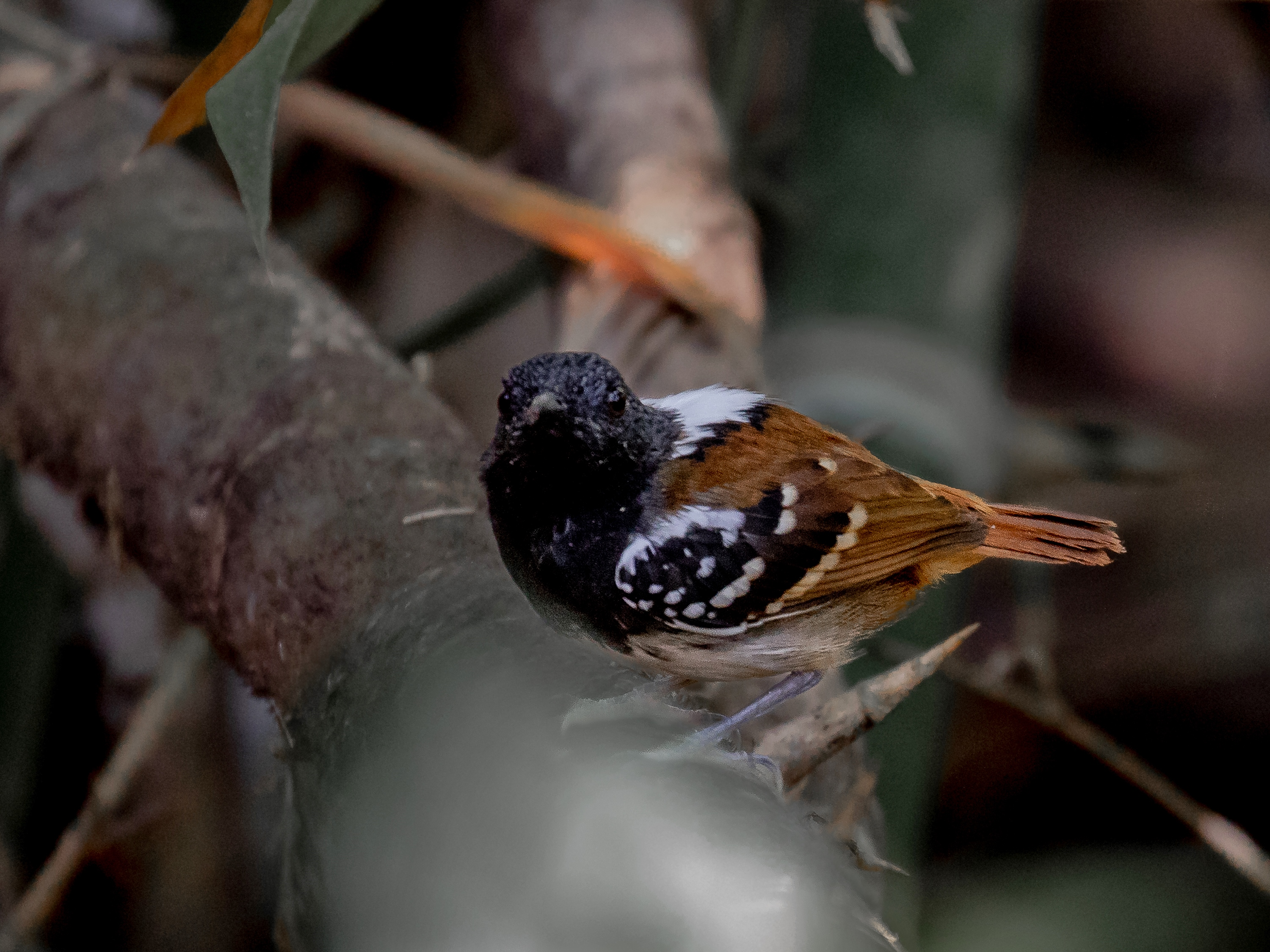
- At Rio Branco, Acre, Brazil

Conservation status
- Least Concern (IUCN 3.1)

Scientific classification
- Kingdom: Animalia
- Phylum: Chordata
- Class: Aves
- Order: Passeriformes
- Family: Thamnophilidae
- Genus: Sciaphylax
- Species: S. hemimelaena

Binomial name
- Sciaphylax hemimelaena (Sclater, PL, 1857)

= Southern chestnut-tailed antbird =

Species of bird

The southern chestnut-tailed antbird, or chestnut-tailed antbird, (Sciaphylax hemimelaena) is a species of passerine bird in subfamily Thamnophilinae of family Thamnophilidae, the "typical antbirds". It is found in Bolivia, Brazil, and Peru.

== Taxonomy and systematics ==
The southern chestnut-tailed antbird has a complicated taxonomic history. It was originally described by the English zoologist Philip Sclater in 1857 and given the binomial name Myrmeciza emimelaena. It later acquired the English name "chestnut-tailed antbird" and its current specific epithet hemimelaena. By the early twentieth century it had two recognized subspecies. In 1932 a third subspecies, M. h. castanea, was described. That subspecies was much later recognized as the separate species M. castanea. Some taxonomic systems call it the "northern chestnut-tailed antbird" and the reduced M. hemimelaena the "southern chestnut-tailed antbird". Other systems retained "chestnut-tailed antbird" for M. hemimelaena and called the newly-separated M. castanea "Zimmer's antbird".

A molecular phylogenetic study published in 2013 found that genus Myrmeciza, as then defined, was polyphyletic. In the resulting rearrangement to create monophyletic genera M. hemimelaena and M. castanea were moved to a newly erected genus Sciaphylax.

The southern chestnut-tailed antbird's two subspecies are the nominate S. h. hemimelaena (Sclater, PL, 1857) and S. h. pallens (Berlepsch & Hellmayr, 1905). There is some evidence that pallens might represent two taxa.

== Description ==
The southern chestnut-tailed antbird is 11 to 12 cm (4.3 to 4.7 in) long and weighs 14.5 to 16.5 g (0.51 to 0.58 oz). Males of the nominate subspecies have a mostly gray head and upper mantle with black centers to the feathers. The rest of their upperparts, their tail, and their flight feathers are dark yellowish red-brown. They have a white patch between the scapulars with black spots near the tips of the feathers. Their wing coverts are black with large white to buff-white tips. Their throat and upper breast are black, the center of their belly white to gray, and the rest of their underparts yellowish red-brown. They have a black bill. Females have a brown tinge on their crown, a reddish yellow-brown throat and breast, and a pale reddish yellow-brown to white belly. Their mandible is pale. Males of subspecies S. h. pallens have more white on their belly than the nominate; females are overall paler than the nominate.

== Distribution and habitat ==
The nominate subspecies of the southern chestnut-tailed antbird is found south of the Amazon and Marañón rivers in eastern Peru, in southwestern Amazonian Brazil east to the Madeira River and south to Acre state, and in northwestern Bolivia west of the Mamoré and Grande rivers. Subspecies S. h. pallens is found east of the nominate, in Brazil south of the Amazon from the Madeira into Pará and south to Rondônia and northern Mato Grosso, and in eastern Santa Cruz Department in Bolivia. The species primarily inhabits the understorey and floor of terra firme forest and nearby mature secondary forest. In Peru it also occurs in seasonally flooded forest and the transitional forest between it and terra firme. In parts of Brazil it is associated with bamboo and other herbaceous plants in gaps caused by fallen trees, but in Peru tends to avoid bamboo. In Brazil it occurs from near sea level up to 900 m (3,000 ft) and in Colombia reaches 1,500 m (4,900 ft).

== Behavior ==
=== Movement ===
The southern chestnut-tailed antbird is believed to be a year-round resident throughout its range.

=== Feeding ===
The southern chestnut-tailed antbird feeds on a variety of insects and probably also spiders and other arthropods. Single birds, pairs, and family groups usually forage on the ground or within about 1.5 m (5 ft) of it and only rarely higher. It occasionally joins mixed-species feeding flocks that pass through its territory. It typically clambers among fallen branches and hops and flutter-flies from one tangle to another. It feeds from vegetation by gleaning, reaching, and making short jumps from a perch and also probes leaf litter on the ground. It occasionally attends army ant swarms but spends little time with them.

=== Breeding ===
Two southern chestnut-tailed antbird nests are known; they were found in Bolivia in March and September. They were open cups made of palm leaves, other dead leaves, and rootlets hung in vegetation very near the ground. The clutch size appears to be two eggs. The incubation period, time to fledging, and details of parental care are not known.

=== Vocalization ===
The male southern chestnut-tailed antbird sings "a slow but accelerating, descending series of loud, chiming notes, usually ending with a quiet churred phrase: TEE TEE-tee-ti-tidjrdjr. Females sometimes answer with a "fairly even-paced, descending series of rising whistles" WEE-wee-wee-wee-wee-djr-djr. The species' calls are "a single, sharp pik, sometimes in [a] short series, and a quiet, descending, thin rattle".

== Status ==
The IUCN has assessed the southern chestnut-tailed antbird as being of Least Concern. It has a large range; its population size is not known and is believed to be stable. No immediate threats have been identified. It is considered fairly common to common in most of its range. Its range includes several formally protected areas and "also extensive areas of intact habitat which, although not formally protected, appear to be at little risk of development in near term".
