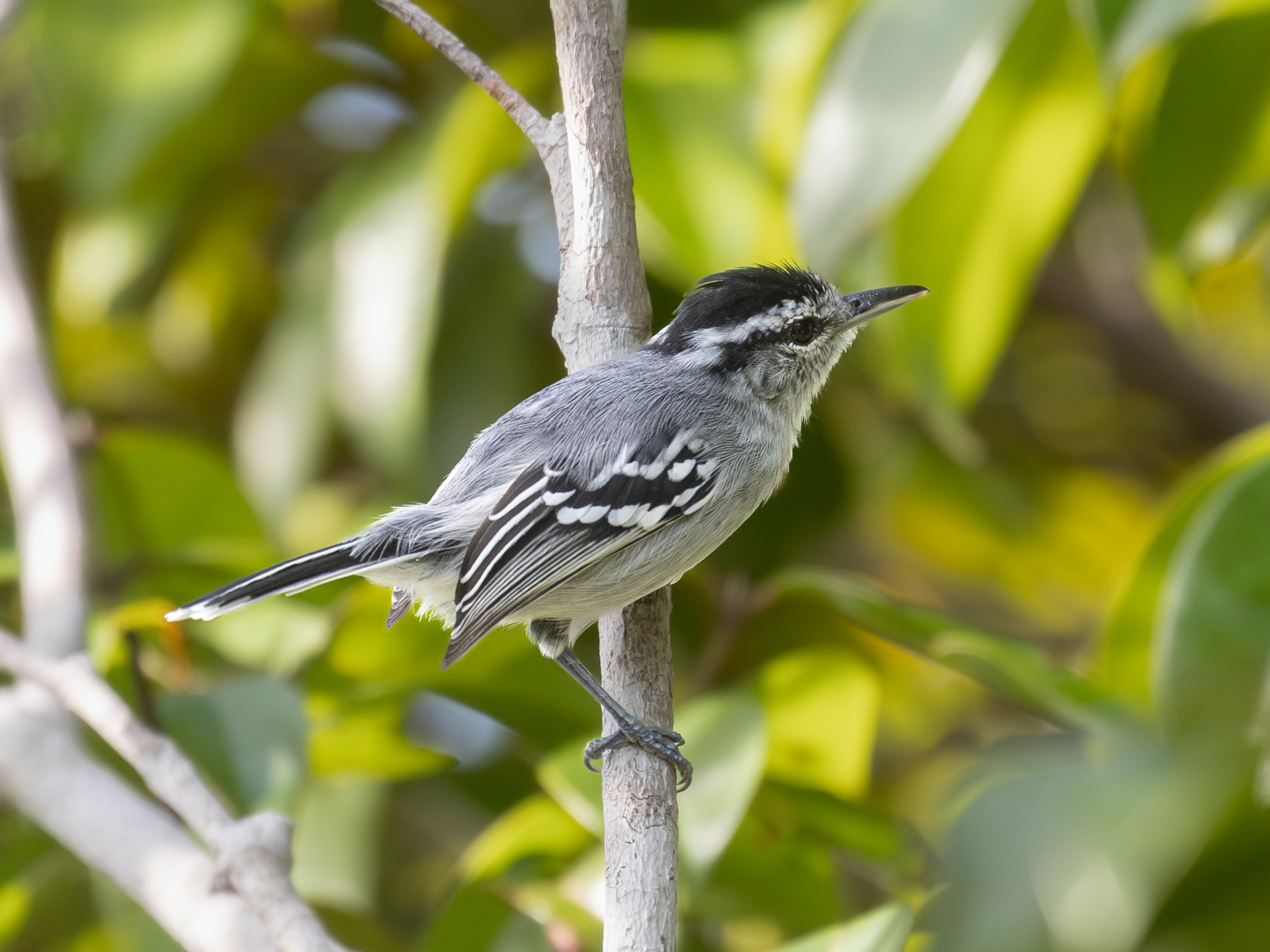

Conservation status
- Near Threatened (IUCN 3.1)

Scientific classification
- Kingdom: Animalia
- Phylum: Chordata
- Class: Aves
- Order: Passeriformes
- Family: Thamnophilidae
- Genus: Herpsilochmus
- Species: H. pileatus

Binomial name
- Herpsilochmus pileatus (Lichtenstein, MHC, 1823)

= Bahia antwren =

Species of bird in Brazil

The Bahia antwren (Herpsilochmus pileatus) or pileated antwren is a Vulnerable species of bird in subfamily Thamnophilinae of family Thamnophilidae, the "typical antbirds". It is endemic to Brazil.

== Taxonomy and systematics ==
The Bahia antwren has a rather tortuous taxonomic history. At one time its binomial Herpsilocmus pileatus applied to what is now the caatinga antwren (later H. sellowi and since 2021 Radinopsyche sellowi). What are now the black-capped antwren (H. atricapillus) and creamy-bellied antwren (H. motacilloides) were treated as conspecific with the Bahia antwren. The splitting into three species and the revision of binomials was achieved by the early 2000s. The Bahia and black-capped antwrens are now considered sister species.

The Bahia antwren is monotypic.

== Description ==
The Bahia antwren is 10.5 to 11 cm (4.1 to 4.3 in) long and weighs about 9 g (0.32 oz). Adult males have a black crown and nape, a long white to pale gray supercilium, and a black streak through the eye. The rest of their upperparts are gray with white-edged blackish scapulars and a white patch between them. Their wings are black with white tips on the coverts and white edges on the flight feathers. Their tail is black with white feather tips and white edges on the outermost. Their underparts are white with a gray wash. Adult females have a buffish forehead and black and white streaked crown. Their upperparts are gray with an olive tinge and their underparts white with an ochraceous tinge.

== Distribution and habitat ==
The Bahia antwren is found in coastal Bahia, Brazil, from south of Salvador to the area of Transcoso. It inhabits the mid-storey to the canopy of restinga woodlands, generally those on sandy soils. In elevation it ranges from sea level to 840 m (2,800 ft).

== Behavior ==
=== Movement ===
The Bahia antwren is believed to be a year-round resident throughout its range.

=== Feeding ===
The Bahia antwren's diet has not been detailed but includes insects and probably spiders. It forages singly, in pairs, and in family groups and sometimes as a member of a mixed-species feeding flock. It typically forages from about 5 m (20 ft) above the ground to the canopy but will feed lower in scrubby areas. It usually captures prey by gleaning from foliage, stems, vines, and branches, mostly by reaching or short lunges from a perch. It sometimes makes short sallies to grab prey or to hover-glean.

=== Breeding ===
Nothing is known about the Bahia antwren's breeding biology.

=== Vocalization ===
The Bahia antwren's song is a "fast series of very high, rising 'toot' notes, accelerating to a rattle" and lasts two to three seconds. Its calls include a "short note sounding like 'greep' " and a "rather slow-paced rattle".

== Status ==
The IUCN originally in 2002 assessed the Bahia antwren as Vulnerable and uplisted it to Near Threatened in 2023. It has a small and fragmented range and its estimated population of between 4200 and 13,000 mature individuals is believed to be decreasing. "Coastal forests in Bahia have suffered tremendous reduction in size during the last few decades. Logging companies and conversion to pastures are among the factors that have contributed to the deforestation process." It is considered common in the few areas it inhabits and is found in at least two protected areas. However, "[p]lanned large-scale developments of beach resorts in S coastal Bahia could have a major negative impact on the conservation status of this species".
