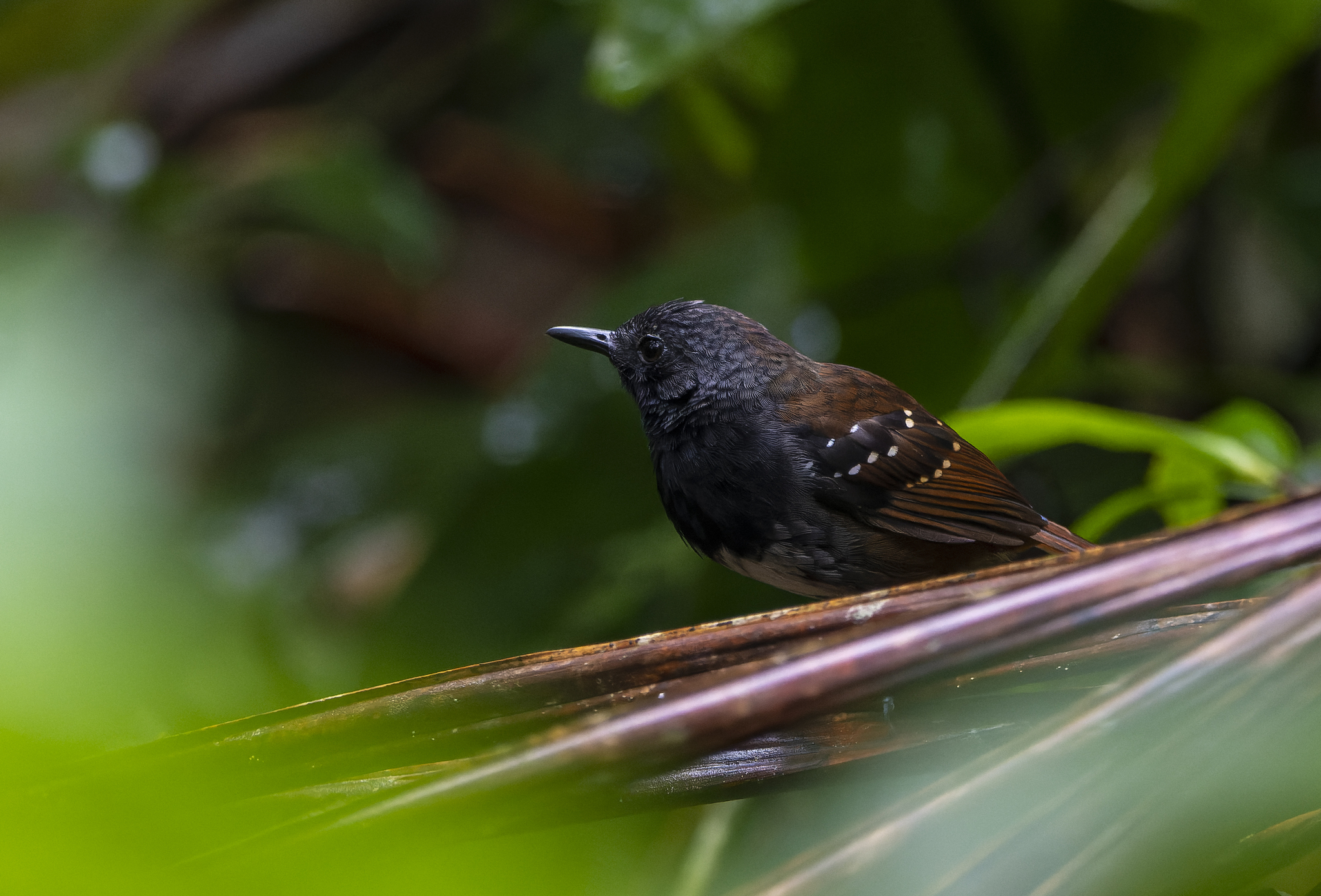

Conservation status
- Least Concern (IUCN 3.1)

Scientific classification
- Kingdom: Animalia
- Phylum: Chordata
- Class: Aves
- Order: Passeriformes
- Family: Thamnophilidae
- Genus: Sciaphylax
- Species: S. castanea

Binomial name
- Sciaphylax castanea (Zimmer, JT, 1932)

Synonyms
- Myrmeciza hemimelaena castanea; Myrmeciza castanea

= Northern chestnut-tailed antbird =

Species of bird

The northern chestnut-tailed antbird, or Zimmer's antbird, (Sciaphylax castanea) is a species of bird in subfamily Thamnophilinae of family Thamnophilidae, the "typical antbirds". It is found in Colombia, Ecuador, and Peru.

== Taxonomy and systematics ==
The northern chestnut-tailed antbird was originally described by the American ornithologist John Zimmer in 1932 as a subspecies of the then chestnut-tailed antbird with the trinomial name Myrmeciza hemimelaena castanea. In the early 21st century it was recognized as a separate species, M. castanea, and split from H. hemimemaena. At that time a second subspecies of it was also recognized. Some taxonomic systems call it the "northern chestnut-tailed antbird" and the reduced M. hemimelaena the "southern chestnut-tailed antbird". Other systems called the newly-separated M. castanea "Zimmer's antbird" and retained "chestnut-tailed antbird" for M. hemimelaena.

A molecular phylogenetic study published in 2013 found that genus Myrmeciza, as then defined, was polyphyletic. In the resulting rearrangement to create monophyletic genera M. hemimelaena and M. castanea were moved to a newly erected genus Sciaphylax.

The two subspecies of the northern chestnut-tailed antbird are the nominate S. c. castanea (Zimmer, JT, 1932) and S. c. centunculorum (M.L. Isler, A. Alvarez, P.R. Isler, Valqui, Begazo & Whitney, 2002).

== Description ==
The northern chestnut-tailed antbird is 11 to 12 cm (4.3 to 4.7 in) long and weighs 16 to 17 g (0.56 to 0.60 oz). Males of the nominate subspecies have a mostly gray head with black centers to the feathers. Their hindcrown, nape, and upper mantle are a browner gray. The rest of their upperparts, their tail, and their flight feathers are dark yellowish red-brown. They have a white patch between the scapulars with black spots near the tips of the feathers. Their wing coverts are black with large white to buff-white tips. Their throat, upper breast, and sides of their belly are black, the center of their belly white, and the rest of their underparts yellowish red-brown. Females have paler upperparts than males and mostly reddish yellow-brown underparts with a white belly. Both sexes have a black bill. Males of subspecies S. c. centunculorum have a more uniformly gray crown and more white on the underparts than the nominate. Females are paler than the nominate.

== Distribution and habitat ==
The nominate subspecies of the northern chestnut-tailed antbird is found in southeastern Ecuador's Zamora-Chinchipe Province and northern Peru's Department of San Martín. Subspecies S. c. centunculorum is found from Putumayo Department in extreme southern Colombia south very locally through eastern Ecuador into northeastern Peru's Department of Loreto. The species primarily inhabits the understorey and floor of terra firme forest. It almost exclusively occurs in somewhat stunted forest growing on nutrient-poor sandy soils. In elevation it ranges between 125 and 1,000 m (400 and 3,300 ft) in Colombia and up to 1,350 m (4,400 ft) in Peru. In Ecuador it mostly occurs below 350 m (1,100 ft) but locally reaches 1,450 m (4,800 ft).

== Behavior ==
=== Movement ===
The northern chestnut-tailed antbird is believed to be a year-round resident throughout its range.

=== Feeding ===
The northern chestnut-tailed antbird's diet has not been detailed; it is assumed to feed on insects and other arthropods. Single birds, pairs, and family groups usually forage on the ground or within about 1 m (3 ft) of it and only rarely higher. It rarely joins mixed-species feeding flocks or attends army ant swarms. Its other foraging behavior is assumed to be similar to that of its former "parent" S. hemimelaena, which see here.

=== Breeding ===
Nothing is known about the northern chestnut-tailed antbird's breeding biology.

=== Vocalization ===
The northern chestnut-tailed antbird's song is "a slow but accelerating, rising series of loud whistled notes TEW TEW-tew-tu'ti'ti'ti'ter'tu" whose last note or two are occasionally at a lower pitch. Its calls are "a quiet, descending, throaty churred rattle" and "a dry tchit or tchit-it, often in a short series".

== Status ==
The IUCN has assessed the northern chestnut-tailed antbird as being of Least Concern. Its population size is not known and is believed to be decreasing. No immediate threats have been identified. It occurs in one protected area in Peru. The nominate "has [an] extremely limited range, within a region that is under intense human pressure for cultivation of coca, coffee and other crops, as well as exploitation of forest for firewood and human settlement". "Lowland subspecies centunculorum is less geographically restricted but has [a] patchy distribution, and its known varillal and irapayal habitats are under intense human pressure."
