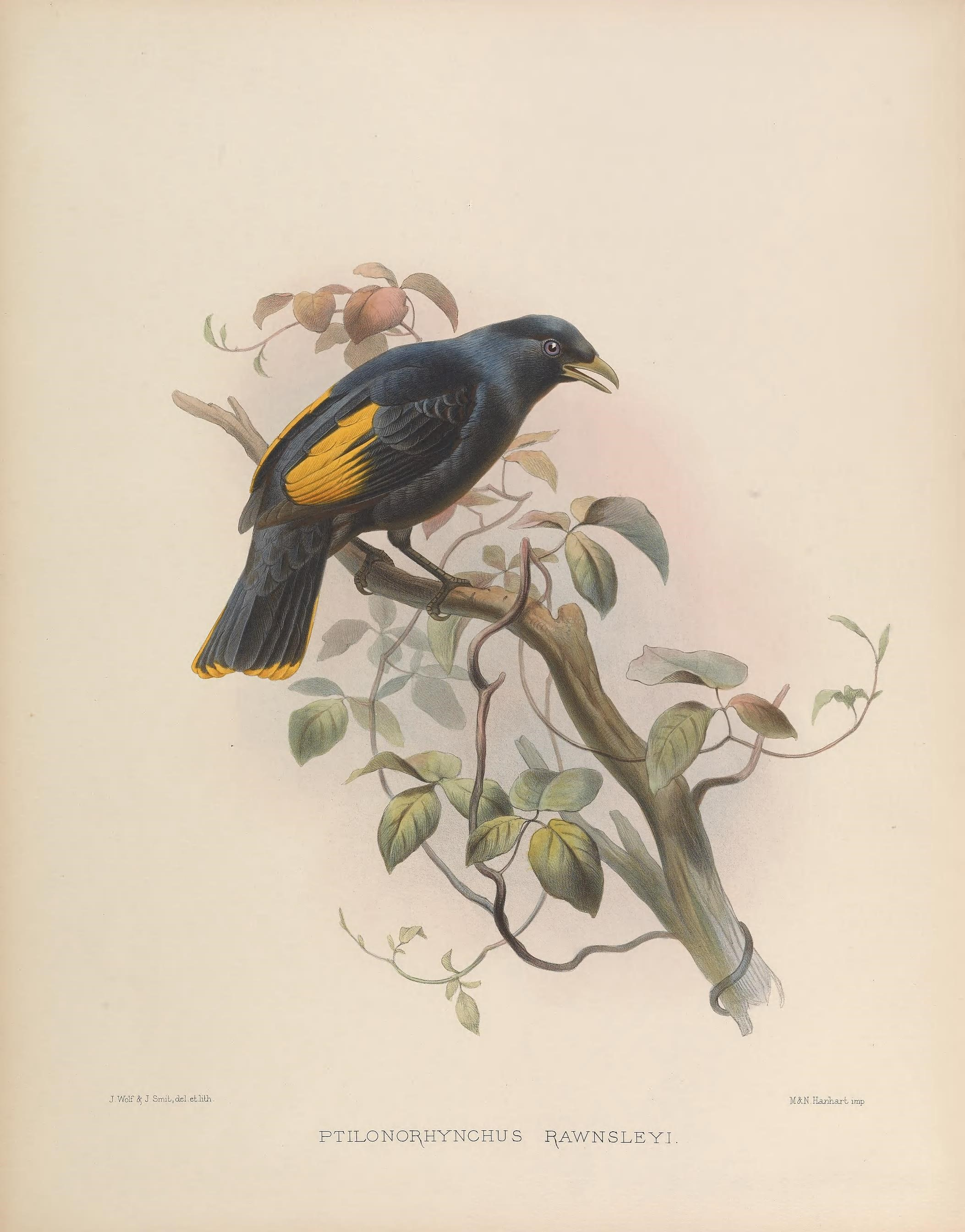

Scientific classification
- Kingdom: Animalia
- Phylum: Chordata
- Class: Aves
- Order: Passeriformes
- Infraorder: Climacterides
- Family: Ptilonorhynchidae
- Hybrid: Ptilonorhynchus violaceus × Sericulus chrysocephalus

Synonyms
- Ptilonorhynchus rawnsleyi Diggles, 1867

= Rawnsley's bowerbird =

Rawnsley's bowerbird, also known as Rawnsley's satin bird or the blue regent, is a rare intergeneric hybrid between satin bowerbird (Ptilonorhynchus violaceus) and regent bowerbird (Sericulus chrysocephalus).

== Type specimen ==
It is based on a unique specimen collected by Henry Charles Rawnsley at Witton, in Brisbane, Queensland, Australia, on 14 July 1867. It was described and illustrated (as Ptilonorhynchus rawnsleyi) in the same year by Silvester Diggles in Part 15 of his three-volume work The Ornithology of Australia. It had at various times been considered to be a valid bowerbird species, an aberrant individual of the satin bowerbird, or an adult hybrid individual resulting from the natural crossing of a regent bowerbird with a satin bowerbird. The specimen was lost prior to 1950.

== Photographs ==
A second example was not recorded until sightings and photographic evidence of another bird were obtained in November 2003 and January 2004 at Beechmont, South East Queensland, adjacent to the Lamington National Park. A further example, a mature male, was photographed in Kalang, New South Wales, in 2014, and was identified by reference to its description on Wikipedia.

== Description ==
The specimen was described as being in adult male plumage, mainly the glossy blue-black colouring of the adult male satin bowerbird, but with a conspicuous and extensive yellow wing patch, yellow tipping to some tail feathers, with a paler iris colour than the satin bowerbird, and intermediate in size between the two putative parent species.
