= Fire-maned bowerbird =

Conservation status
- Near Threatened (IUCN 3.1)

Scientific classification
- Kingdom: Animalia
- Phylum: Chordata
- Class: Aves
- Order: Passeriformes
- Family: Ptilonorhynchidae
- Genus: Sericulus
- Species: S. bakeri

Binomial name
- Sericulus bakeri (Chapin, 1929)

Synonyms
- Adelbert Regent bowerbird Adelbert bowerbird

Species of bird

The fire-maned bowerbird (Sericulus bakeri) is a medium-sized, approximately 27 cm (11 in) long, bowerbird that inhabits and endemic to the forests of the Adelbert Range in Papua New Guinea. The striking male is black with fiery orange crown and upperback, elongated neck plumes, yellow iris and golden yellow wing patch. The female is a brown bird with brown-barred whitish underparts.

Its diet consists mainly of figs, ants and insects. The bower itself is that of "avenue"-type with two sides of wall of sticks.

The fire-maned bowerbird was discovered in 1928 by Rollo Beck. The female was unknown to science until 1959.

Due to ongoing habitat loss and limited range, the fire-maned bowerbird is evaluated as near threatened on the IUCN Red List of Threatened Species.
