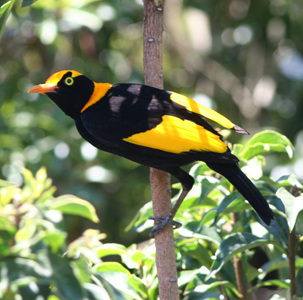
- Regent bowerbird (Sericulus chrysocephalus)

Scientific classification
- Kingdom: Animalia
- Phylum: Chordata
- Class: Aves
- Order: Passeriformes
- Family: Ptilonorhynchidae
- Genus: Sericulus; Swainson, 1825

Type species
- Meliphaga chrysocephalus Lewin, 1808

= Sericulus =

Genus of birds

Sericulus is a genus of brightly coloured passerine birds belonging to the bowerbird family Ptilonorhynchidae. They are found in New Guinea and eastern Australia.

Birds in this genus build "avenue-type" bowers which consist of two parallel walls made of vertical sticks and pieces of grass.

== Taxonomy ==
The genus Sericulus was introduced in 1825 by the English zoologist William Swainson for the species Meliphaga chrysocephalus, the regent bowerbird, that had been formally described by John Lewin in 1808. Meliphaga chrysocephalus therefore becomes the type species by monotypy. The genus name is a diminutive of the Ancient Greek σηρικον/sērikon meaning "silk".

=== Species ===
The genus contains four species.

Image	Name	Common name	Distribution
	Sericulus aureus	Masked bowerbird	montane Bird's Head and Neck (northwest New Guinea) to east central New Guinea
	Sericulus ardens	Flame bowerbird	south central New Guinea
	Sericulus bakeri	Fire-maned bowerbird	Adelbert Range (northeast New Guinea)
	Sericulus chrysocephalus	Regent bowerbird	eastern Australia, from central Queensland to New South Wales
