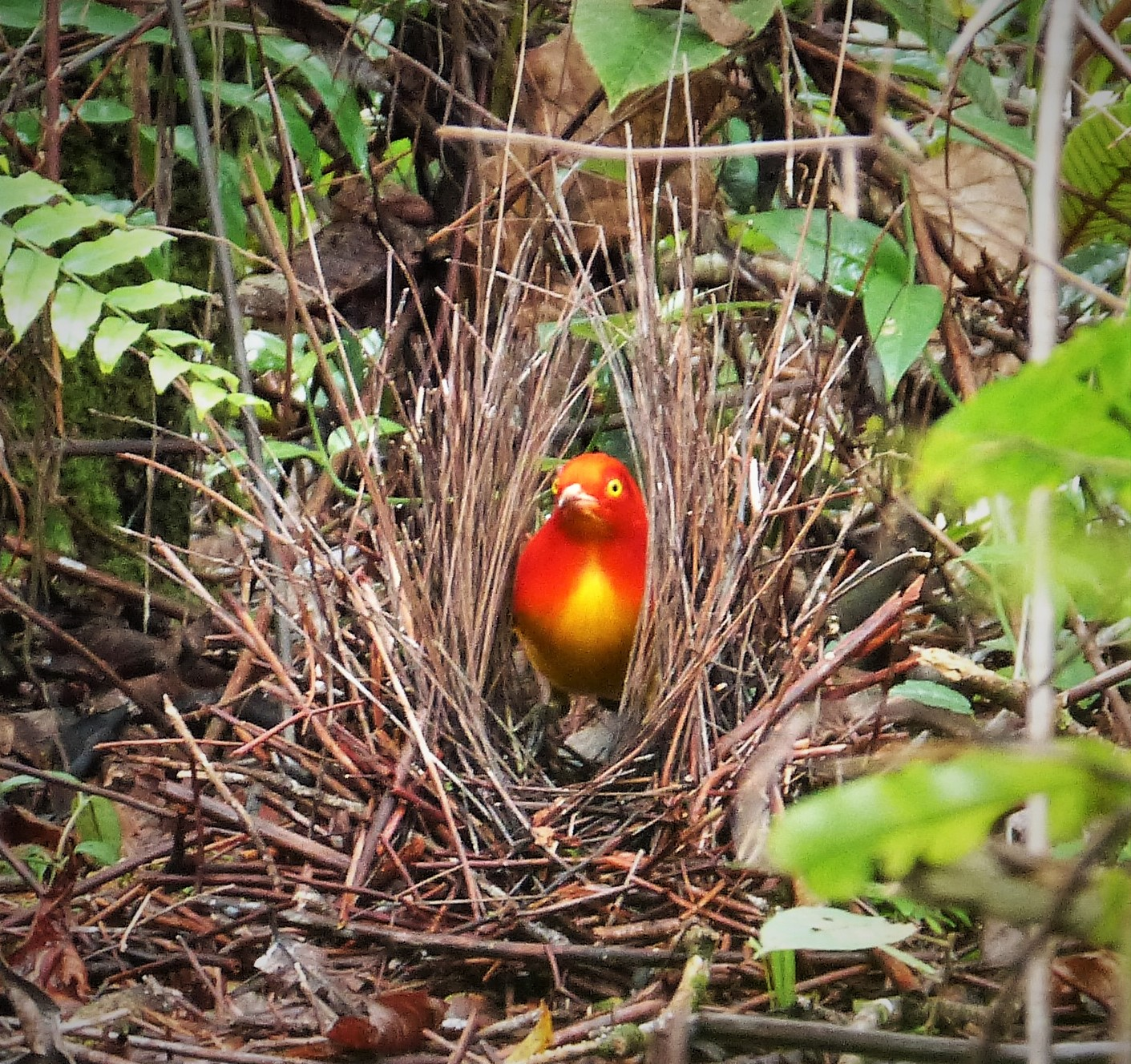

Conservation status
- Least Concern (IUCN 3.1)

Scientific classification
- Kingdom: Animalia
- Phylum: Chordata
- Class: Aves
- Order: Passeriformes
- Family: Ptilonorhynchidae
- Genus: Sericulus
- Species: S. ardens

Binomial name
- Sericulus ardens (D'Albertis & Salvadori, 1879)

= Flame bowerbird =

Species of bird

The flame bowerbird (Sericulus ardens) is one of the most bright coloured bowerbirds. The male is a medium-sized bird, up to 25 cm long, with flame orange and golden yellow plumage, elongated neck plumes and yellow-tipped black tail. It builds an "avenue-type" bower with two side walls of sticks. The female is an olive brown bird with yellow or golden around the stomach.

The flame bowerbird is distributed in and endemic to rainforests of southern New Guinea. The male flame bowerbird also has a courtship display along with his bower, twisting his tails and his wings to the side, and then shaking his head quickly.

The courtship behaviour of the flame bowerbird was filmed by Japanese photographer Tadashi Shimada in Dancers on Fire, a documentary that aired on the Smithsonian Channel, and has also been documented in Dancing with the Birds. Shimada additionally filmed some flame bowerbirds engaged in same-sex courting behavior, such as a male courting a juvenile male and several juvenile males as well as an adult male appearing to share one bower, only to be destroyed by another juvenile male.

The flame bowerbird is evaluated as least concerned on the IUCN Red List of Threatened Species.
