= Rowena Birkett =

Australian scientific illustrator and artist (1860–1915)

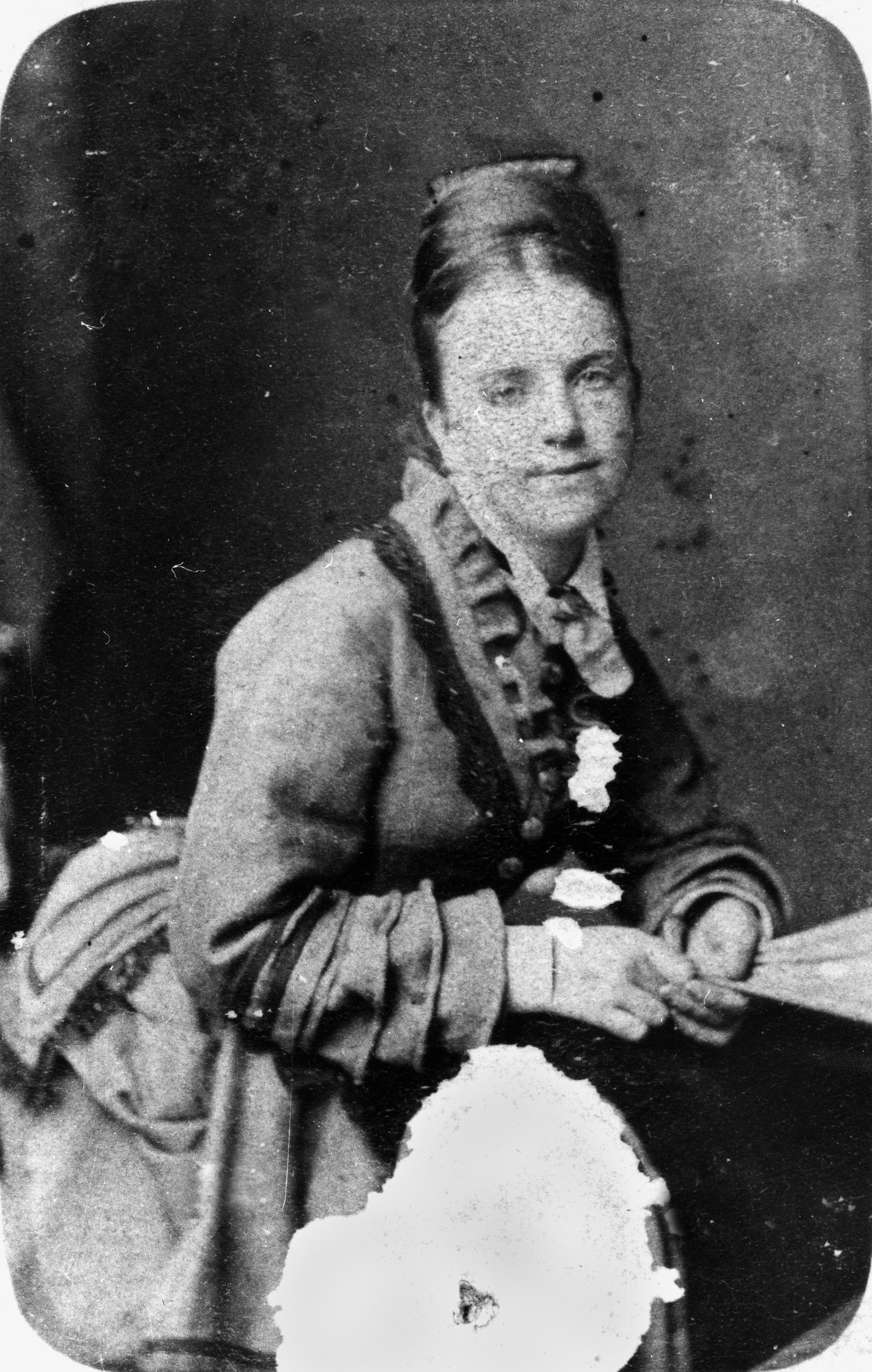
- Born: Rowena Birkett; 3 November 1860; Sydney
- Died: 17 July 1915 (aged 54); Sandgate, Queensland
- Occupations: Illustrator, artist, musician
- Spouse: William Cumming

Rowena Birkett (3 November 1860 – 17 July 1915) was an Australian natural history illustrator and artist. Prior to her marriage in 1882 Rowena was the protege of her uncle Silvester Diggles during the last decade of his life. She provided assistance hand-colouring lithographic prints for his publication Companion to Gould's Handbook and produced completed drawings for Diggles' unfinished project on Australian insects.

== Early life ==
Rowena Birkett was born on 3 November 1860 in the inner Sydney suburb of Newtown, the second daughter of Richard Birkett and Elizabeth (née Palmer). In 1863 Rowena's father was elected to the position of auditor for the Newtown Municipal Council.

In 1872 Rowena, aged twelve, went to live at the Queensland home of her aunt and uncle in Wharf Street at Kangaroo Point, an inner southern suburb of Brisbane. Her uncle was Silvester Diggles, a naturalist, artist and musician, married to Albina (née Birkett). As an accomplished artist and illustrator Diggles taught drawing at several private schools in Brisbane. He privately tutored his young niece after she came to live in the household. Rowena was known to have copied some of her uncle's landscape paintings and engaged in sketching around Kangaroo Point. Diggles also encouraged Rowena to develop her musical ability. At the age of thirteen she was the organist at St. Mary’s Anglican church at Kangaroo Point.

== Illustrations ==
Diggles had been a founding member of Queensland's first scientific institution, the Queensland Philosophical Society. He was a naturalist with a special interest in ornithology and entomology. In the 1860s he began work on the publication The Ornithology of Australia, of which twenty-one parts were issued from 1865 to 1870. Each part included six lithographed and hand-coloured plates (quarto size), with each illustration accompanied by a page of descriptive text. His output by 1870 had only covered about one third of the known Australian birds, at which stage Diggles had been forced to discontinue the publication from lack of funds.

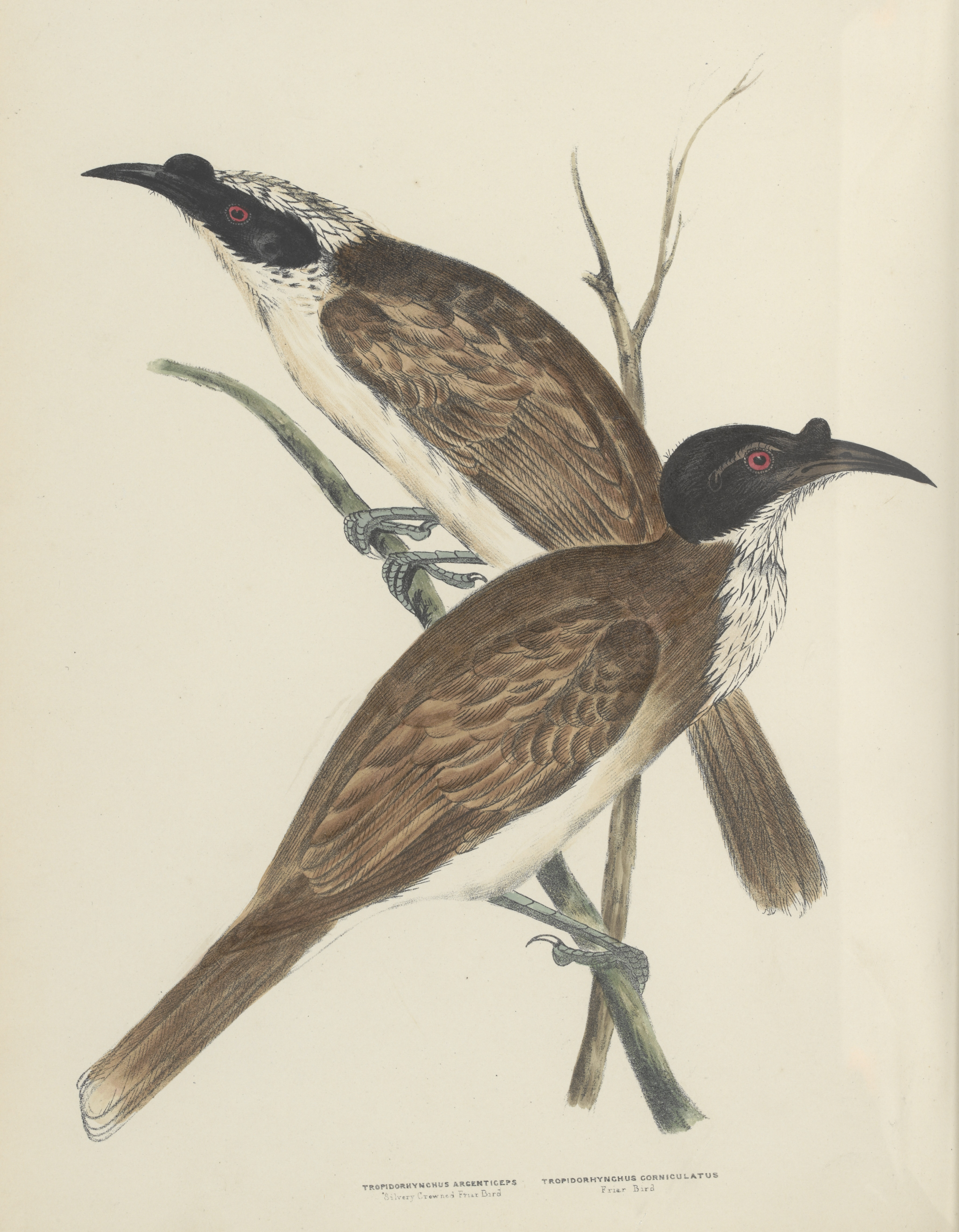
Hand-coloured lithographic print of Silver-crowned friarbird (Philemon argenticeps) and Noisy friarbird (Philemon corniculatus), published in Companion to Gould's Handbook (1877) by Silvester Diggles.

Diggles' health was beginning to fail from about 1875. Rather than continue with his Ornithology of Australia project, he produced his lithographic illustrations under a new title Companion to Gould's Handbook: or, Synopsis of the Birds of Australia, which was published in two volumes in 1877. The drawings on stone for the Companion to Gould's Handbook were mainly Diggles' work, with additional lithographic drawings done by Henry G. Eaton (mostly "faithful copies" of Diggles' original drawings). Rowena Birkett probably assisted her uncle by hand-colouring many of the printed copies for this publication, using Diggles' watercolour originals as a guide. When the Companion to Gould's Handbook went on sale in mid-1877 it was offered in two versions. The two volumes of the "coloured by hand" version cost twenty-five pounds (equivalent to A$3,932 in 2022), whereas the two uncoloured volumes sold for seven pounds and ten shillings (equivalent to A$1,179.55 in 2022). (Note: The evidence for Rowena assisting Diggles in the preparation and hand-colouring of lithographic plates depicting Australian birds comes from an article by the respected ornithologist A. H. Chisholm, published in The Australian Women's Mirror in February 1925. Chisholm wrote: "The late Mrs. Cummings, of Brisbane, was chief artist in respect of the 600 plates for the big work on Australian birds projected, in the 'seventies, by her uncle, the late Sylvester Diggles; the volumes were not completed, and the remaining plates are now in the Mitchell Library".)

In 1877 Diggles suffered a stroke and was left with "lingering paralysis", as a result of which he increasingly relied upon his niece and artistic protege. She became more directly involved in his next project, Australian Insects and Their Transformations, which her uncle had commenced in 1871. By 1878 twenty-six transformations had been completed, of which sixteen were signed and dated by Rowena in the last two years, in the process "developing her own more vigorous style" of drawing.

In 1879 Rowena Birkett left Brisbane to take up a position as a governess in North Queensland. (Note: One source records that Rowena "took a position as governess with the Lethbridge family near Roma".) Silvester Diggles died on 21 March 1880. Australian Insects and Their Transformations remained incomplete and unpublished and Rowena retained the whole series of drawings after the death of her uncle. (Note: A book of 126 drawings of butterflies and moths, by both Rowena Birkett (Cumming) and her uncle Silvester Diggles, remains with the family of Rowena's descendants.)

== Marriage ==
On 1 June 1882 Rowena Birkett married William Cumming in St. James' Anglican church in Townsville. Cumming was an employee of the Queensland National Bank, working as an accountant and teller at the Port Douglas branch. During her time at Port Douglas Rowena gave her services as organist to the St. Andrew's church choir. (Note: Rod Fisher, in his paper on Silvester Diggles published in 2000 in the Journal of the Royal Historical Society of Queensland, gives the following verdict on Rowena's marriage: "Her undoubted talents were later sapped by marriage and family life in North Queensland".)

In November 1883, "through continued ill-health", Cumming was transferred to the branch of the Queensland National Bank at Bundaberg, where the couple's three children (Albert, Beatrice Louise and Miranda Elsie) were born.

== Later life ==
By 1896 William Cumming had settled with his family at Eidsvold, where he became an auctioneer, mining broker and commission agent. Eidsvold, in the northern catchment of the Burnett River, had experienced a gold rush from the late 1880s. At Eidsvold Rowena was the organist at St. Andrew's Anglican church and taught piano to supplement the family income.

By about 1901 the family was living at Glassford Creek where Rowena worked as the postmistress and her husband carried on his business as an auctioneer. Rowena became a prominent figure in the township's Philharmonic Society.

In later years William and Rowena Cumming lived at Wolfram, a mining township in North Queensland, where her son had settled. Rowena had been "ailing for a number of years" when she left Wolfram to live with her daughter in Brisbane.

In July 1915 Rowena Cumming became ill and was moved to a nursing home at Sandgate, near Brisbane, where she died on 17 July 1915, aged 54.

== Sources ==
- Byrne, Dianne (2011) [1999]. "Rowena Birkett". Design & Art Australia Online.
- Fisher, Rod (2000). "Silvester Diggles: Brisbane's Pioneer Musician, Scientist, Artist and New Churchman". Journal of the Royal Historical Society of Queensland. 17 (6, May 2000): 271–286.
- Marks, E. N. (1972). "Silvester Diggles (1817–1880)". Australian Dictionary of Biography. Vol. 4. National Centre of Biography, Australian National University. ISBN 978-0-522-84459-7. ISSN 1833-7538. OCLC 70677943.
