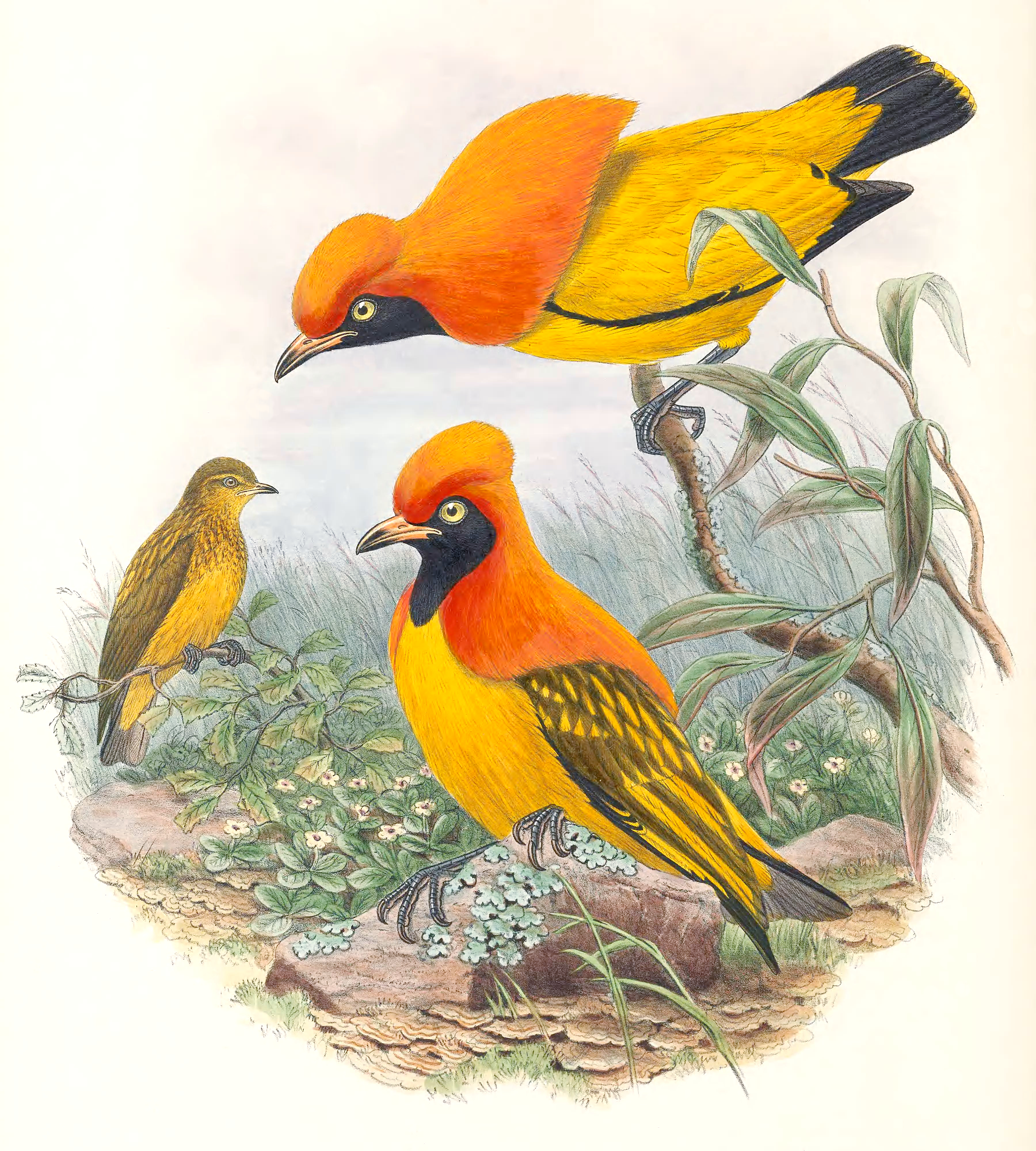
- Males displaying to a female masked bowerbird, Sericulus aureus, illustrated by John Gould (1804–1881)

Conservation status
- Least Concern (IUCN 3.1)

Scientific classification
- Kingdom: Animalia
- Phylum: Chordata
- Class: Aves
- Order: Passeriformes
- Family: Ptilonorhynchidae
- Genus: Sericulus
- Species: S. aureus

Binomial name
- Sericulus aureus (Linnaeus, 1758)

Synonyms
- Coracias aurea Linnaeus, 1758; Oriolus aureus Linnaeus, 1766

= Masked bowerbird =

Species of bird

The masked bowerbird (Sericulus aureus) is endemic to rainforests of New Guinea. It is one of the most brilliantly coloured bowerbirds. The male is a medium-sized bird, up to 25cm long, with flame orange and golden yellow plumage, elongated neck plumes and yellow-tipped black tail. It builds an "avenue-type" bower with two side walls of sticks. The female is an olive brown bird with yellow or golden below.

== Behaviour ==
All male bowerbirds build bowers, which can be simple ground clearings or elaborate structures, to attract female mates. The masked bowerbird makes a simple avenue bower consisting of two rows of sticks and small numbers of decorations which may include forest fruits and snail shells. Like other congeneric species, field observations indicate that males spend comparatively little time at their bower and are quick to abandon the structure for a nearby rebuild after disturbance from competitor males. Such a rebuild can be completed in less than an hour.

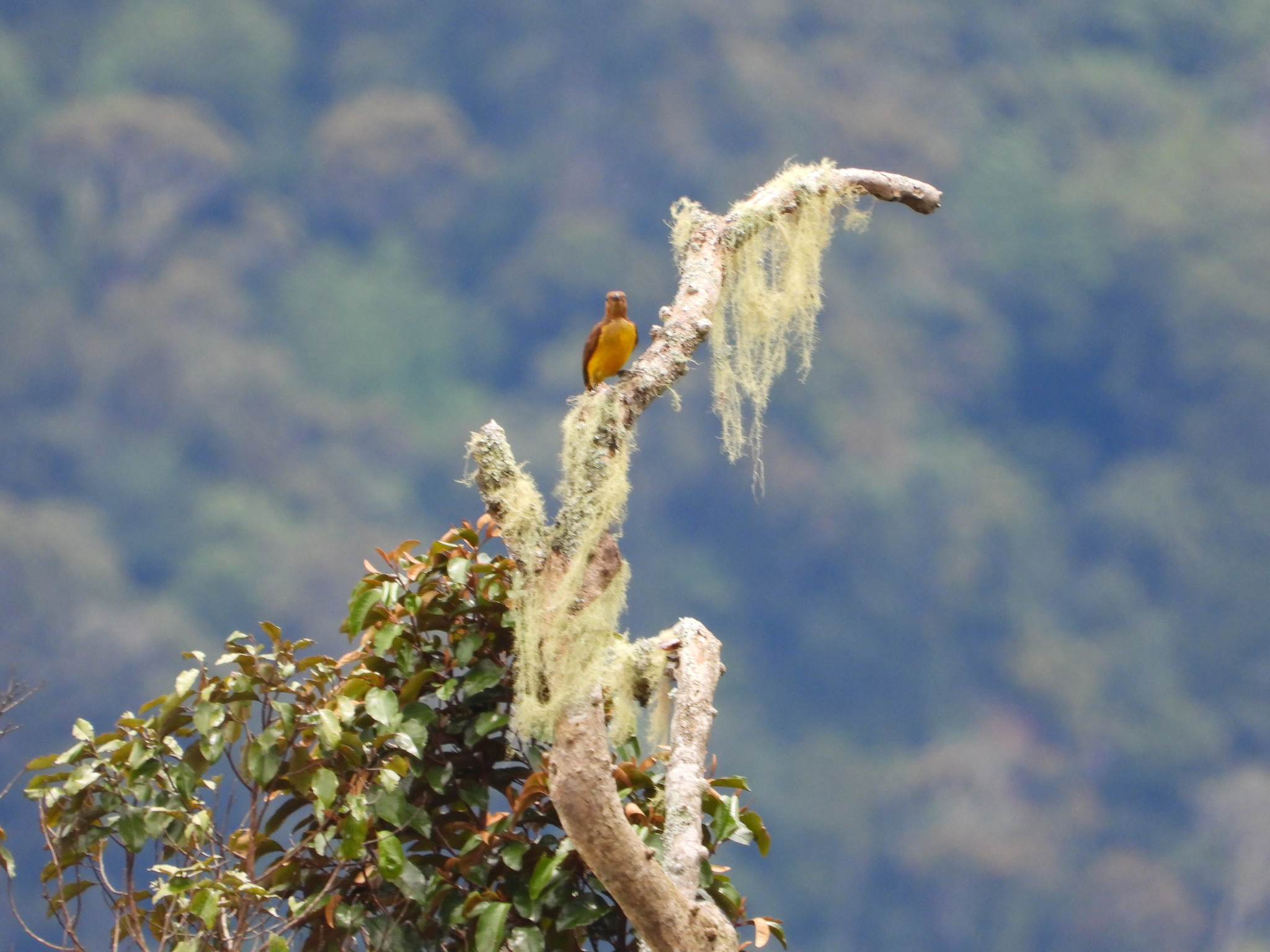
Live bird

== Taxonomy ==
The masked bowerbird was formally described in 1758 by the Swedish naturalist Carl Linnaeus in the tenth edition of his Systema Naturae under the binomial name Coracias aurea. He cited the earlier description and illustration of the "golden bird of paradise" by the English naturalist George Edwards. Linnaeus specified the type locality as Asia but this has been corrected to the Bird's Head Peninsula (Vogelkop) in northwestern New Guinea. The specific epithet aureus is Latin meaning "golden. The masked bowerbird is now one of four species placed in the genus Sericulus that was introduced in 1825 by the English ornithologist William Swainson. The species is monotypic: no subspecies are recognised.

The masked bowerbird is distributed in and endemic to rainforests of New Guinea. This species is the first bowerbird described by naturalists. Because of the male's beautifully coloured plumage, it was previously thought to be a bird-of-paradise. Indeed, the male flame bowerbird also has a courtship display along with his bower. He twists his tails and his wings to the side, and then shakes his head quickly.

The masked bowerbird is evaluated as least concern on the IUCN Red List of Threatened Species.
