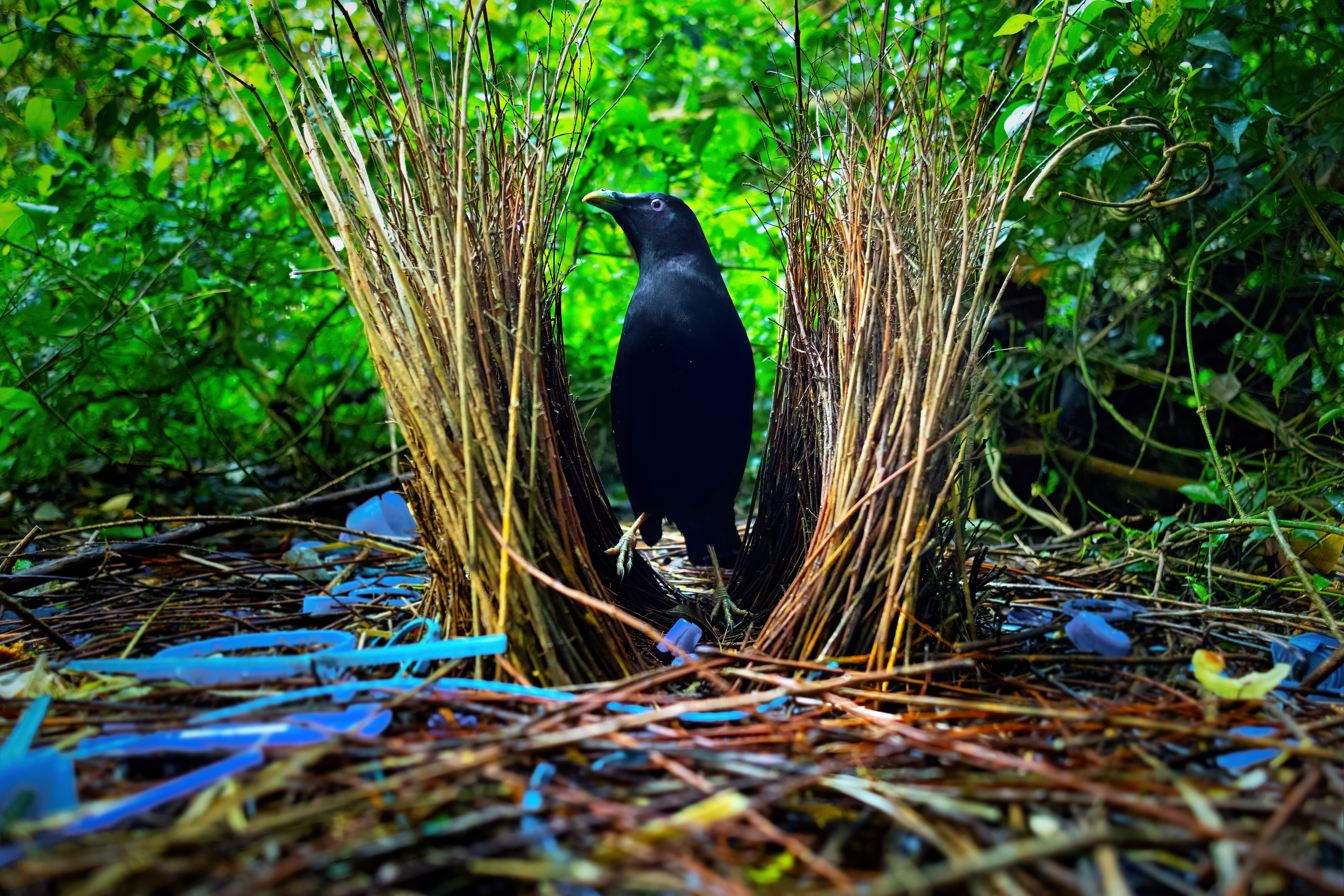
- Male at bower
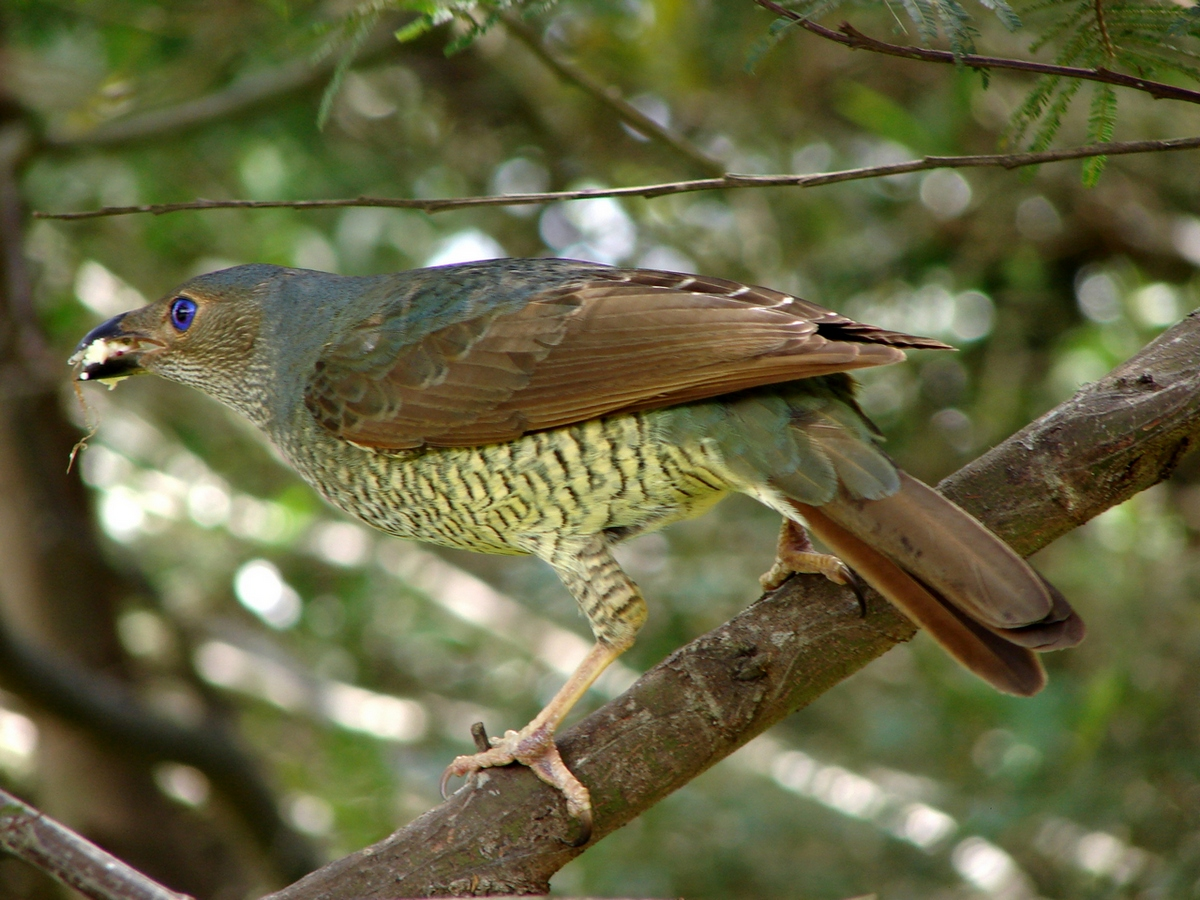
- Female

Conservation status
- Least Concern (IUCN 3.1)

Scientific classification
- Kingdom: Animalia
- Phylum: Chordata
- Class: Aves
- Order: Passeriformes
- Family: Ptilonorhynchidae
- Genus: Ptilonorhynchus; Kuhl, 1820
- Species: P. violaceus

Binomial name
- Ptilonorhynchus violaceus (Vieillot, 1816)

= Satin bowerbird =

Species of bird

The satin bowerbird (Ptilonorhynchus violaceus) is a species of passerine bird in the bowerbird family Ptilonorhynchidae that is endemic to eastern Australia. It is the only species placed in the genus Ptilonorhynchus.

== Taxonomy ==
The satin bowerbird was formally described in 1816 by the French ornithologist Louis Vieillot. He placed it with the choughs in the genus Pyrrhocorax and coined the binomial name Pyrrhocorax violaceus. Vieillot specified the type locality as "Nouvelle-Hollande" which is taken to be Sydney in New South Wales, Australia. The satin bowerbird is now the only species placed in the genus Ptilonorhynchus that was introduced in 1820 by German naturalist Heinrich Kuhl. He specified the type species as Ptilonorhynchus holosericeus, which is a junior synonym of Vieillot's Pyrrhocorax violaceus. The genus name Ptilonorhynchus combines the Ancient Greek πτιλον/ptilon meaning "feather" with ῥυγχος/rhunkhos meaning "bill". The specific epithet violaceus is Latin meaning "violet-coloured".

A molecular phylogenetic study published in 2020 found that the genus Ptilonorhynchus was sister to the genus Chlamydera.

Two subspecies are recognised:

- P. v. violaceus (Vieillot, 1816) – southeast Queensland to southeast Victoria (southeast Australia)
- P. v. minor Campbell, AJ, 1912 – southeast Cape York Peninsula, northeast Queensland (northeast Australia)

A rare natural intergeneric hybrid between the satin bowerbird and the regent bowerbird is known as Rawnsley's bowerbird.

== Description ==
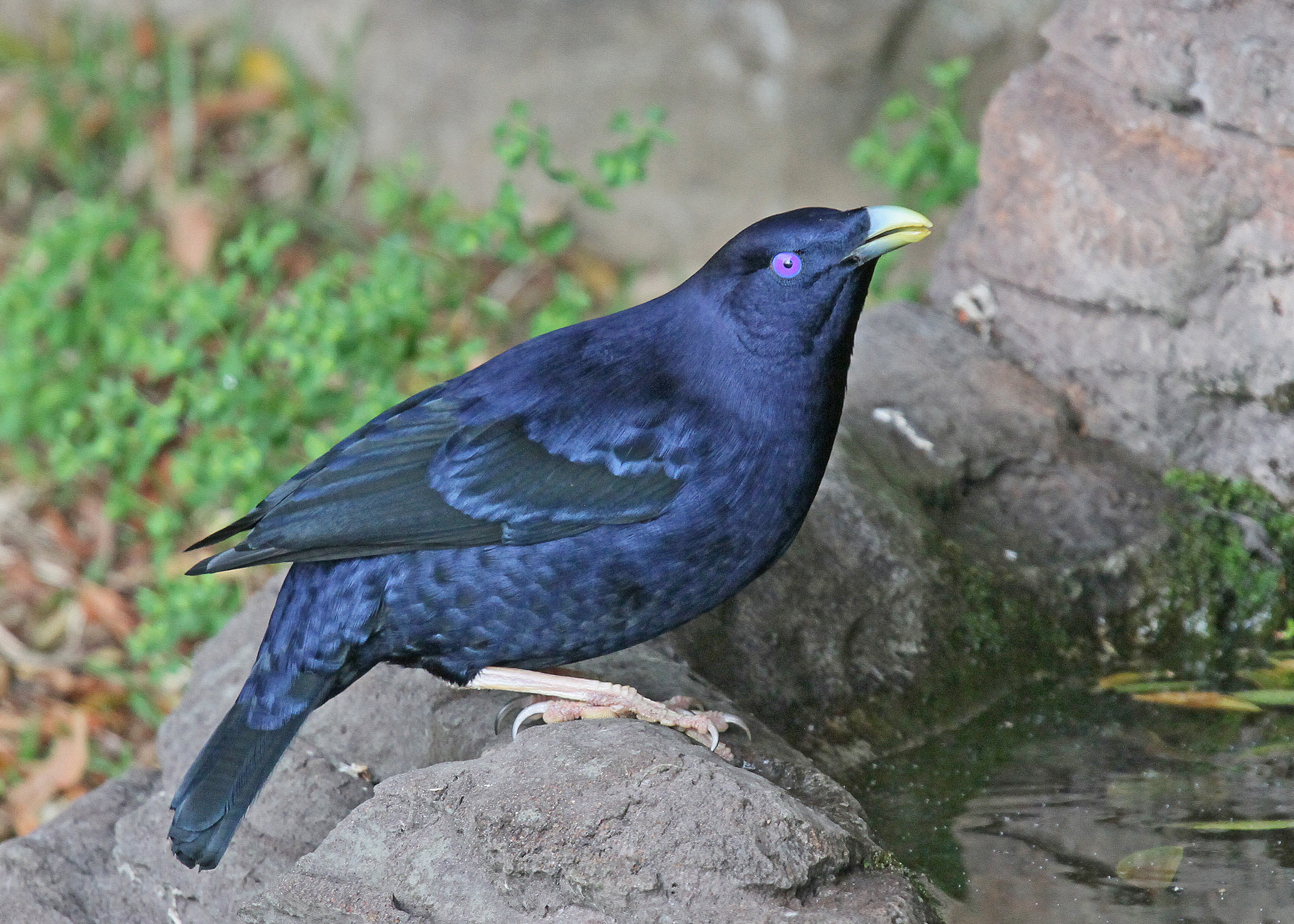
Satin bowerbird in Lamington National Park, Queensland, Australia

Mature males have violet-blue eyes and are uniformly coloured black, however, light diffraction by the surface texture of the feathers results in an almost metallic sheen giving a deep shiny blue appearance. Immature males are coloured and marked the same as females and are often mistaken for them.

Females might be mistaken for the green catbird or spotted catbird with distinctively green/brown or otherwise entirely brown upper body and lighter under body with a distinct reticulated or scalloped pattern, but with very striking blue eyes.

== Distribution ==
The satin bowerbird is common in rainforest and tall moist sclerophyll forest in eastern Australia from southern Queensland to Victoria. There is also an isolated population in the Wet Tropics of north Queensland.

== Diet ==
Like all Ptilonorhynchidae, satin bowerbirds are predominantly frugivorous as adults, though they also eat leaves and a small amount of seeds and insects. As nestlings, however, they are largely fed on beetles, grasshoppers and cicadas until they can fly.

Satin bowerbirds are not in the least finicky in their food preferences, and have taken extremely readily to the numerous plants introduced since European settlement. Indeed, they are a major dispersal agent for a number of weedy plants, such as camphor laurel, the European olive and various species of privet. They are also often persecuted by horticulturalists because they frequently raid fruit and vegetable crops. Satin bowerbirds are aggressive when foraging, frequently attempting to displace other birds from fruit trees.

== Courtship ==
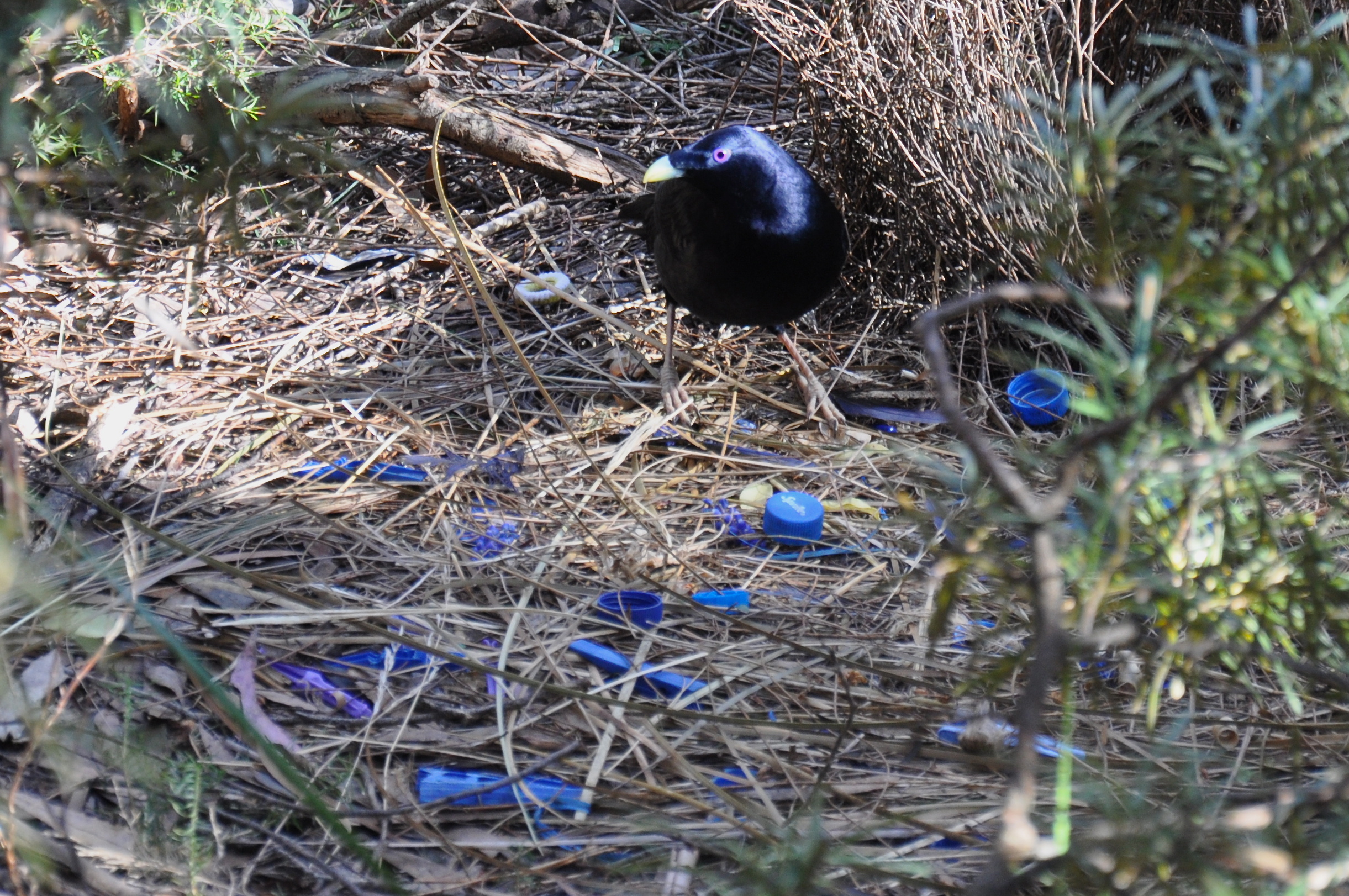
A male building the bower

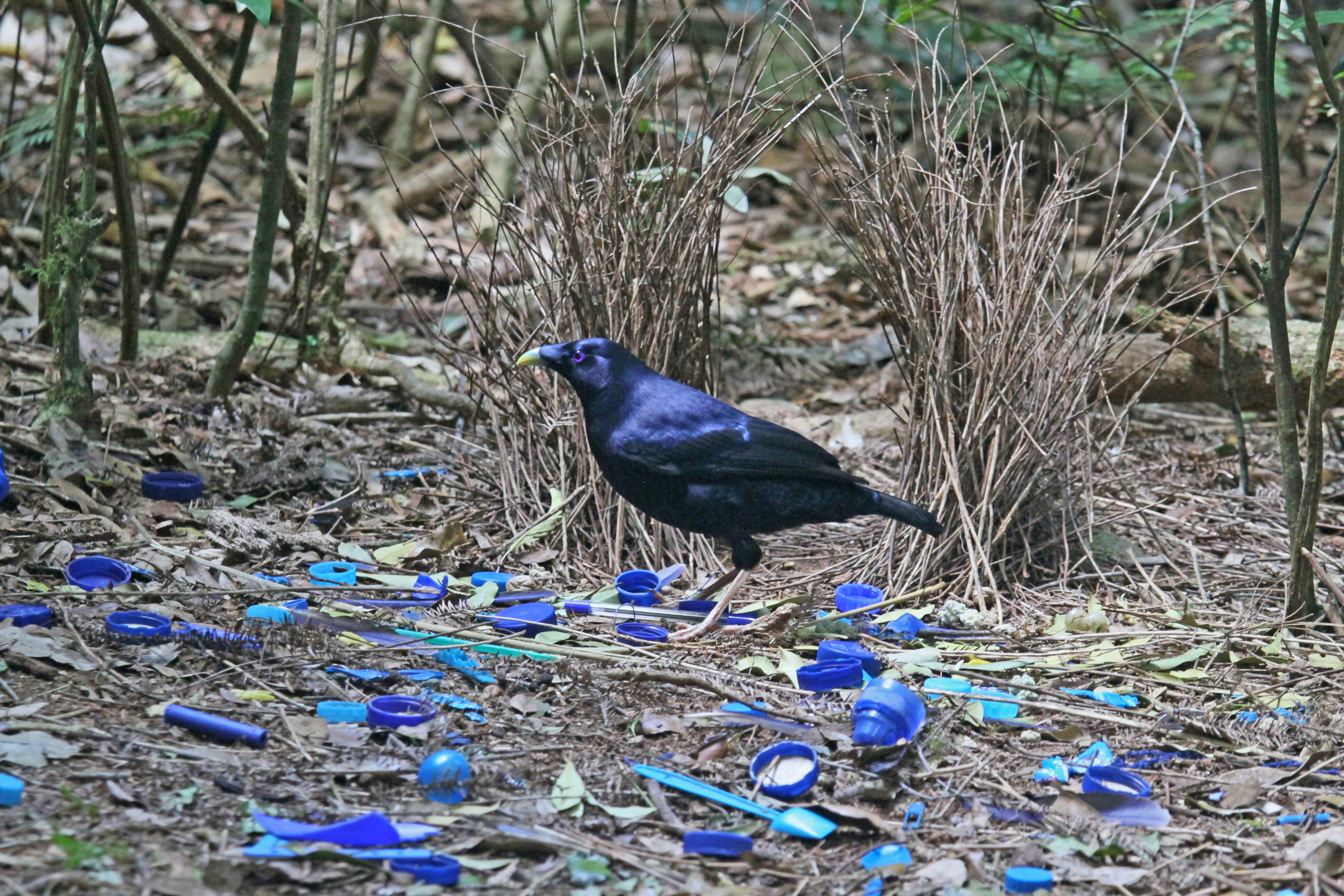
Satin bowerbird at his bower, decorated with blue bottle caps and other plastic items

Like all bowerbirds, the satin bowerbird shows highly complex courtship behaviour. Mate choice in satin bowerbirds has been studied in detail. Males build specialised stick structures, called bowers, which they decorate with blue, yellow, and shiny objects, including berries, flowers, snail shells, and plastic items such as ballpoint pens, drinking straws and clothes pegs. As the males mature they use more blue objects than other colours. It is theorized that the preference for blue objects is due to the colour accentuating the plumage of male satin bowerbirds or that the colour blue is more familiar and the designated colour for this species. Females visit these and choose which male they will allow to mate with them. In addition to building their bowers, males carry out intense behavioural displays called dances to woo their mates, but these can be treated as threat displays by the females. Nestbuilding and incubation are carried out by the females alone.

Recent research has shown that female mate choice takes place in three stages:

- Visits to the bowers, before nests have been built, while the males are absent
- Visits to the bowers, before nests have been built, while the males are present and displaying
- Visits to a selection of the bowers, after nests have been built, leading to copulation with (typically) a single male.

Experimental manipulations of the ornaments around the bowers have shown that the choices of young females (those in their first or second year of breeding) are mainly influenced by the appearance of the bowers, and hence by the first stage of this process. Older females, which are less affected by the threatening aspect of the males' displays, make their choices more on the basis of the males' dancing displays. It has been hypothesised that as males mature their colour discrimination develops and they are able to select more blue objects for the bower. It is not yet known whether this description would also hold true for other species of bowerbird.

Male satin bowerbirds are known to destroy and steal from the bowers of one another. The quality of a male's own bower does not predict how often they will destroy others. However, males who exhibit more aggression by attacking others at feeding sites tend to destroy competitor bowers more frequently.

== Nesting and life cycle ==
Satin bowerbirds nest between October and February. Typically two eggs but occasionally one or three are laid in a shallow nest of twigs on top of which are placed leaves of Eucalyptus or Acacia. These leaves turn brown as the eggs are laid, and may serve as camouflage. The eggs are cream but streaked with brown, and are much larger than typical for a bird of its size at around 19 grams (0.67 oz); they are laid every other day and hatch asynchronously after 21 days of incubation.

The young are able to fly three weeks after hatching, but remain dependent on the female for another two months, finally dispersing at the beginning of the southern winter (May or June).

Female satin bowerbirds mature at two to three years but males do not reach maturity until seven or eight years when they have moulted completely into their characteristic blue-black adult plumage. The satin bowerbird is the longest-lived passerine with anything approaching high-quality banding data: it is estimated that the average lifespan of the species is around eight or nine years, while the record longevity in the wild of twenty-six years is the greatest for any banded passerine.

== Gallery ==
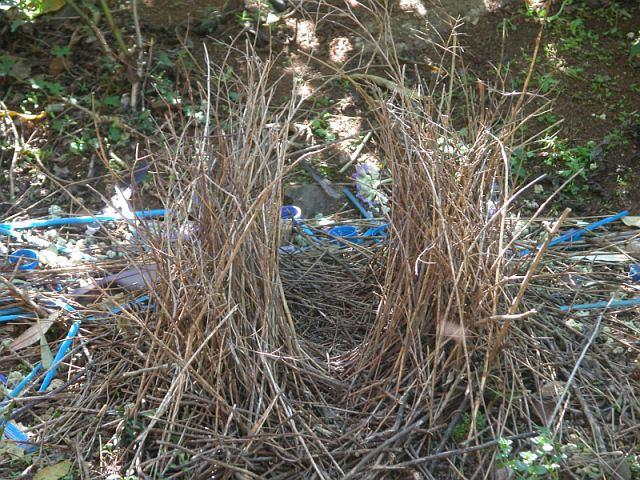
Bower

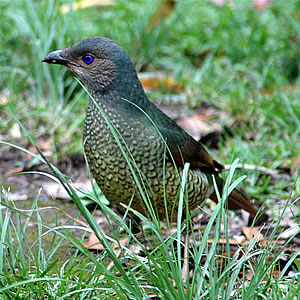
Female

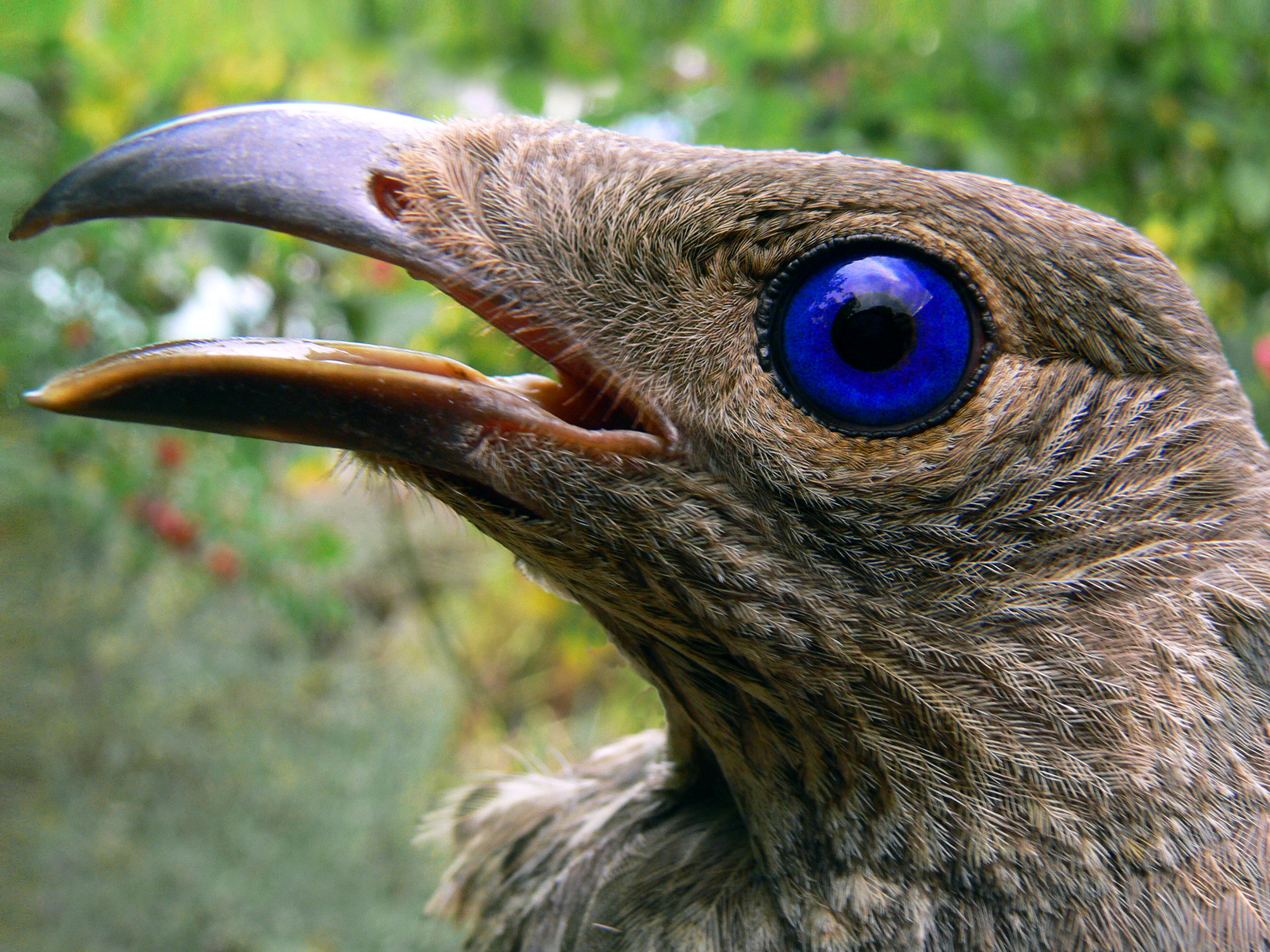
Female

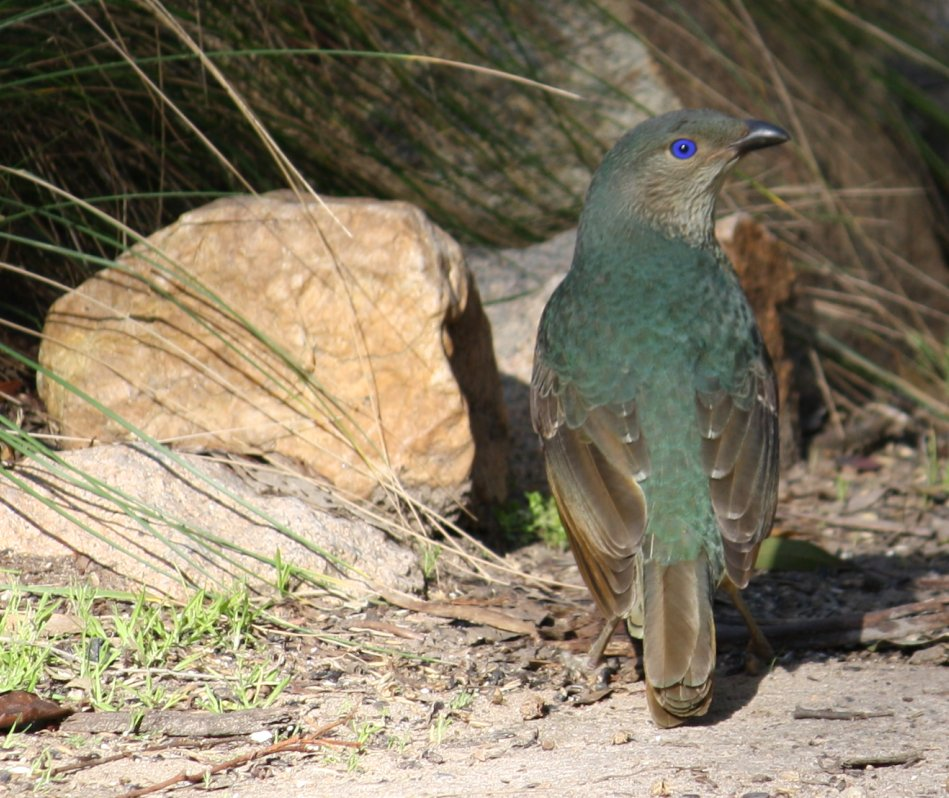
Female

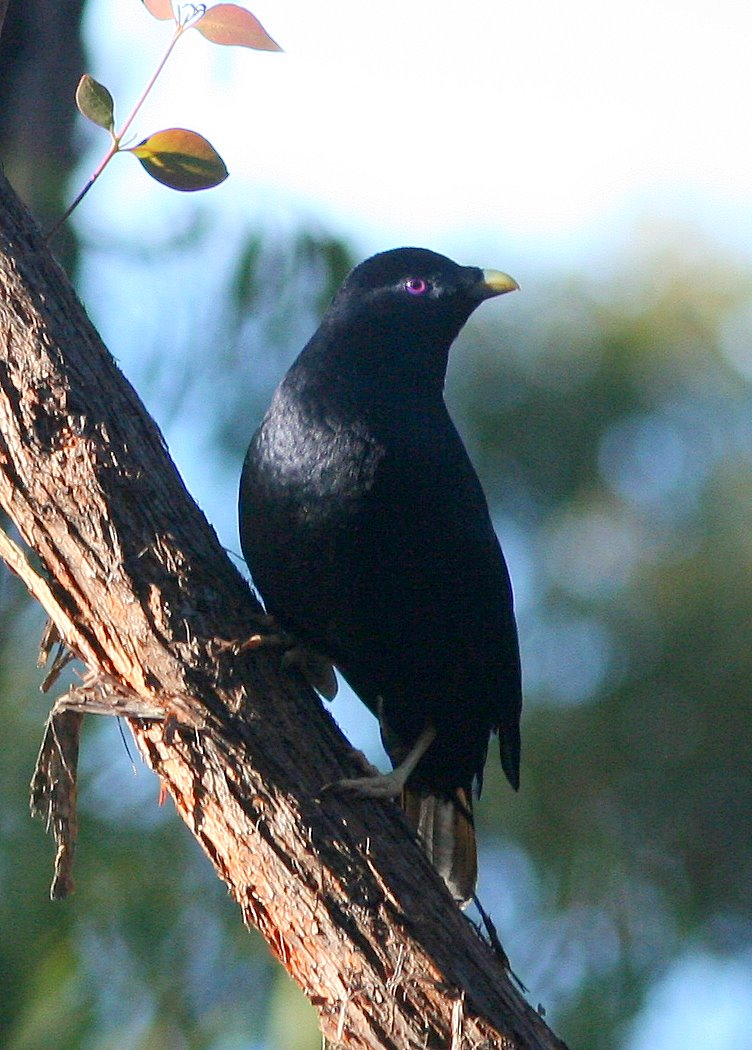
Male

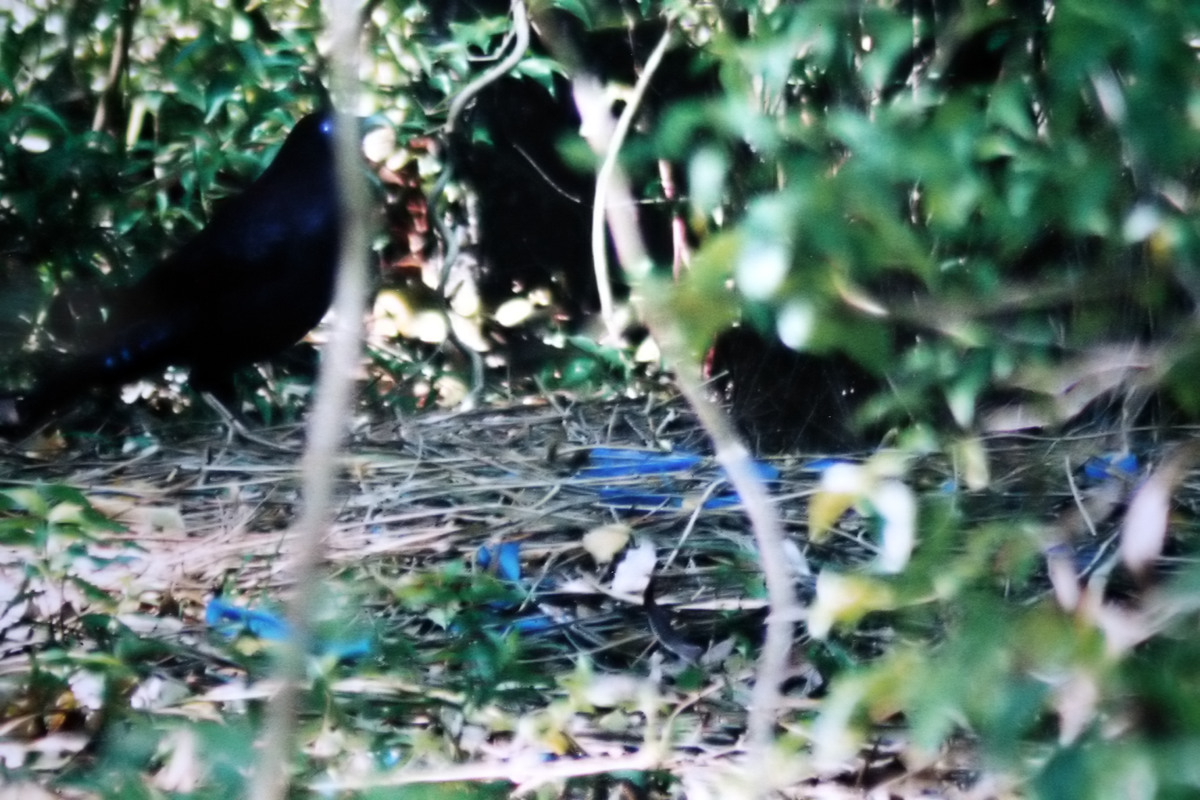
A male and his bower

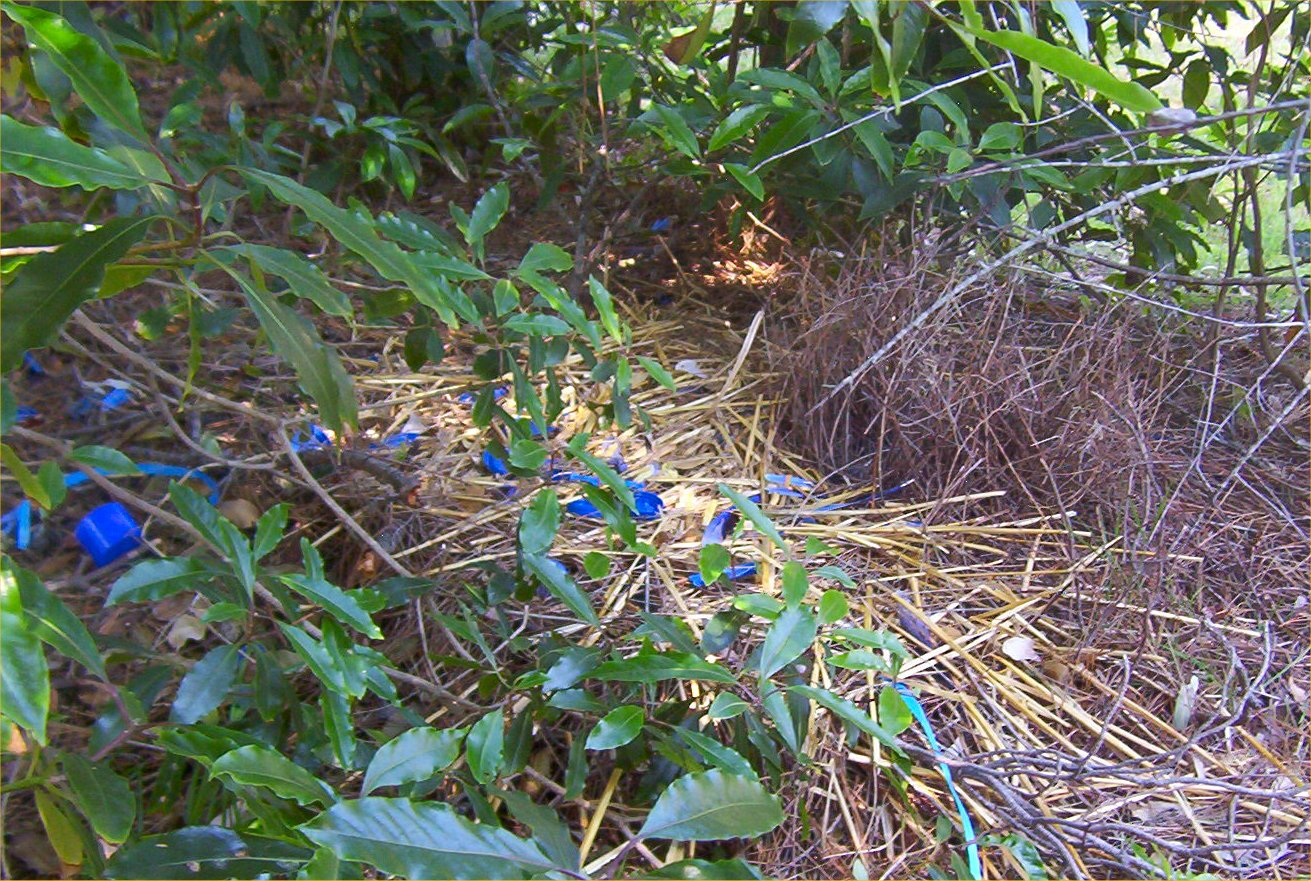
A range of plastic artifacts in a bower

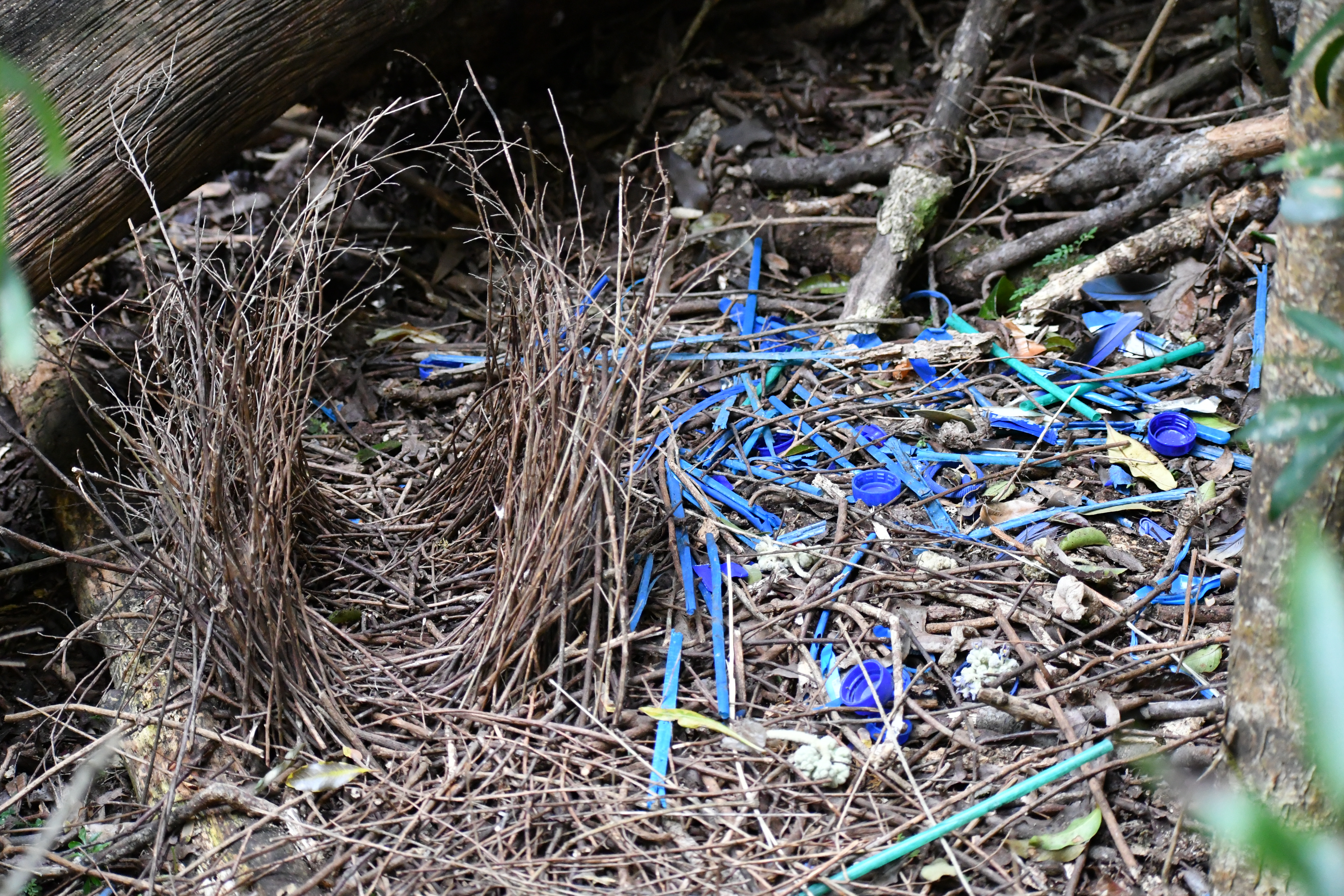
Bower
