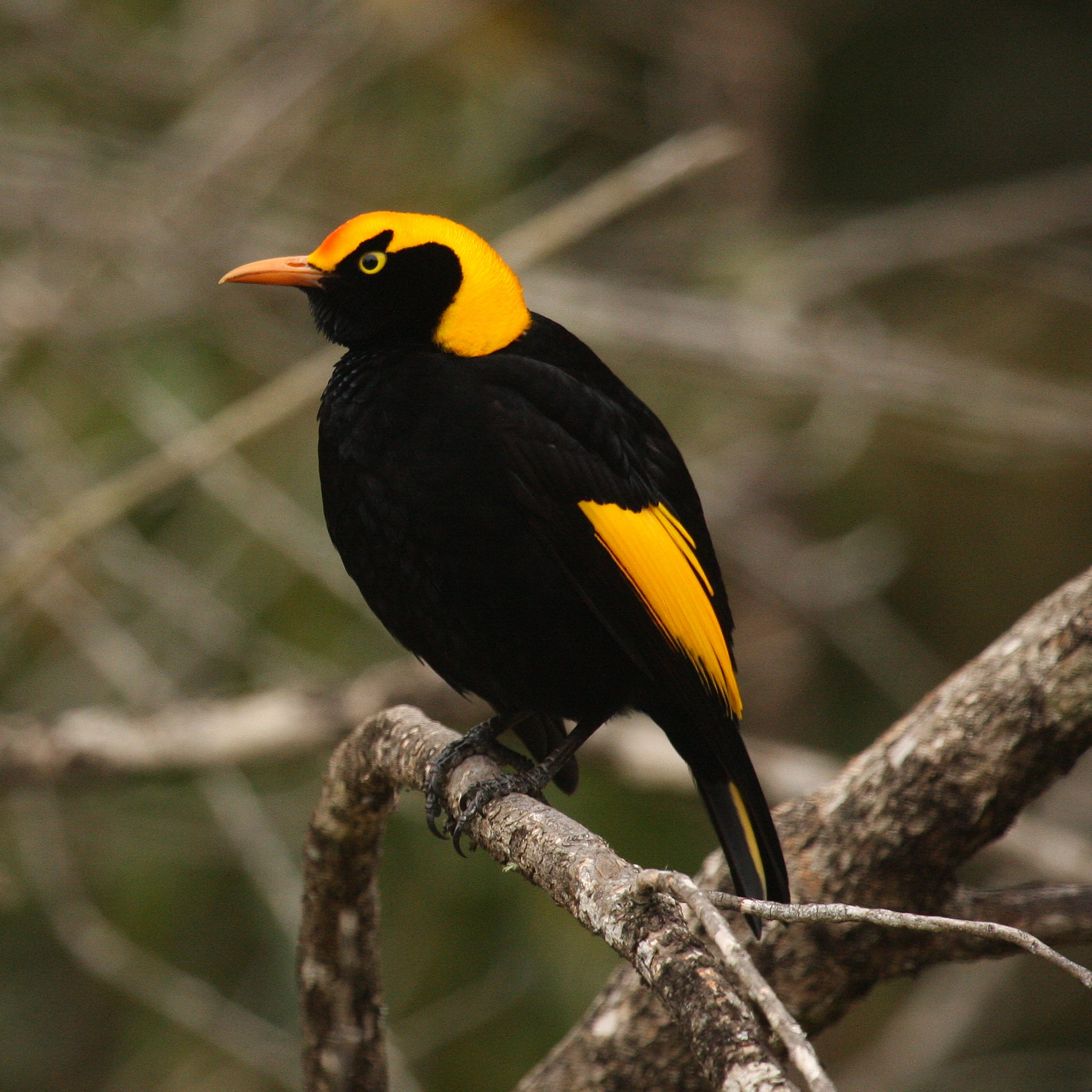
- Male in Queensland, Australia
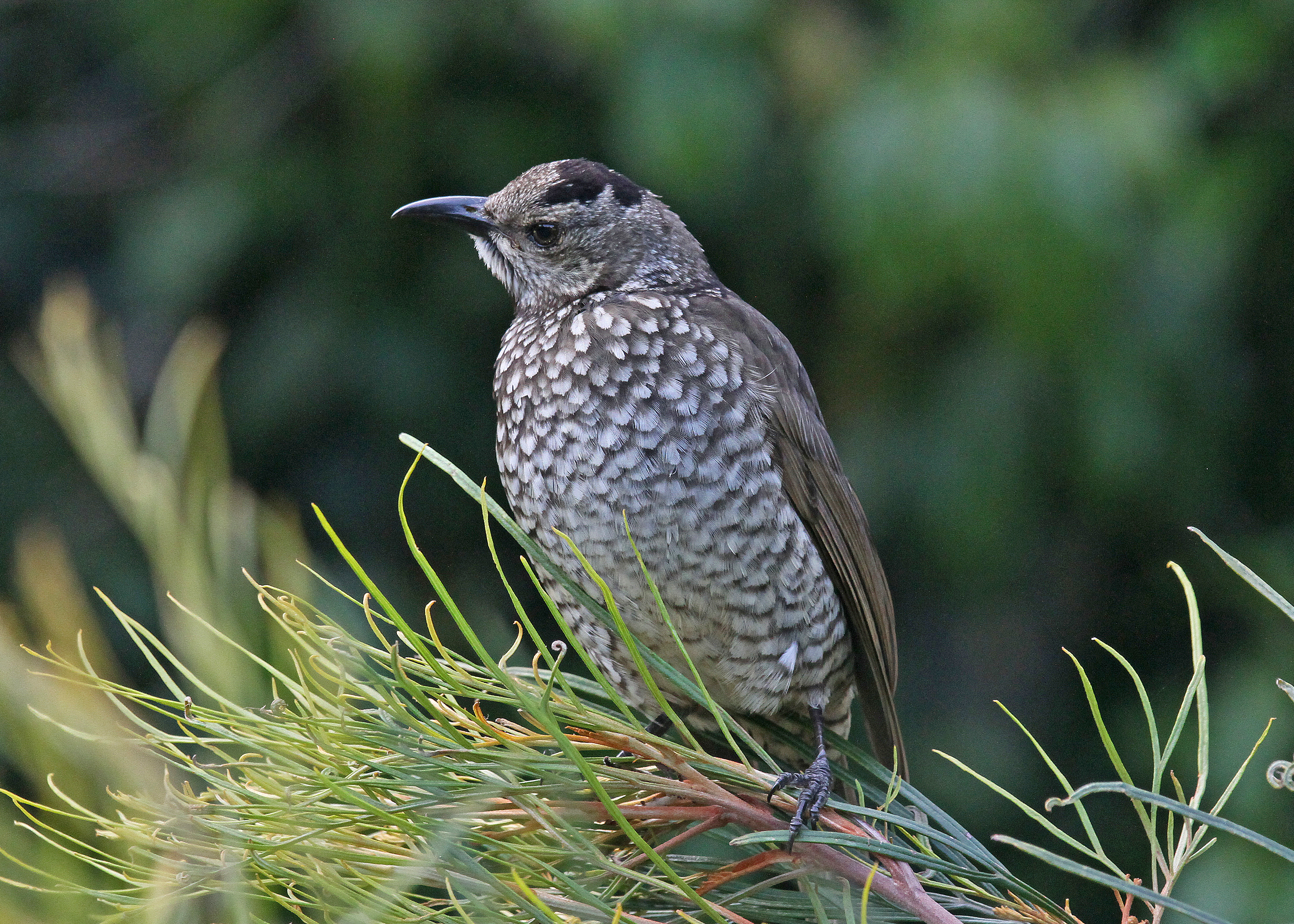
- Female in Lamington National Park

Conservation status
- Least Concern (IUCN 3.1)

Scientific classification
- Kingdom: Animalia
- Phylum: Chordata
- Class: Aves
- Order: Passeriformes
- Family: Ptilonorhynchidae
- Genus: Sericulus
- Species: S. chrysocephalus

Binomial name
- Sericulus chrysocephalus (Lewin, 1808)
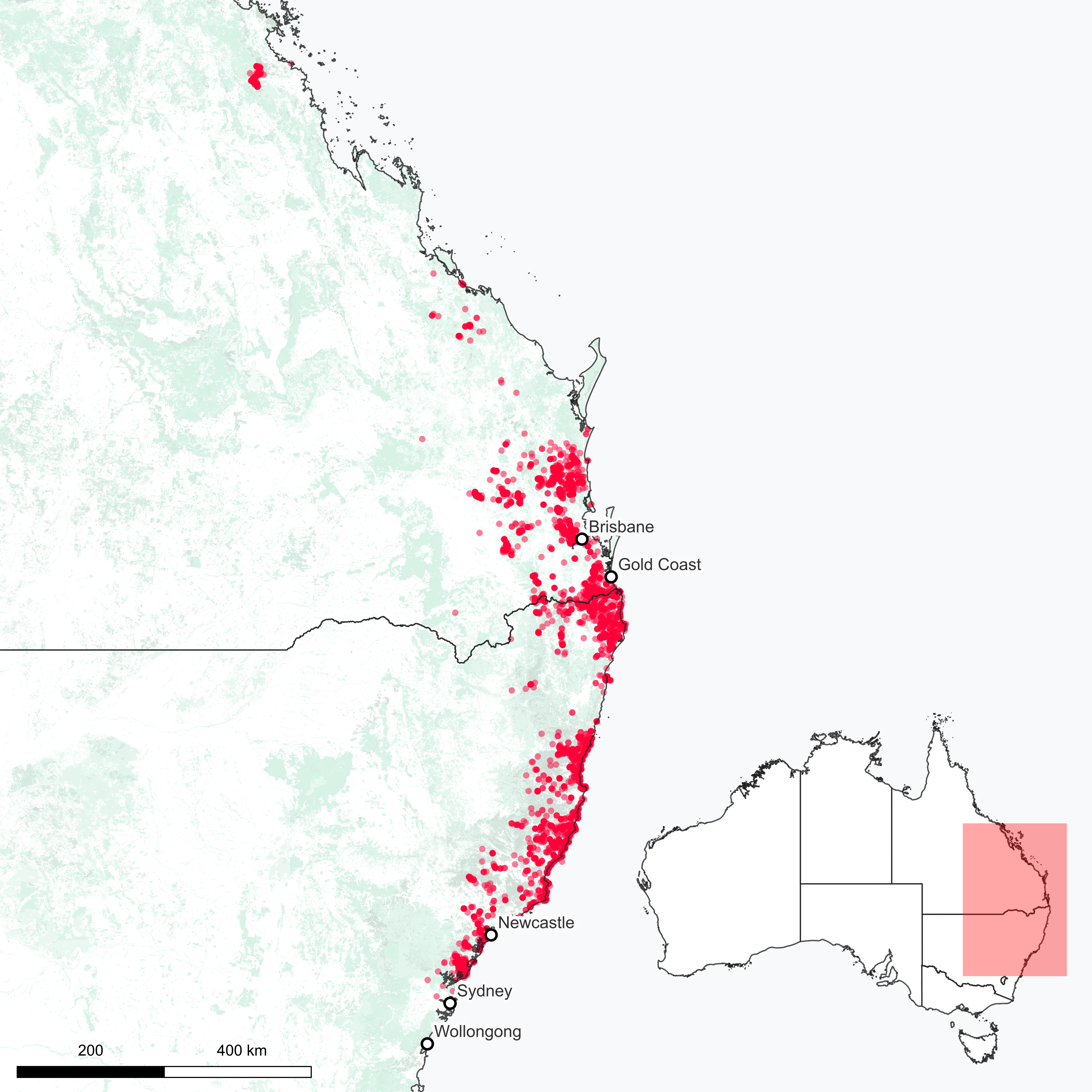
- Species distribution

= Regent bowerbird =

Species of bird

The regent bowerbird (Sericulus chrysocephalus) is a medium-sized, up to 25 cm long, sexually dimorphic bowerbird. The male bird is black with a golden orange-yellow crown, mantle and black-tipped wing feathers. It has yellow bill, black feet and yellow iris. The female is a brown bird with whitish or fawn markings, grey bill, black feet and crown. The name commemorates a prince regent of the United Kingdom.

== Diet ==
The diet consists mainly of fruits, berries and insects.

== Behaviour ==
All male bowerbirds build bowers, which can be simple ground clearings or elaborate structures, to attract female mates. Regent bowerbirds in particular are known to mix a muddy greyish blue or pea green "saliva paint" in their mouths which they use to decorate their bowers. The male builds an avenue-type bower consisting of two walls of sticks, decorated with shells, seeds, leaves and berries. Regents will sometimes use wads of greenish leaves as "paintbrushes" to help spread the substance, representing one of the few known instances of tools used by birds. The female builds a saucer-shaped nest made of twigs measuring 30 cm high and 15–20 cm wide often away from the bower.

== Habitat ==
An Australian endemic, the regent bowerbird is distributed to rainforests and margins of eastern Australia, from central Queensland to New South Wales.

A rare natural intergeneric hybrid between the regent bowerbird and the satin bowerbird is known as Rawnsley's bowerbird.

== Conservation status ==
A common species throughout its range, the regent bowerbird is evaluated as "least concern" on the IUCN Red List of Threatened Species.

== Breeding ==
The male regent bowerbird builds a bower and will mate with several female bowerbirds. The male bird doesn't raise the young, and the female bird builds the nest.

== Gallery ==
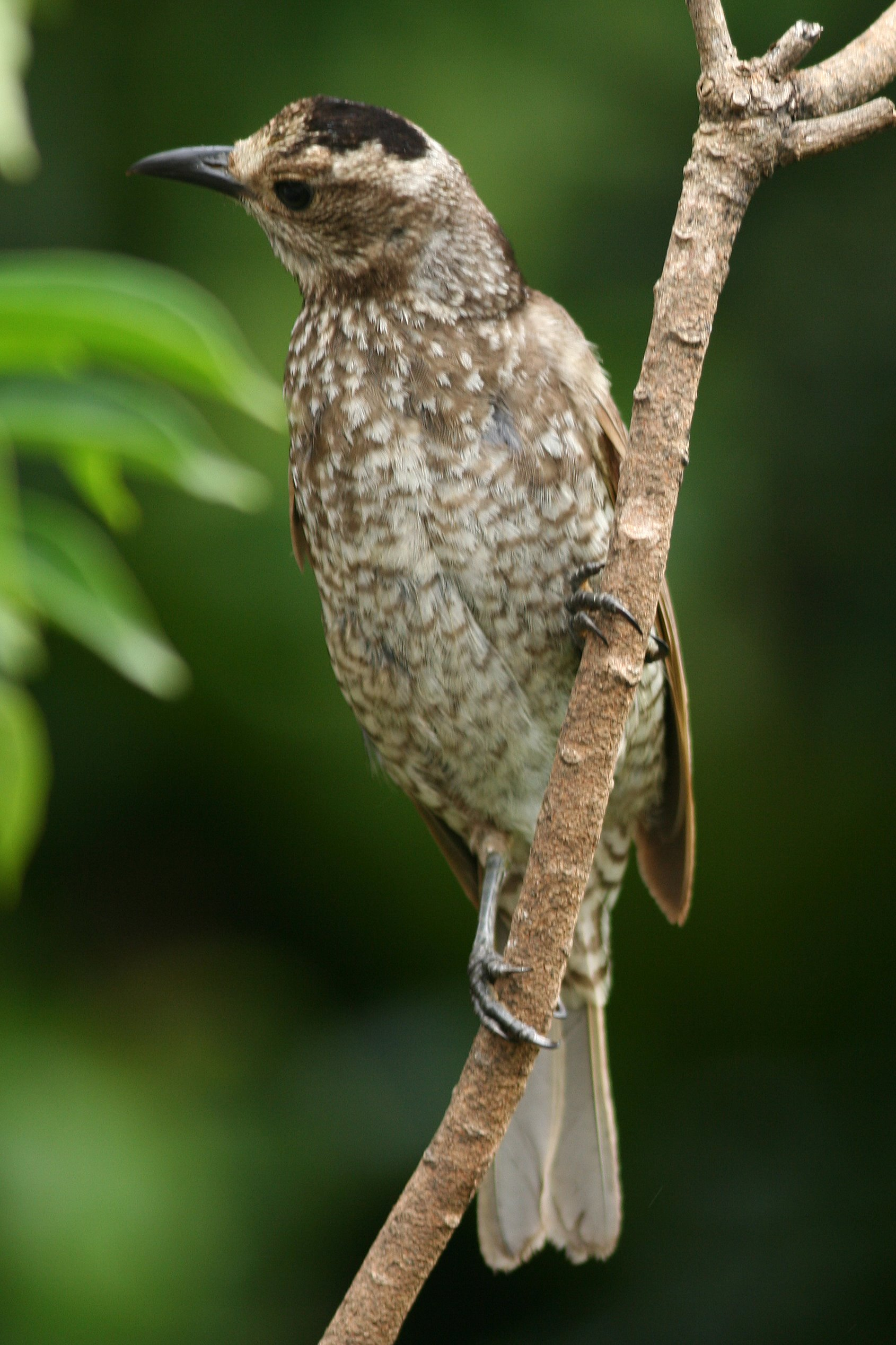
Female

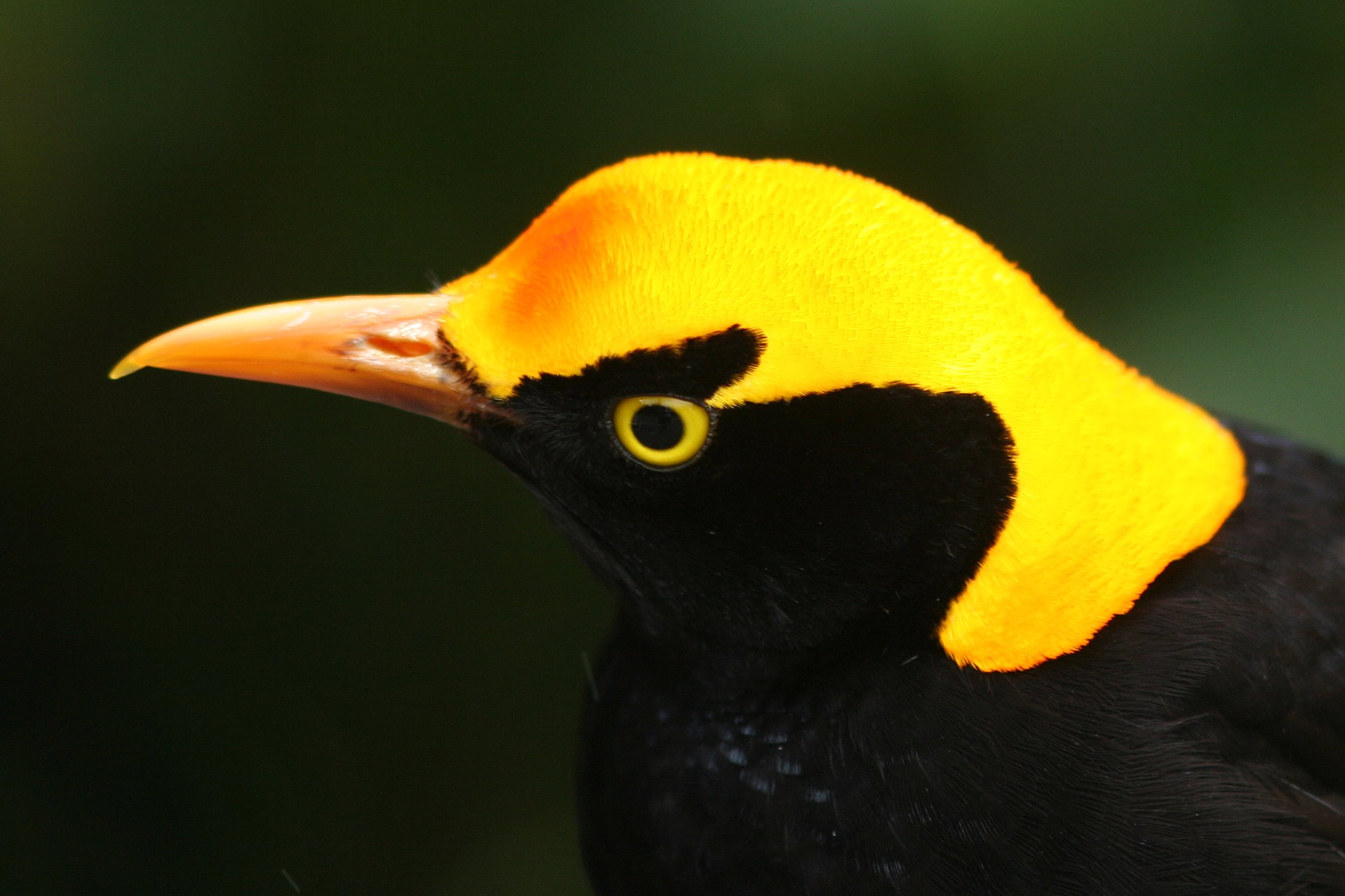
Male

Male in Queensland

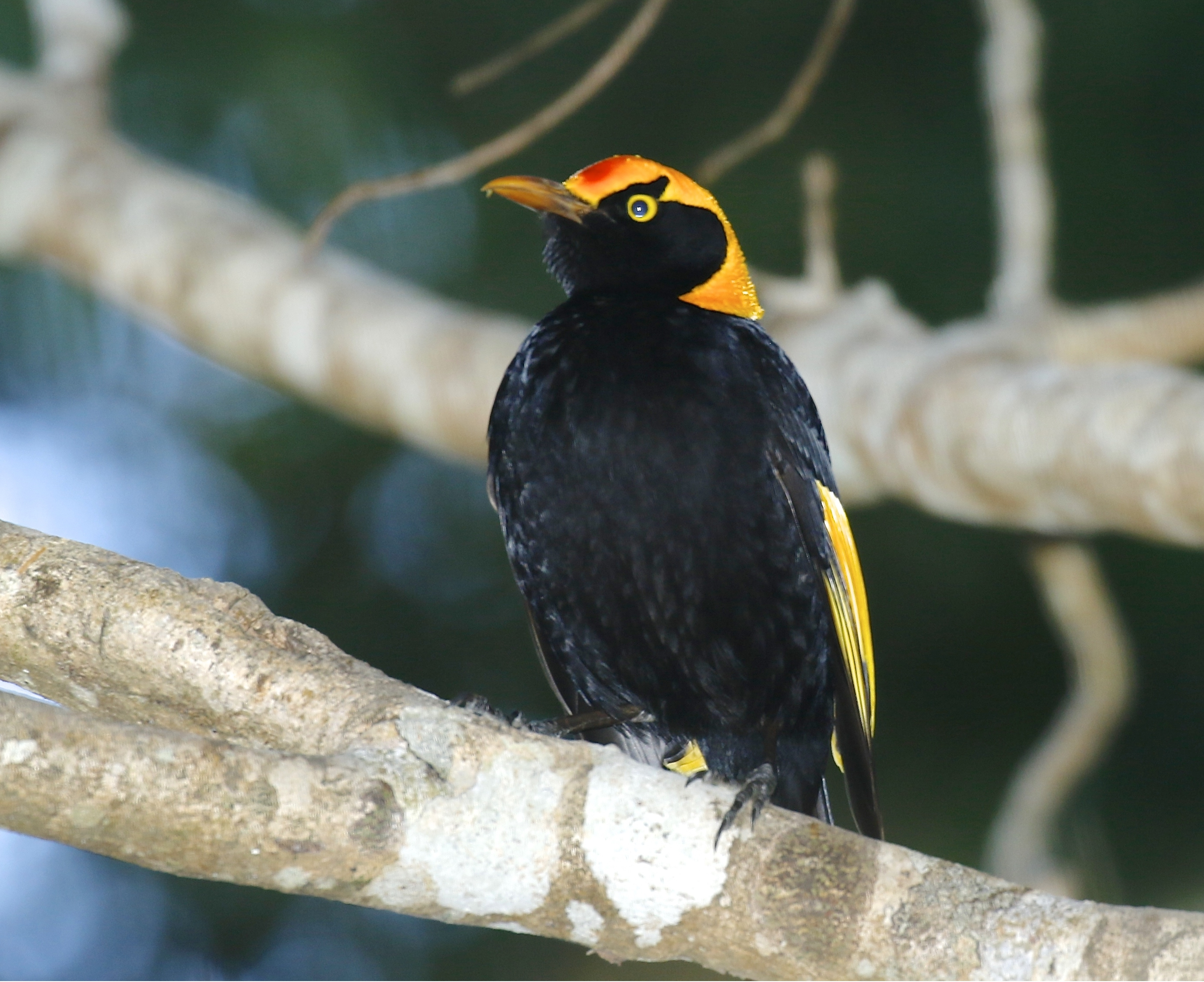
Laminington Nat'l Park - Australia.

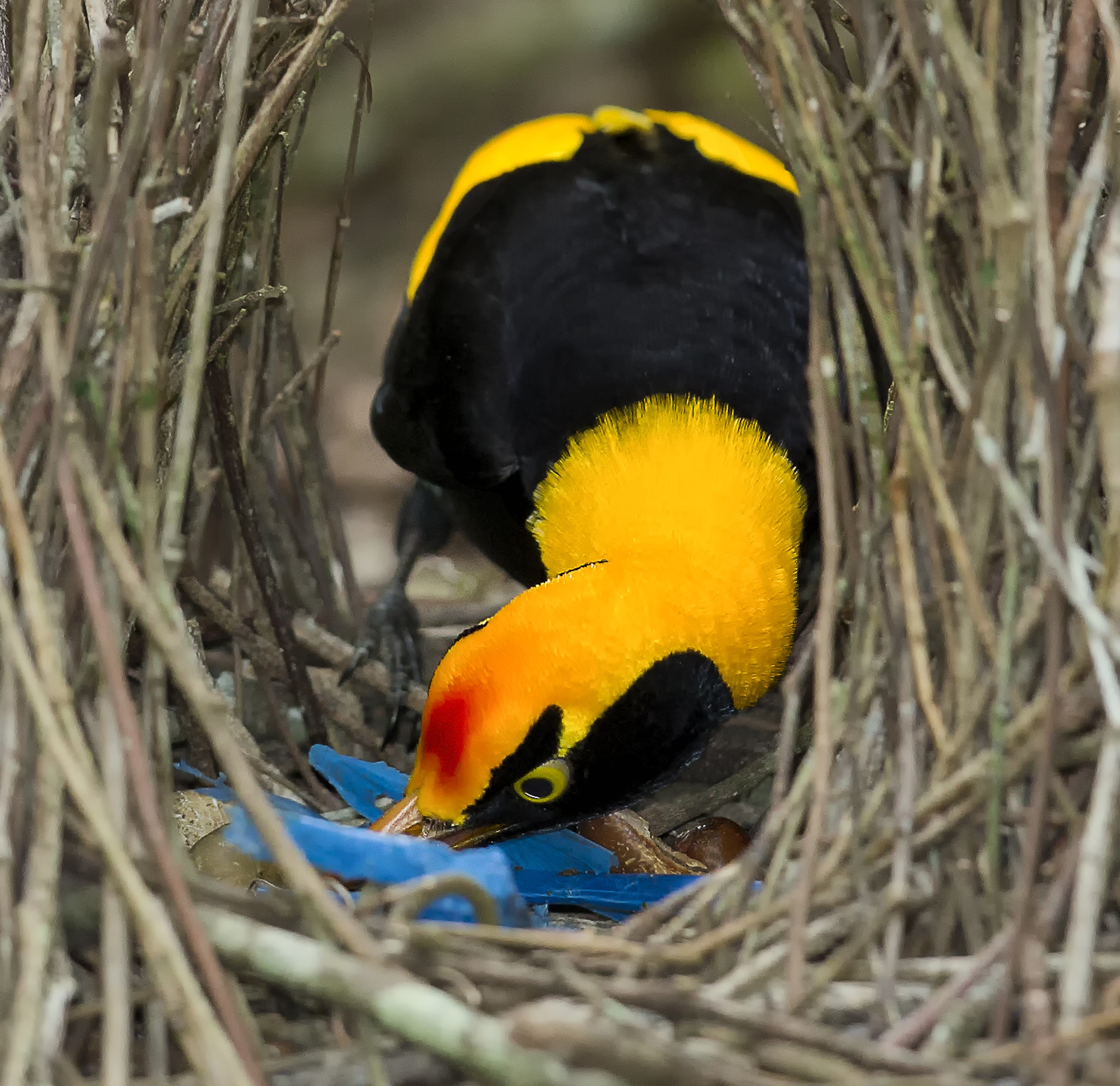
Regent bowerbird arranging bower items
