= The Ornithology of Australia =

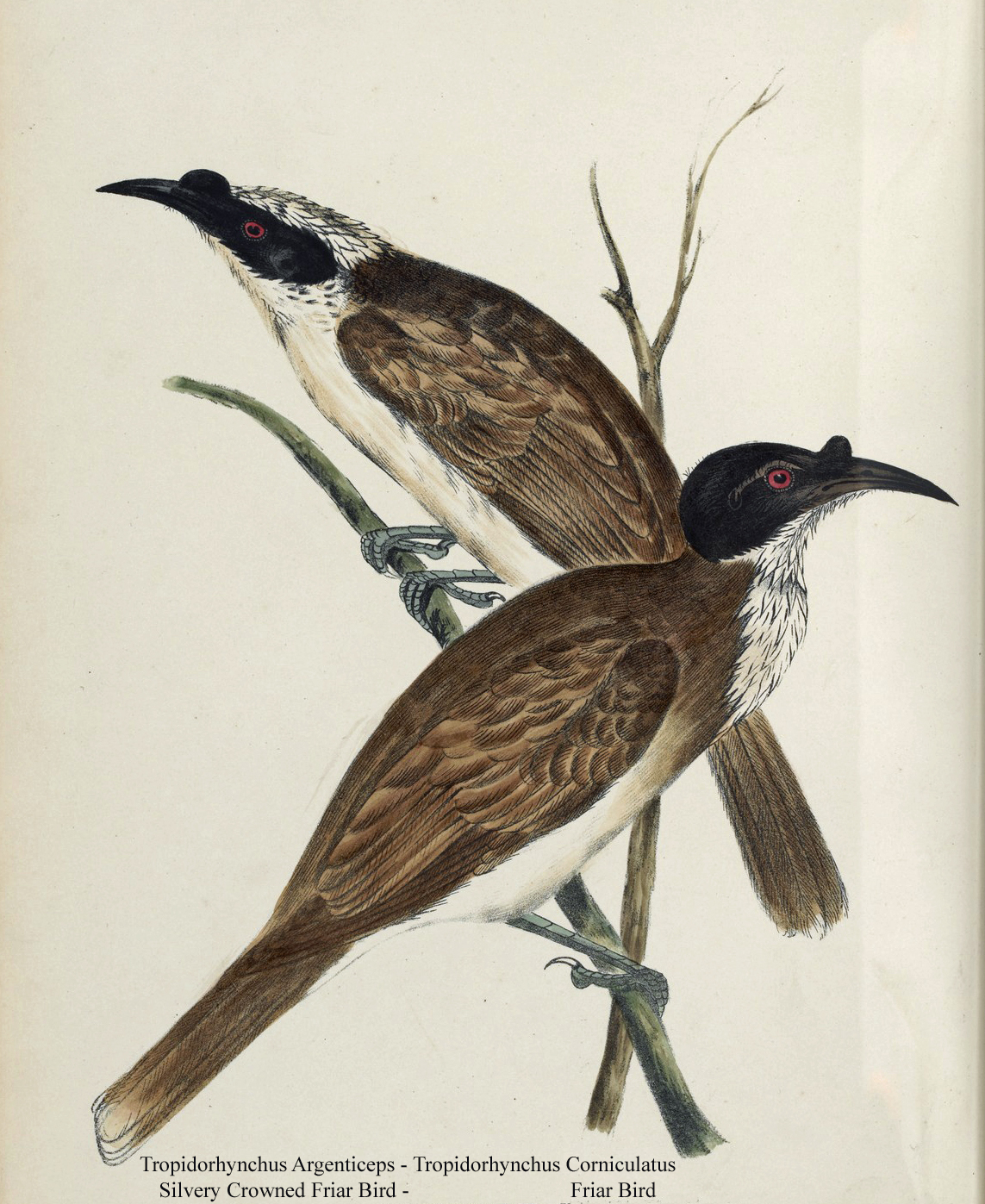
- Plate from "Companion to Gould's Handbook" by Silvester Diggles
- Author: Silvester Diggles
- Illustrator: Silvester Diggles and Rowena Birkett
- Language: English
- Subject: Birds of Australia
- Genre: Fine illustrated books
- Publication date: 1865–1870
- Publication place: Australia
- Media type: Print with hand-coloured lithographic plates

The Ornithology of Australia comprises three volumes (of an uncompleted set) of lithographed, hand-coloured, illustrations of Australian birds with accompanying text. It was authored by Silvester Diggles of Brisbane and was originally issued in 21 parts, each part containing six plates (126 plates in all) with short descriptive letterpress, in imperial quarto format, with the leaves of the plates 39 cm in height. The parts were printed for the author by T.P. Pugh. Altogether, between 1863 and 1875, Diggles, with his niece Rowena Birkett who hand-coloured each plate, produced 325 plates illustrating some 600 Australian birds.

In 1877 Diggles produced what was essentially a two-volume second edition of the previously published work, using 123 of the same plates and renamed Companion to Gould's Handbook, or, Synopsis of the birds of Australia, containing nearly one-third of the whole, or about 220 examples, for the most part from the original drawings, though the spine title was simply Diggles' Ornithology. Volume 1 had 59 plates, volume 2 had 64, printed by Thorne & Greenwell of Brisbane. The title referred to John Gould's 1865 book Handbook to the Birds of Australia.

Diggles lacked the funds to continue publishing the series of lithographs. From 1875 his health began to deteriorate, and he died in 1880. His manuscript and original plates, including those unpublished, were later acquired from Diggles’ son by publishing firm Angus & Robertson which presented them to the Mitchell Library in Sydney. In August 1990 a facsimile edition of The Ornithology of Australia, volume 1, parts 1–7, was published by State Publishing South Australia (ISBN 0-7243-6556-7).

== Sources ==
- Marks, E. N. (1972). "Diggles, Silvester (1817–1880)". Australian Dictionary of Biography. National Centre of Biography, Australian National University. ISBN 978-0-522-84459-7. ISSN 1833-7538. OCLC 70677943.
- Whittell, Hubert Massey (1954). The Literature of Australian Birds: A History and a Bibliography of Australian Ornithology (PDF). Perth: Paterson Brokensha. LCCN 56000760. OCLC 2851290. OL 6194318M. Wikidata Q7747557.
- Diggles, Silvester (1866). The Ornithology of Australia. T.P. Pugh – via National Library of Australia.
