= Silvester Diggles =

19th-century Australian polymath

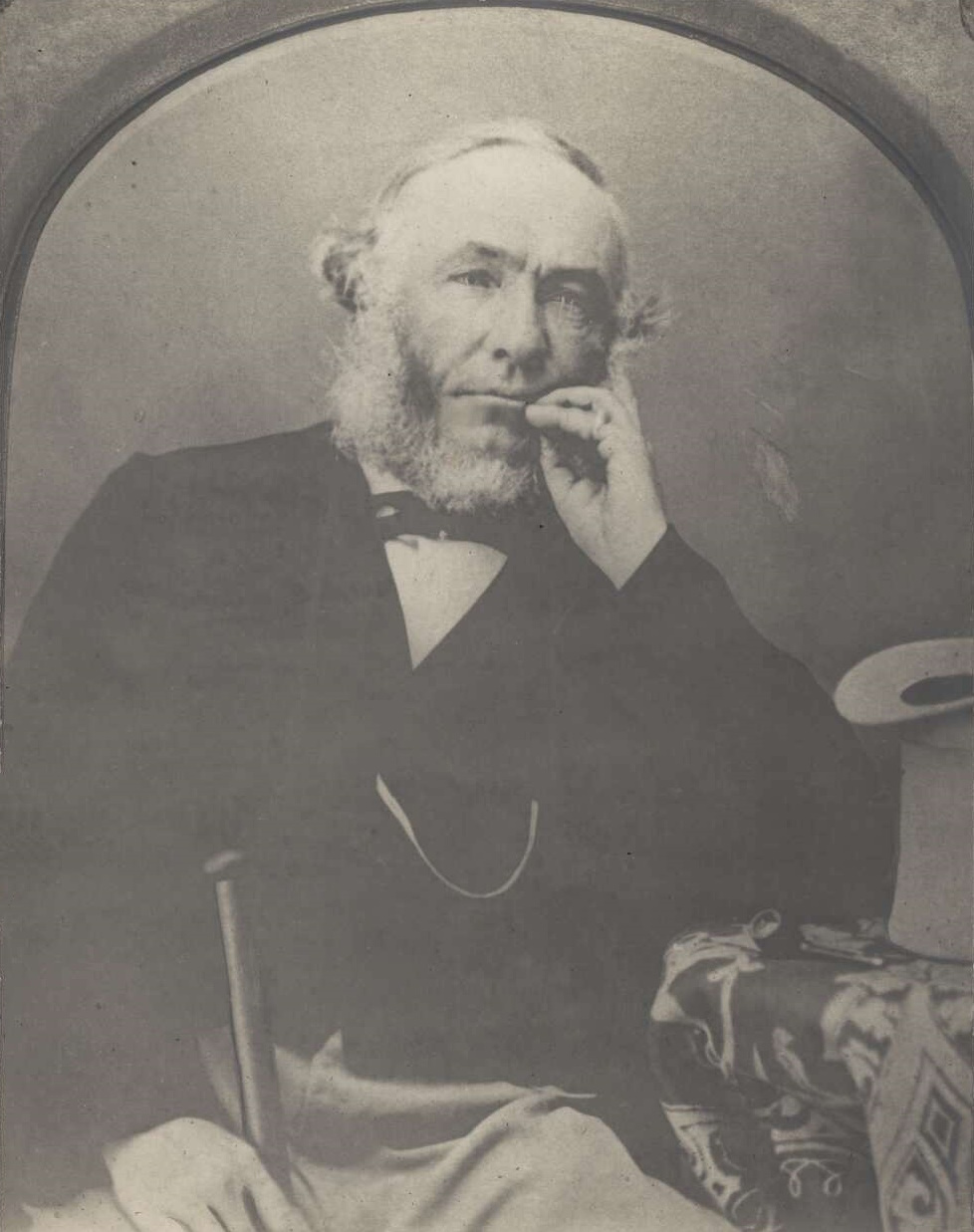
- Portrait of Silvester Diggles, Australia, c. 1875
- Born: Silvester Diggles; 24 January 1817; Liverpool, Lancashire, England
- Died: 21 March 1880 (aged 63); Kangaroo Point, Brisbane, Australia
- Occupations: Artist; musician; amateur ornithologist; entomologist
- Spouses: Eliza Bradley (m. 1839; died 1857); Albina Birkett (m. 1858)

Silvester Diggles (24 January 1817 – 21 March 1880) was a British-born Australian artist and musician, as well as being a noted amateur ornithologist and entomologist. His locally-produced publishing ventures to describe and illustrate the birds of Australia are a testament to his skills and tenacity as an artist and naturalist.

== Biography ==
=== Early life ===
Silvester Diggles was born on 24 January 1817 at Liverpool in Merseyside, the eldest son of Edward Holt Diggles and Elizabeth (née Silvester). His father was an ironmonger. The family lived for several years at Stone in Staffordshire in the early 1820s but had returned to Liverpool by the mid-1820s.

Silvester's father died in 1831 leaving his widow with the ironmongery and six surviving children aged from five to fourteen.

=== Merseyside ===
By 1837 Diggles' mother was running a boarding-house near Toxteth Park, south of the Liverpool city centre.

In May 1839, Diggles and Eliza Bradley were married in St. Michael-in-the-Hamlet church. Eliza's father, John Bradley, was a private tutor of the classics and natural philosophy. Silvester and Eliza Diggles lived at Birkenhead, on the west bank of the River Mersey, and had two daughters and a son, born from 1840 to 1845.

Diggles made his living as a painter of miniatures and a piano tuner. From 1845 he was listed in directories as a "teacher of music and drawing" and from 1851 as an "organist". He was a religious man and joined the New Jerusalem Church in 1846.

=== Sydney ===
By 1853 Diggles had decided to emigrate to Australia. In early June he and his family departed from Liverpool aboard the small barque Willem Ernst. The vessel carried only twelve passengers, two families and a married lady. The Willem Ernst arrived at Sydney on 11 November 1853.

In Sydney, Diggles worked as a piano tuner for W. J. Johnson and Co., with business premises in Pitt Street selling pianofortes and harmoniums, as well well as sheet music and providing services for the tuning and repair of instruments.

In November 1854, Diggles visited Brisbane on business, travelling there aboard the steamer Boomerang, and afterwards made the decision to return there to live.

=== Brisbane ===
Diggles and his family arrived at Brisbane on 29 January 1855 aboard the schooner Souvenir. Soon afterwards Diggles placed an advertisement in The Moreton Bay Courier announcing his arrival in Brisbane and advertising the services "of teaching the piano forte, singing and drawing, in a variety of styles". His services included the tuning and regulating of pianofortes and miniature portraiture.

Diggles' wife Eliza died on 18 August 1857 after "long and painful" illness.

Silvester Diggles and Albina Birkett were married at Kangaroo Point on 26 January 1858. The couple had two sons, born in 1859 and 1862.

Diggles was well known in Brisbane; he was a founder of the Brisbane Choral Society in 1859 and the Brisbane Philharmonic Society in 1861, and was a familiar accompanist at concerts and church services. He served as the New Jerusalem Church's leader in Brisbane. He was also a Freemason.

Diggles was an early and respected member of the Queensland Philosophical Society which was formed in March 1859, a scientific institution anticipating the new colony established the following month. In the following years he published a number of papers in the Philosophical Society's Transactions and for many years he acted as honorary curator of the Society's small museum, established in January 1862 in the old windmill observatory on Wickham Terrace. By 1864 the collection at the windmill was being referred to as the Queensland Museum. (Note: After various subsequent changes of location the Queensland Museum found a permanent home within the Queensland Cultural Centre in the South Bank precinct on the Brisbane River.)

As a pioneering Australian naturalist Diggles observed, identified, classified and described species old and new. To develop local interest in natural history he gave public lectures, wrote scientific papers and wrote articles published in newspapers. Diggles exchanged information and specimens with collectors in the Australian colonies, as well as the United States and England. During the 1870s Diggles produced illustrations of over 125 species of beetle as a personal supplement to the Catalogue of the Described Coleoptera of Australia, compiled by George Masters. He also had an interest in astronomy. He owned a telescope and a collection of books on the subject and frequently assisted his colleague Captain Henry O'Reilly at his Hill End observatory.

=== The Ornithology of Australia ===
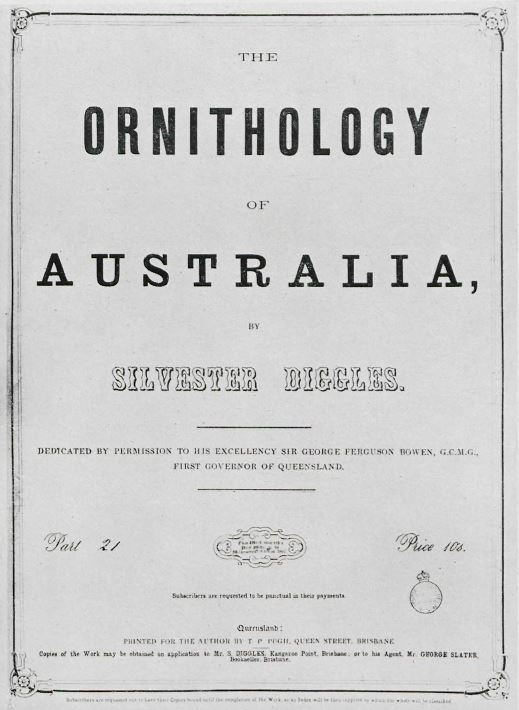
The cover of Silvester Diggles' The Ornithology of Australia (part 21), published in about 1870.

Diggles was a naturalist with a special interest in ornithology and entomology. By the mid-1860s he had judged that there was a need for accessible and reliable natural history information and undertook to produce a comprehensive and affordable work on Australian birds. At that time the only available publication on Australian birds was John Gould's expensive and inaccessible seven-volume The Birds of Australia, published in London in the 1840s.

In July 1865 Diggles issued a prospectus seeking subscribers for his publishing venture to be titled The Ornithology of Australia. In comparison to Gould's publication (which was described as "difficult to procure", with a price "far beyond the means of any but the most wealthy"), Diggles proposed to produce "an accurate and useful book of reference, at as low a cost as will allow of its being published in a credible manner". His work was to be issued in sections (or fascicles) at a cost of ten shillings, equivalent to A$68.79 in 2022, for each section, with the number of parts expected to "not much exceed forty".

The first instalment of The Ornithology of Australia was published in November 1865. A writer for the Queensland Daily Guardian declared that Diggles "is entitled to the warmest praise for his spirited enterprise", adding: "The first part of this volume is now before us, and we cannot but express our sincere admiration of the excellence which marks the execution of the coloured lithographs, and indeed every detail".

However, Diggles's timing was unfortunate. In 1866, Australia suffered a major financial crisis and his subscribers declined abruptly from 100 to 60. He managed to issue twenty-one parts from 1865 to 1870. Each part included six lithographed and hand-coloured plates (quarto size), with each illustration accompanied by a page of descriptive text. The twenty-one parts comprised 126 plates which included images of 244 species, all painted by Diggles himself. However, his output by 1870 had only covered about one third of the known Australian birds, at which stage Diggles had been forced to discontinue the publication from lack of funds.

In 1871 the New South Wales government astronomer Henry Russell and his counterpart in Victoria, Robert Ellery, organised a scientific expedition to Cape Sidmouth in Far North Queensland for the primary purpose of observing a total eclipse of the sun. Diggles was selected to be a part of the eclipse expedition, representing Queensland and recommended for his skills as an artist and naturalist. The expedition travelled to islands off far north Queensland aboard the steamer Governor Blackall in December 1871.

In 1872 Diggles' niece Rowena Birkett, aged twelve, went to live with her aunt and uncle at Kangaroo Point. Diggles privately tutored his young niece in both art and music after she came to live in the household.

By 1875, at a time when his health was beginning to deteriorate, Diggles reluctantly accepted that his Ornithology of Australia project would never be completed. Rather than continue with the project, he produced his lithographic illustrations under a new title, Companion to Gould's Handbook: or, Synopsis of the Birds of Australia, which was published in two volumes in 1877. The title referred to John Gould's Handbook to the Birds of Australia, published in two volumes in London in 1865 (without illustrations). The drawings on stone for the Companion to Gould's Handbook were mainly Diggles' work, with additional lithographic drawings done by Henry G. Eaton (mostly "faithful copies" of Diggles' original drawings). When the Companion to Gould's Handbook went on sale in mid-1877 it was offered in two versions. The two volumes of the "coloured by hand" version cost twenty-five pounds, equivalent to A$3,932 in 2022, whereas the two uncoloured volumes sold for seven pounds and ten shillings, equivalent to A$1,179.55 in 2022. Rowena Birkett probably assisted her uncle by hand-colouring many of the printed copies for this publication, using Diggles' watercolour originals as a guide.

=== Last years ===
In 1877 Diggles suffered a stroke and was left with "lingering paralysis". In August 1877 it was announced that a complimentary benefit concert was "to be given to that old musical stager, Mr. Diggles". It was reported that the benefit "is much needed" as Diggles' "health has entirely broken down, and he can no longer earn his daily bread". The concert was held on the evening of 12 September 1877 in the School of Arts building before "a large and fashionable audience". A report of the concert commented that Diggles "may truly be termed the 'father of music' in Brisbane", who "must feel some great degree of comfort from the practical evidences of sympathy and substantial aid rendered to him on the occasion, for the gratuitous services of all the performers and the generous support of the Brisbane public prove... the appreciation in which the man and his labors are held here". The benefit concert raised an amount of nearly £116, equivalent to A$18,244 in 2022, which was handed directly to Diggles.

Due to his infirmity, Diggles' niece Rowena Birkett became more directly involved in his next project, Australian Insects and Their Transformations, which her uncle had commenced in 1871. By 1878 twenty-six transformations had been completed, of which sixteen were signed and dated by Rowena in the last two years. (Note: Australian Insects and Their Transformations remained incomplete and unpublished and Rowena retained the whole series of drawings after the death of her uncle in 1880.)

In 1879 Rowena Birkett left Brisbane to take up a position as a governess.

Silvester Diggles died on 21 March 1880 at his home in Kangaroo Point, aged 64, survived by his widow, two daughters of his first marriage and two sons of the second. He was buried in Toowong Cemetery.

== Legacy ==
Among the species that bear Diggles' name are the butterfly Hypochrysops digglesii, the rare chafer beetle Tapeionschema digglesii and the moth genus Digglesia (which A.J. Turner bestowed on him in 1911 noting: "After the late Mr. Diggles, the pioneer entomologist of Queensland"). The moth genus of Digglesia, the brushed trapdoor spider Ozicrypta digglesi, and the sea snail Zafra digglesi are named after him.

The original manuscript of The Ornithology of Australia, made up of four albums containing approximately 245 plates of watercolour drawings, are digitised and held by the State Library of New South Wales.

== Publications ==
- Silvester Diggles (1865-1870), The Ornithology of Australia, parts 1 to 21, printed for the author by T. P. Pugh of Brisbane.
- Silvester Diggles (1877), Companion to Gould's Handbook: or, Synopsis of the Birds of Australia, two volumes, Brisbane: Thorne & Greenwell.

== Gallery ==
A selection of images by Silvester Diggles
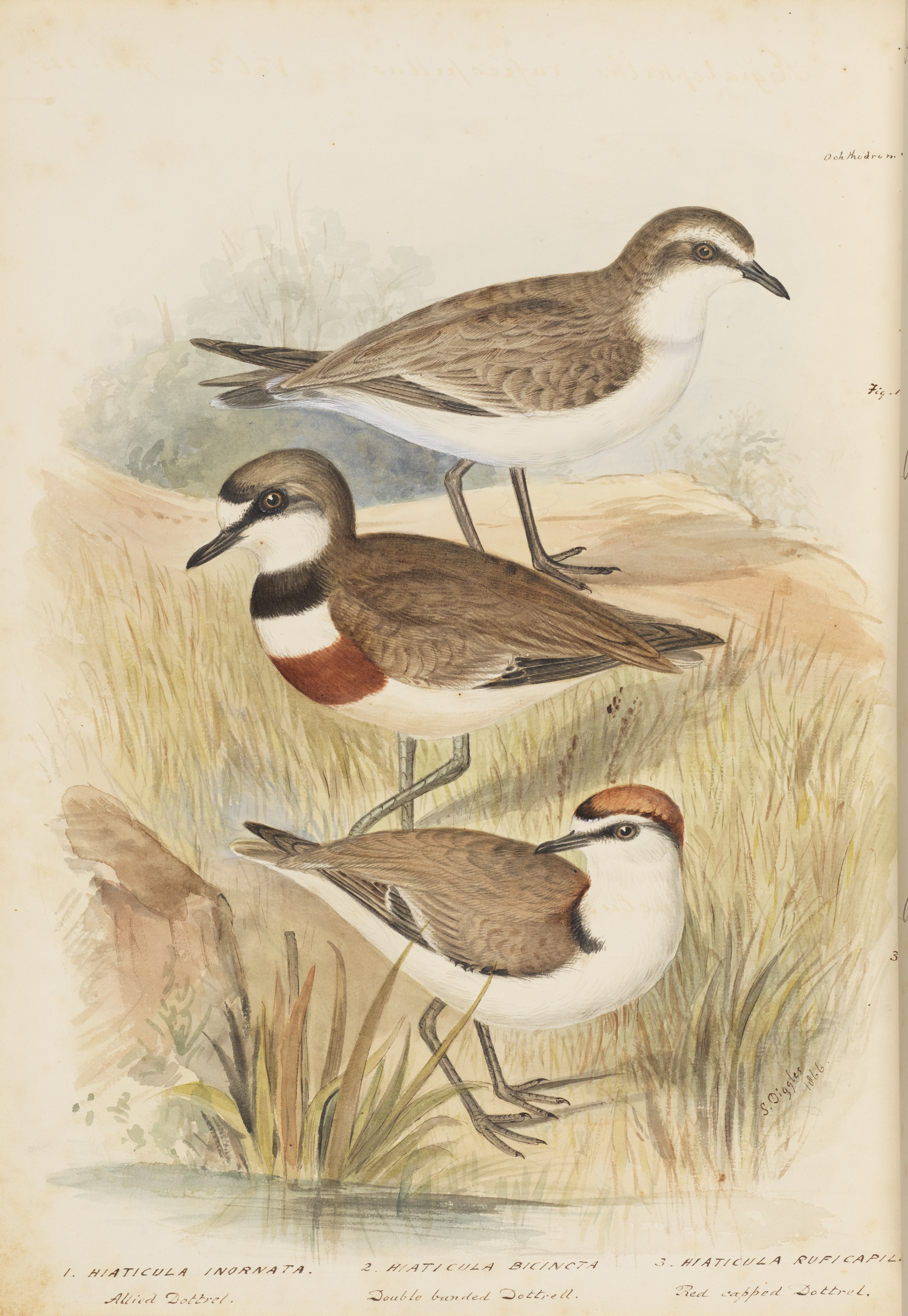
Watercolour painting of dottrels (plovers) – Siberian sand plover (Anarhynchus mongolus), double-banded plover (Anarhynchus bicinctus) and red-capped plover (Anarhynchus ruficapillus)

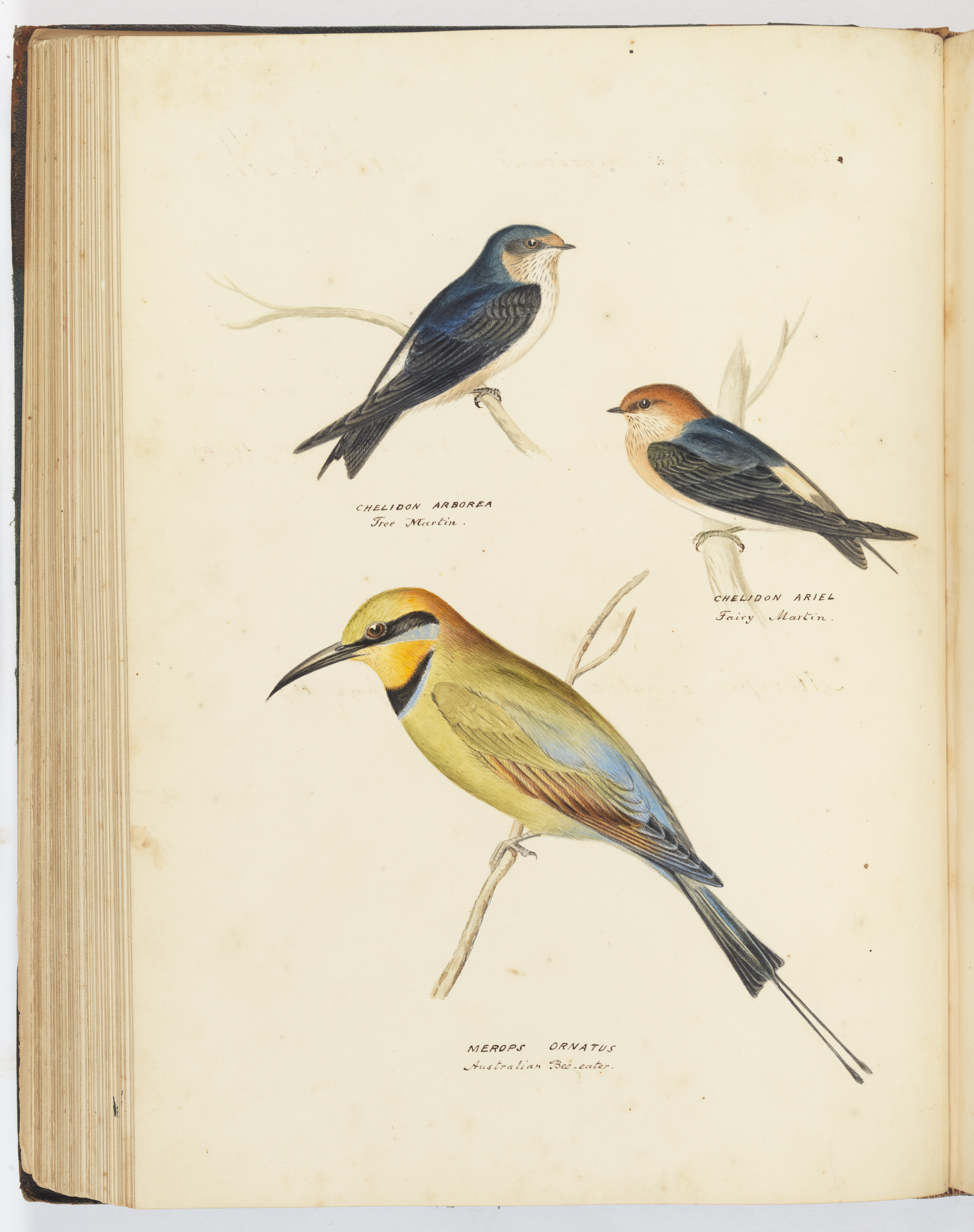
Watercolour painting of the tree martin (Petrochelidon nigricans), fairy martin (Petrochelidon ariel), and rainbow bee-eater (Merops ornatus), c. 1865

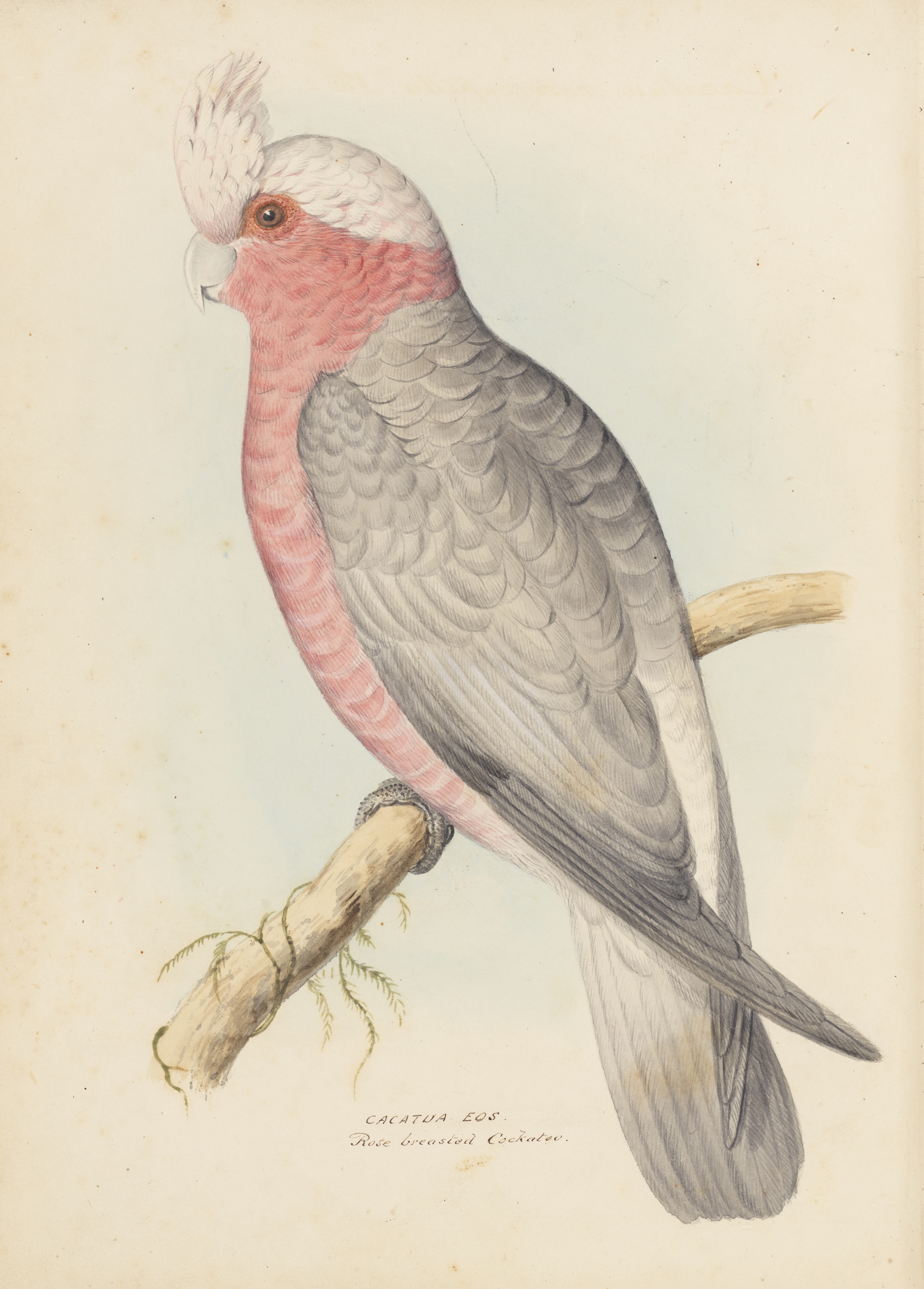
Watercolour painting of a galah (Eolophus roseicapilla)

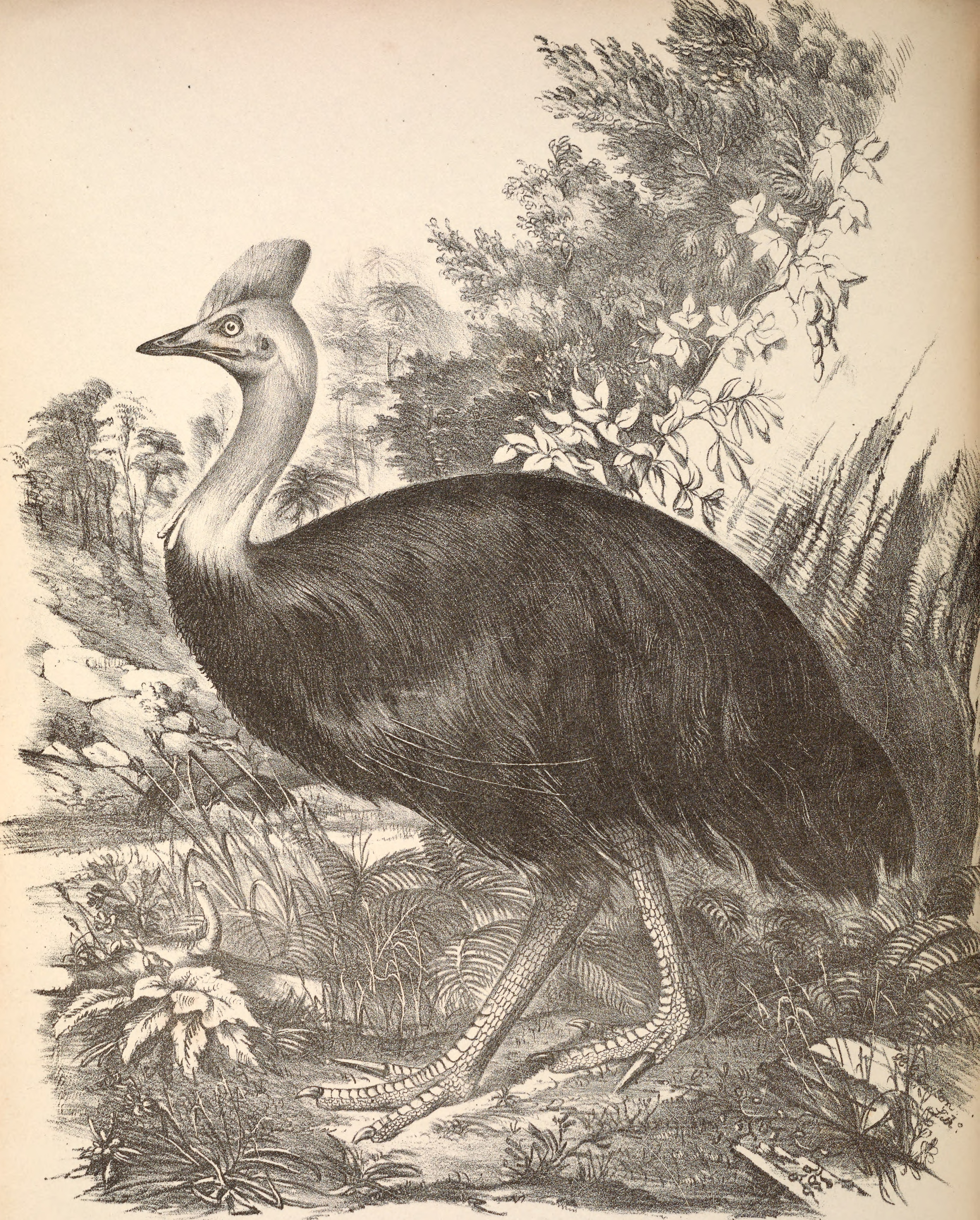
Lithographic print of a cassowary, published in Companion to Gould's Handbook (1877)

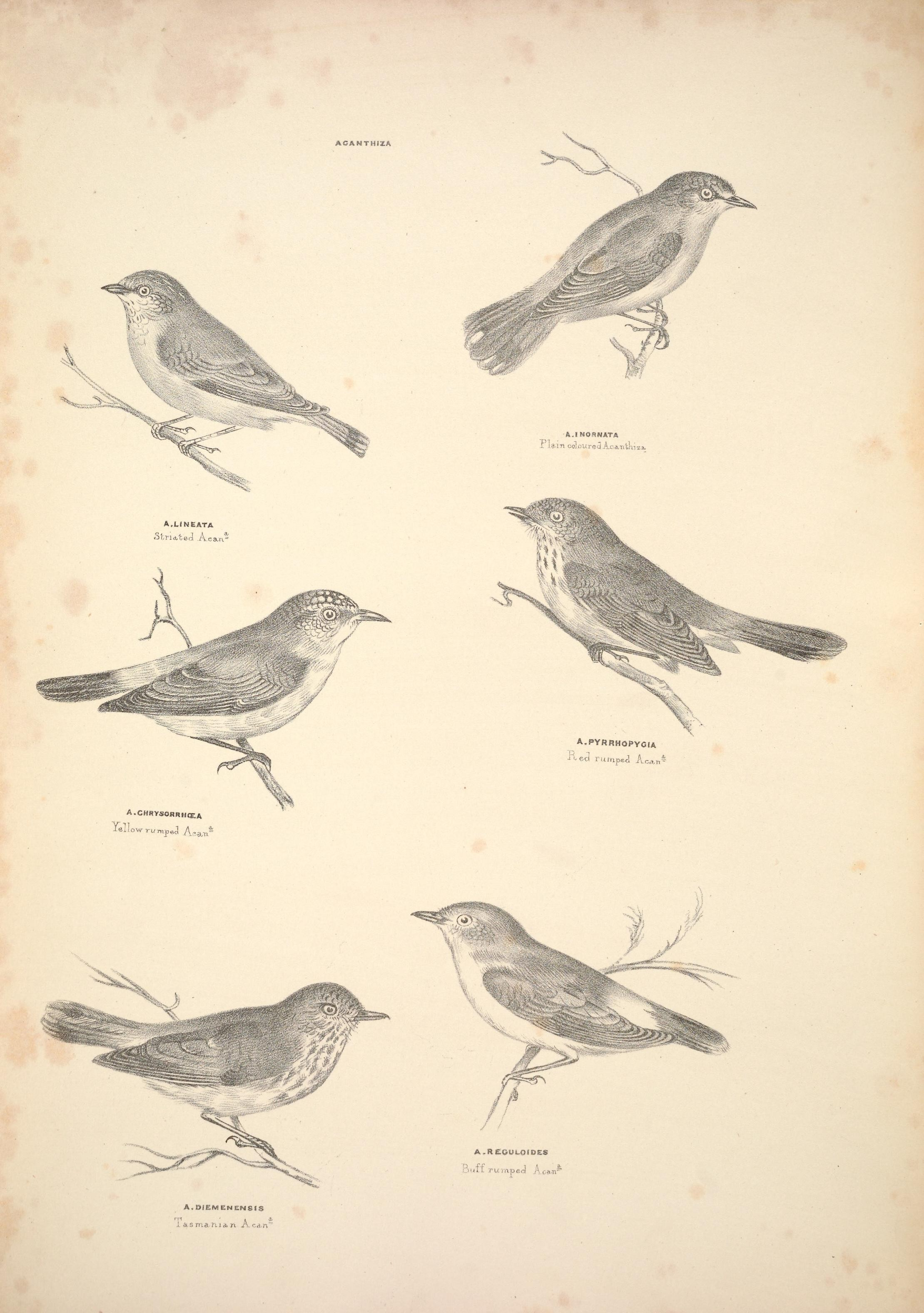
Lithographic print of Acanthiza species (thornbills), published in Companion to Gould's Handbook (1877)

== Sources ==
- Fisher, Rod (2000). "Silvester Diggles: Brisbane's Pioneer Musician, Scientist, Artist and New Churchman". Journal of the Royal Historical Society of Queensland. 17 (6, May 2000): 271–286.
- Marks, E. N. (1972). "Silvester Diggles (1817–1880)". Australian Dictionary of Biography. Vol. 4. National Centre of Biography, Australian National University. ISBN 978-0-522-84459-7. ISSN 1833-7538. OCLC 70677943.
- Whittell, Hubert Massey (1954). The Literature of Australian Birds: A History and a Bibliography of Australian Ornithology (PDF). Perth: Paterson Brokensha. LCCN 56000760. OCLC 2851290. OL 6194318M. Wikidata Q7747557.
