= 1872 in birding and ornithology =

- Years in birding and ornithology: 1869 1870 1871 1872 1873 1874 1875
- Centuries: 18th century · 19th century · 20th century
- Decades: 1840s 1850s 1860s 1870s 1880s 1890s 1900s
- Years: 1869 1870 1871 1872 1873 1874 1875

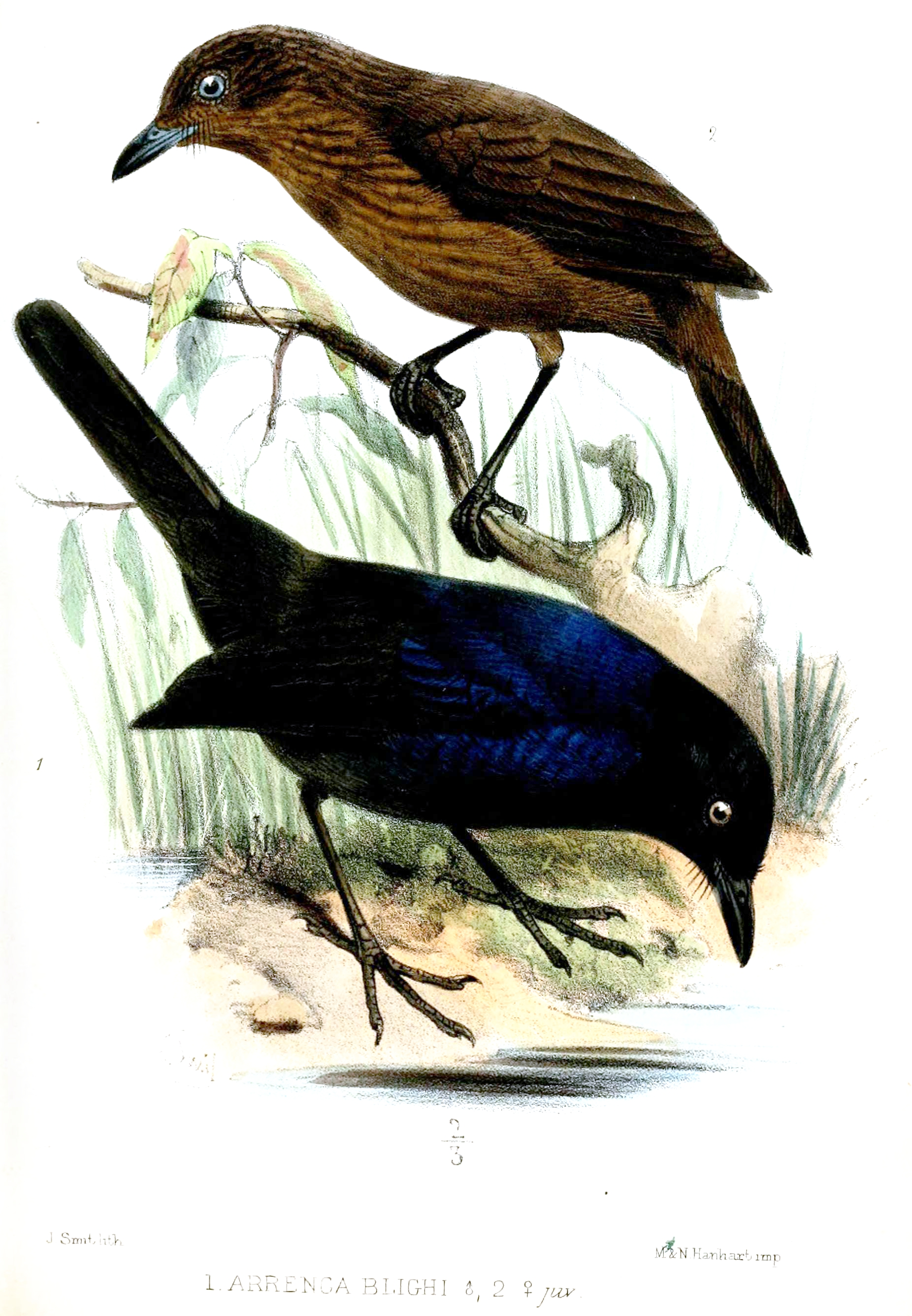
Sri Lanka whistling thrush in Proceedings of the Zoological Society of London, 1872

Birds described in 1872 include the Chilean flamingo, snowy egret, black-tailed crake, Cyprus warbler, Baikal bullfinch, Persian shearwater, red-fronted antpecker, Tibetan serin, Newton's parakeet and the orange fruit dove.

== Events ==
- Allan Octavian Hume starts the quarterly journal Stray Feathers in 1872 supported by Ferdinand Stoliczka, who was an editor for the Journal of the Asiatic Society.
- Henry Baker Tristram studies Bible localities and birds in Palestine.
- Richard Bowdler Sharpe's main work was in classifying and cataloguing the collections of the British Museum but also played a major role in acquiring private collections by persuading wealthy collectors and travellers to contribute to the museum. In 1872 the museum had 35,000 bird specimens; the collection had grown to half a million by the time of his death.

== Publications ==
- Juan Ignacio Molina Saggio sulla Storia Naturale del Chili
- Alphonse Milne-Edwards Resume des Recherches sur les Oiseaux Fossiles. C. R. vol. lxxiv. p. 1030, and Annales des Sciences Naturelles xvi. art. 2. [A resume of the principal discoveries made since 1856 in fossil birds, which the author' has embodied in his great work on this subject, now completed]. Translation as Investigations on Fossil Birds. Annals and Magazine of Natural History ser. 4. x. pp.
- Walter Buller A History of the Birds of New Zealand. London: Van Voorst (completed 1873)
- Otto Finsch "Zur Ornithologie der Samoa-Inseln". Journal für Ornithologie 1872
- George Ernest Shelley A Handbook to the Birds of Egypt (1872)
- Carl Jakob Sundevall, 1872. Methodi naturalis avium disponendarum tentamen. Försök till fogelklassens naturenliga uppställning. Stockholm, Samson & Wallin online BHL

== Ongoing events ==
- Theodor von Heuglin Ornithologie von Nordost-Afrika (Ornithology of Northeast Africa) (Cassel, 1869–1875)
- John Gould The Birds of Asia 1850-83 7 vols. 530 plates, Artists: J. Gould, H. C. Richter, W. Hart and J. Wolf; Lithographers: H. C. Richter and W. Hart
- Henry Eeles Dresser and Richard Bowdler Sharpe A History of the Birds of Europe, Including all the Species Inhabiting the Western Palearctic Region.Taylor & Francis of Fleet Street, London
- The Ibis
