= 1873 in birding and ornithology =

- Years in birding and ornithology: 1870 1871 1872 1873 1874 1875 1876
- Centuries: 18th century · 19th century · 20th century
- Decades: 1840s 1850s 1860s 1870s 1880s 1890s 1900s
- Years: 1870 1871 1872 1873 1874 1875 1876

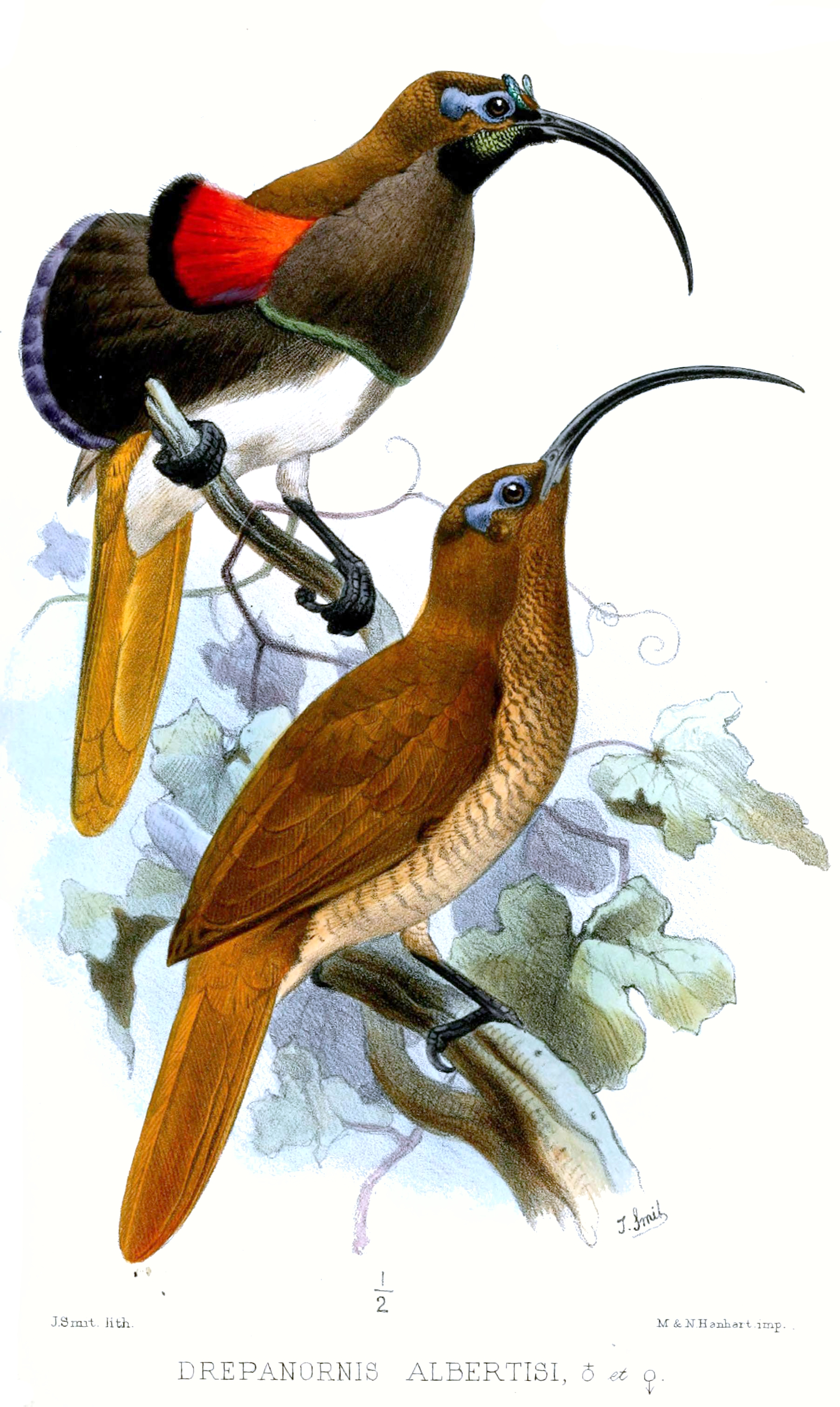
Black-billed sicklebill

Birds described in 1873 include the white-browed tit-warbler, Bartlett's tinamou, Von Schrenck's bittern, Raggiana bird-of-paradise, spangled coquette, Sangihe hanging parrot and the white-crowned penduline tit.

== Events ==
- Death of Jules Verreaux
- Nuttall Ornithological Club founded.

== Publications ==
- Nikolai Severtzov (1873). "Vertical and Horizontal Distribution of Turkestan Wildlife" Proceedings of the Imperial Society of Amateurs of Natural Sciences, Anthropology and Ethnography of Moscow. 8 (2). p 270. (in Russian)
- Philip Sclater & Osbert Salvin (1873). Nomenclator avium neotropicalium: sive avium quae in regione neotropica hucusque repertae sunt nomina systematice disposita adjecta sua cuique speciei patria accedunt generum et specierum novarum diagnoses. London: Sumptibus Auctorum. J. W. Elliot. viii + 163pp. via the Biodiversity Heritage Library.
- Paolo Savi Ornitologia Italiana Firenze :Successori Le Monnier,1873-1876. (opera posthuma 1873–1876) BHL
- Elliott Coues 1873. Some United States birds, new to science, and other things ornithological. The American Naturalist 7: 321–331.

== Ongoing events ==
- Theodor von Heuglin Ornithologie von Nordost-Afrika (Ornithology of Northeast Africa) (Cassel, 1869–1875)
- John Gould The Birds of Asia 1850-83 7 vols. 530 plates, Artists: J. Gould, H. C. Richter, W. Hart and J. Wolf; Lithographers: H. C. Richter and W. Hart
- Henry Eeles Dresser and Richard Bowdler Sharpe A History of the Birds of Europe, Including all the Species Inhabiting the Western Palearctic Region.Taylor & Francis of Fleet Street, London
- The Ibis
