= 1875 in birding and ornithology =

- Years in birding and ornithology: 1872 1873 1874 1875 1876 1877 1878
- Centuries: 18th century · 19th century · 20th century
- Decades: 1840s 1850s 1860s 1870s 1880s 1890s 1900s
- Years: 1872 1873 1874 1875 1876 1877 1878

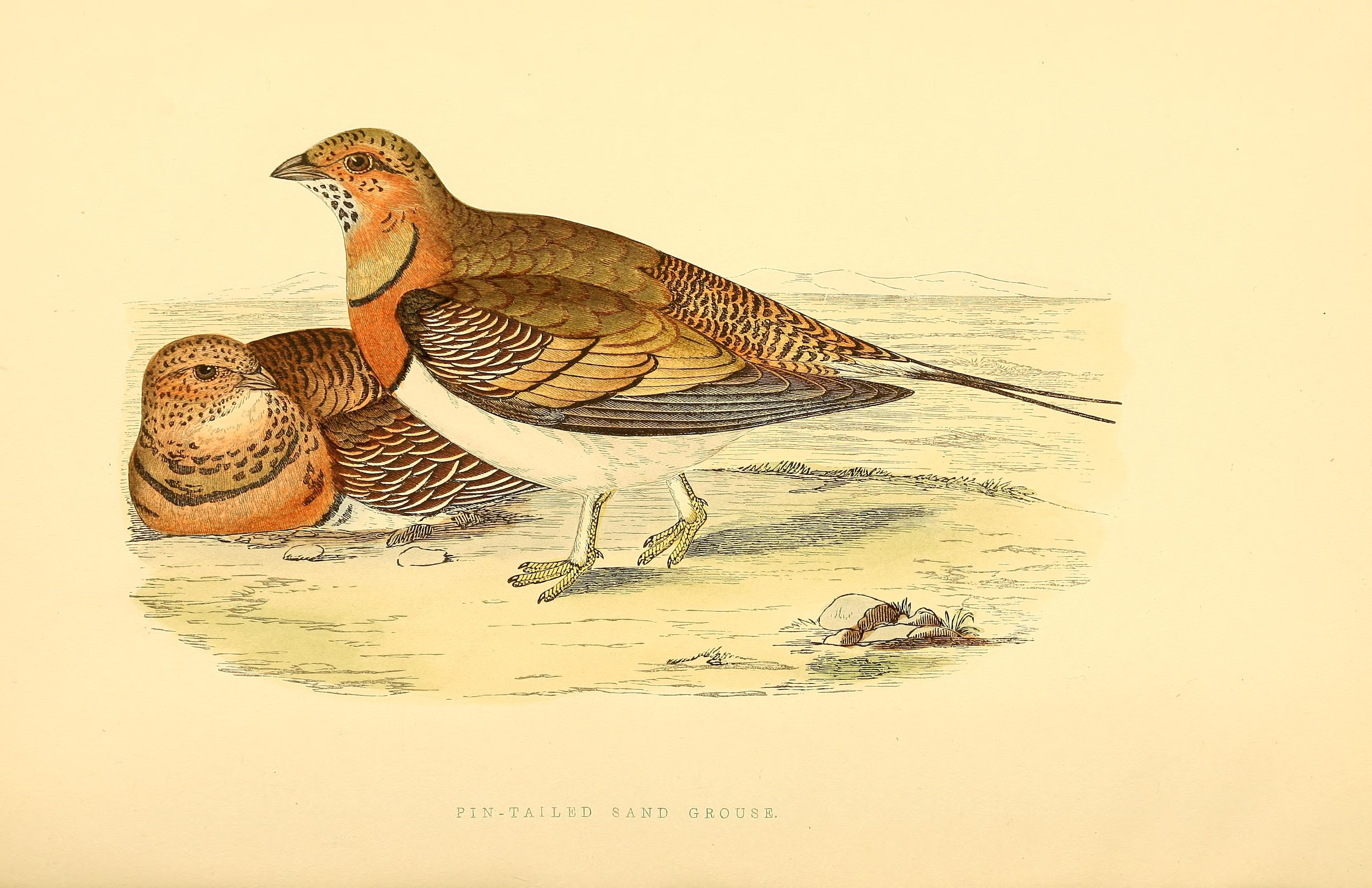
A pin-tailed sandgrouse from Charles Robert Bree's A History of the Birds of Europe, Not Observed in the British Isles

Birds described in 1875 include the Anjouan sparrowhawk, Caucasian grouse, Nelson's sparrow, yellow-capped pygmy parrot, red-tailed shrike, spotted catbird, spectacled barwing, tit berrypecker, bridled honeyeater and Taczanowski's tinamou.

== Events ==
- Death of Carl Jakob Sundevall
- Death of John Edward Gray
- Joseph Marshall Wade establishes a popular journal The Ornithologist and Oologist

== Publications ==
- Howard Irby The Ornithology of the Straits of Gibraltar R. H. Porter, 1875
- Richard Bowdler Sharpe Catalogue of the Striges, Or Nocturnal Birds of Prey, in the Collection of the British Museum. (1875).
- John Gould The birds of New Guinea and the adjacent Papuan islands : including many new species recently discovered in Australia London :Henry Sotheran & Co.,1875-1888. online BHL

== Ongoing events ==
- Theodor von Heuglin Ornithologie von Nordost-Afrika (Ornithology of Northeast Africa) (Cassel, 1869–1875)
- John Gould The Birds of Asia 1850-83 7 vols. 530 plates, Artists: J. Gould, H. C. Richter, W. Hart and J. Wolf; Lithographers: H. C. Richter and W. Hart
- Henry Eeles Dresser and Richard Bowdler Sharpe A History of the Birds of Europe, Including all the Species Inhabiting the Western Palearctic Region. Taylor & Francis of Fleet Street, London.
- Etienne Mulsant, Histoire Naturelle des Oiseaux-Mouches, ou Colibris constituant la famille des Trochilides (published 1874-77)
- Paolo Savi Ornitologia Italiana Firenze :Successori Le Monnier,1873-1876. (opera posthuma 1873–1876)
- The Ibis
