= 1871 in birding and ornithology =

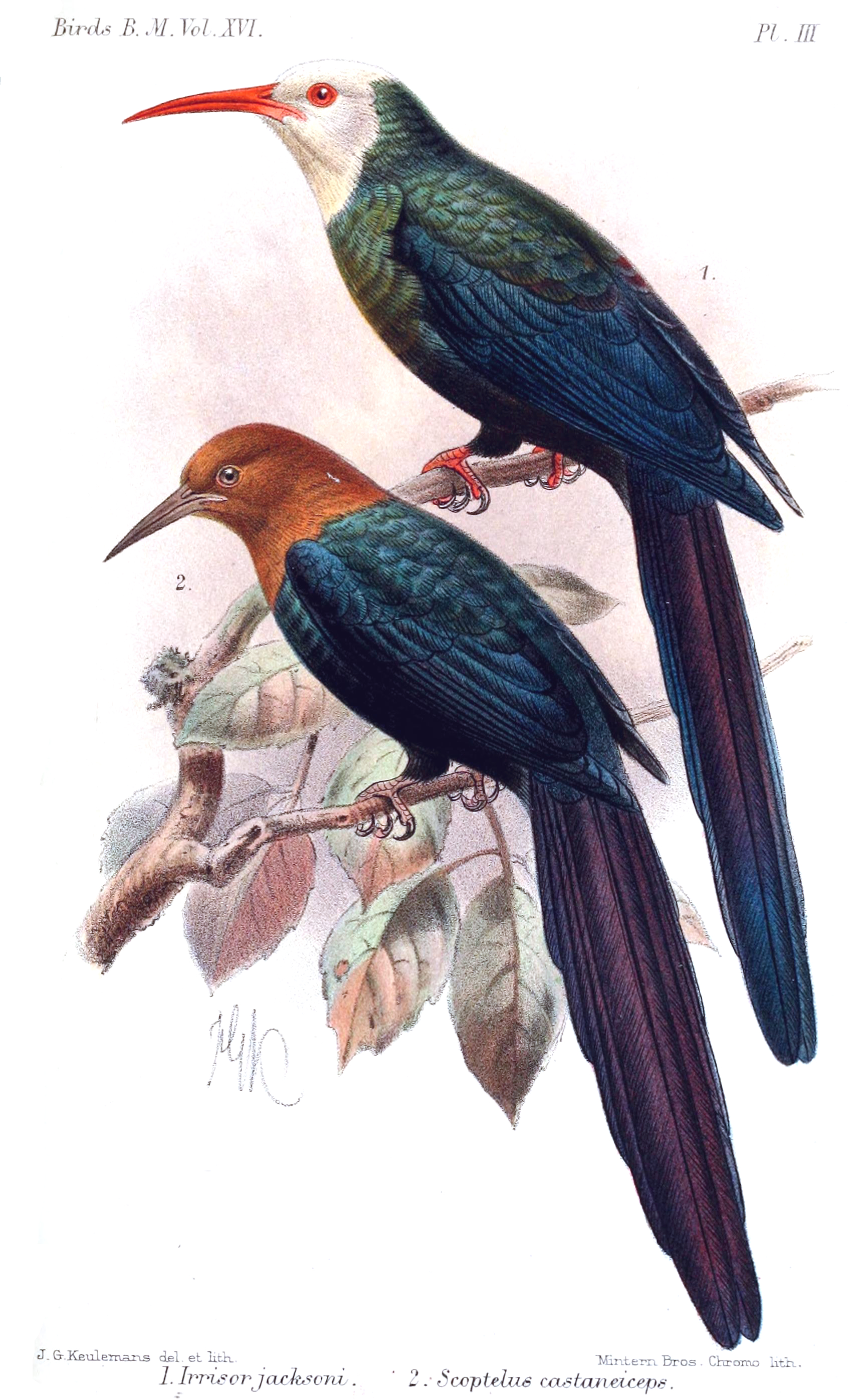
the Forest wood hoopoe

- Birds described in 1871 include Asian ostrich, Père David's snowfinch, Biak lorikeet, Mongolian ground jay, Forest wood hoopoe, Numfor paradise kingfisher, Spot-breasted parrotbill

== Events ==
- Deaths of Paolo Savi and Niels Kjærbølling
- Théophile Rudolphe Studer becomes curator of zoological collections at the Natural History Museum of Bern

== Publications ==
- Richard Bowdler Sharpe. Catalogue of African Birds in the Collection of R.B. Sharpe. London: Self-published. 1871.
- Henry Eeles Dresser and Richard Bowdler Sharpe. A History of the Birds of Europe, Including all the Species Inhabiting the Western Palearctic Region. London: Self-published. 1871.
- Frederick Hutton. Catalogue of the Birds of New Zealand, with Diagnoses of the Species. Wellington: Published by Command. 1871.

Ongoing events

- Theodor von Heuglin Ornithologie von Nordost-Afrika (Ornithology of Northeast Africa) (Cassel, 1869–1875)
- John Gould The birds of Asia 1850-83 7 vols. 530 plates, Artists: J. Gould, H. C. Richter, W. Hart and J. Wolf; Lithographers:H. C. Richter and W. Hart
- The Ibis
