= Harald von Loudon =

Baltic German ornithologist

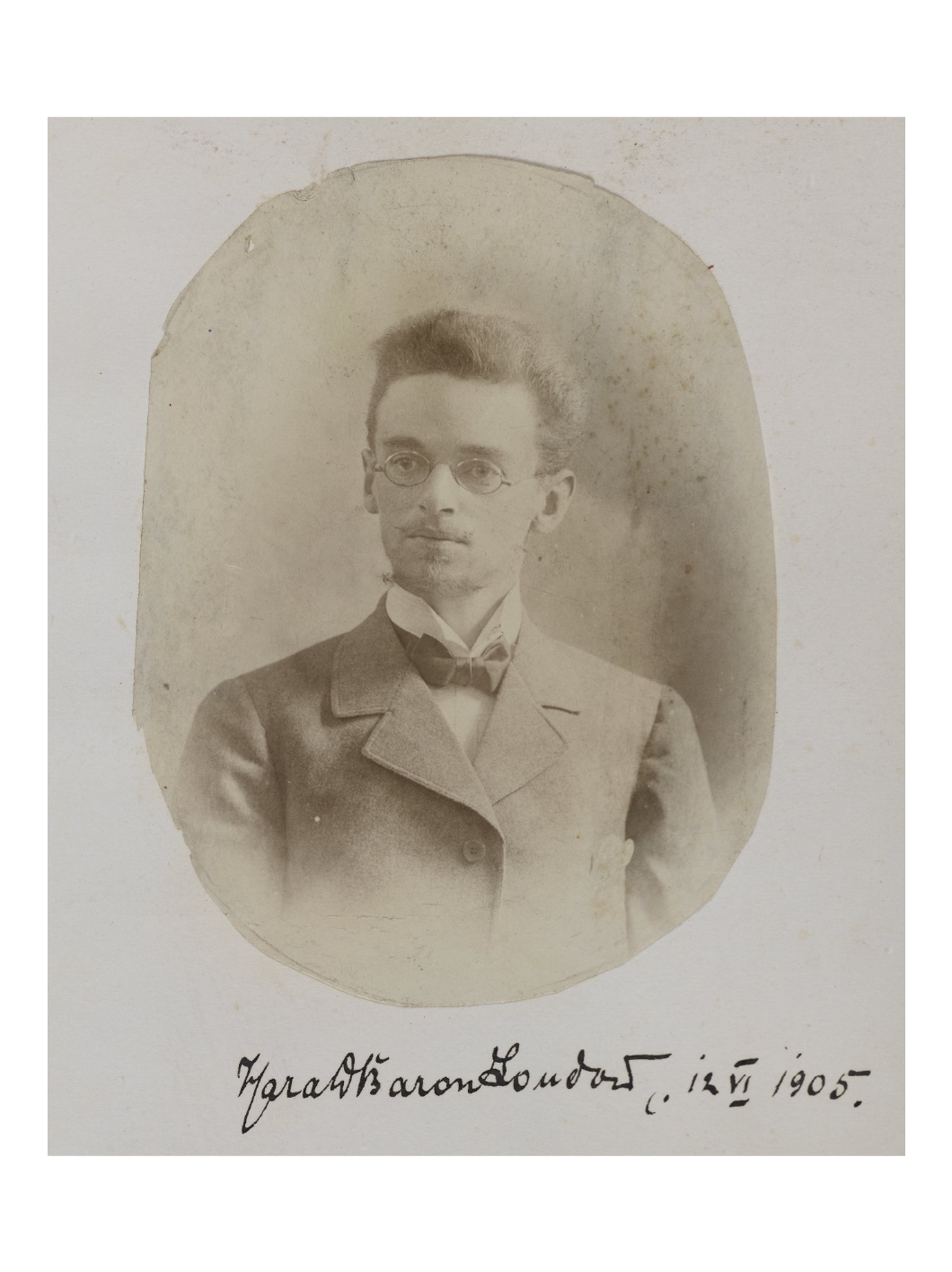
1905 photo from the Henry Eeles Dresser album

Baron Harald Georg Gideon Freiherr von Loudon (11 April 1876 – 1 January 1959) was a Baltic German ornithologist.

== Life and work ==
Baron Harald von Loudon was born in the Governorate of Livonia. He belonged to a Baltic Noble family and studied zoology in Saint Petersburg at the Zoological Museum of the Russian Academy of Sciences. He began his ornithological research in the 1890s, making observations near his home in the vicinity of Valmiera and Cēsis in present-day Latvia. At this time he started his personal collection of bird eggs. At least from 1894, this collection grew in both size and scope, encompassing not only eggs but also whole birds, skeletons and skulls. His first publication appeared in 1895 in the journal of the Riga Association of Natural Scientists (Der Naturforscherverein zu Riga), predecessor of the Natural History Museum of Latvia. He kept making systematic research of the bird-life of Latvia until at least 1917. In the spring of 1896, he went on a scientific journey to the southern part of the Russian Empire, during which he made the acquaintance of Gustav Radde and Nikolai Zarudny. The latter became a friend of von Loudon and they kept regular contact. von Loudon came to make an additional five such ornithological expeditions, to the Caucasus, the Caspian Sea, Crimea and Central Asia. In 1904, he hosted Henry Eeles Dresser at his estate in Latvia, and one year later he himself travelled to London to participate in an international conference on ornithology; he was one of only five Russian citizens to participate.

Von Loudon accumulated a vast collection of birds, bird eggs and other scientific material, as well as a vast ornithological library. During the Russian revolution of 1917, von Loudon was forced to flee the country and settle in Germany. Here he gradually moved away from ornithology in favor of politics, participating in the activities of the Society of Baltic Germans. In 1922 his property including manor with lands (513 hectares) was confiscated by Latvian state for his help to the German troops during the war. His collection suffered from mistreatment during World War I, but parts of it were rescued and eventually ended up in the University of Latvia; the main part of the collection was however evacuated to present-day Kaliningrad in 1939 and probably destroyed there during World War II. The ornithological library ended up in the National Library of Latvia. He was married to Magda Margaretha Lolli Maria von Zur-Mühlen (1876-1913) after whom Loudon and Zarudny named a subspecies of bird, Galerida cristata magdae in 1903.
