= 1869 in birding and ornithology =

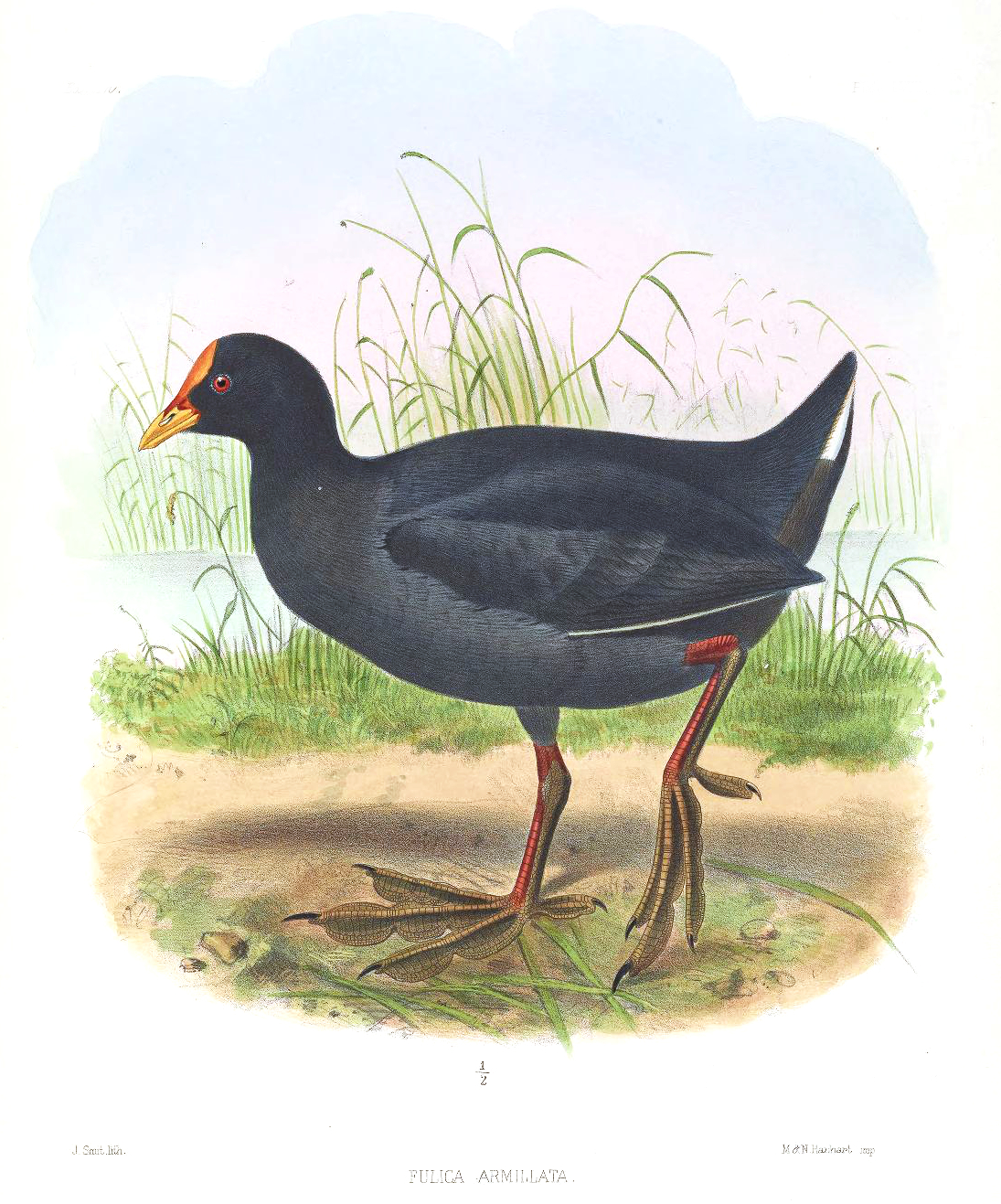
Exotic Ornithology: Containing Figures and Descriptions of New Or Rare Species of American Birds. Plate by Joseph Smit illustrating Fulica armillata

Birds described in 1869 include Hartlaub's spurfowl, subantarctic shearwater, Himalayan vulture, Palani laughingthrush, Anchieta's barbet and the long-tailed myna.

== Events ==
John Gerrard Keulemans was persuaded by Richard Bowdler Sharpe to illustrate his A Monograph of the Alcedinidae, or Family of Kingfishers (1868-1871)

== Publications ==
- Tommaso Salvadori Monografia del Gener Ceyx Lacépède. Torino (1869) (Atti della Accademia delle Scienze di Torino)
- Jean-Joseph Zéphirin Gerbe Les Oiseaux décrits et figurés d'après la classification de Georges Cuvier, mise au courant des progrès de la science, (1869).
- Otto Finsch and Gustav Hartlaub On a small Collection of Birds from the Tonga Islands Proceedings of the Zoological Society of London 1869 online
- Osbert Salvin and Philip Sclater On Peruvian birds collected by Mr Whitely Proceedings of the Zoological Society of London. 1869 592-596 online

== Ongoing events ==
- Theodor von Heuglin Ornithologie von Nordost-Afrika (Ornithology of Northeast Africa) (Cassel, 1869–1875)
- John Gould The Birds of Australia Supplement 1851–69. 1 vol. 81 plates; Artists: J. Gould and H. C. Richter; Lithographer: H. C. Richter
- John Gould The Birds of Asia 1850-83 7 vols. 530 plates, Artists: J. Gould, H. C. Richter, W. Hart and J. Wolf; Lithographers:H. C. Richter and W. Hart
- The Ibis
