= 1874 in birding and ornithology =

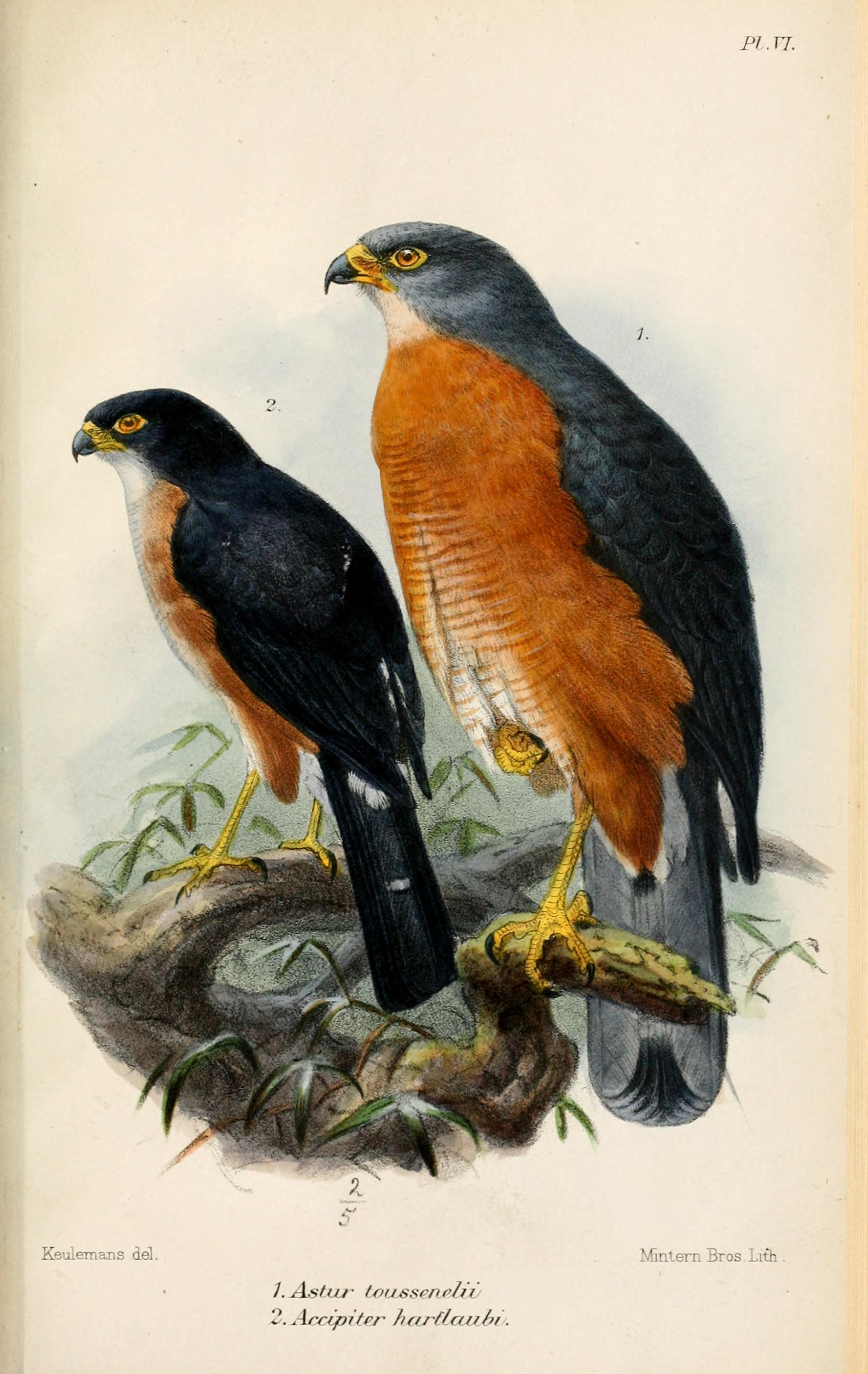
Catalogue of the Birds in the British Museum

- Birds described in 1874 include Island leaf warbler, Bar-bellied pitta, Coppery-naped puffleg, Streak-throated barwing, Red-and-white spinetail, Papuan hawk-owl, Bay-vented cotinga, Arfak catbird, Rufous-webbed brilliant

== Events ==
- Death of Ferdinand Stoliczka

== Publications ==
- Spencer Fullerton Baird, Thomas Mayo Brewer, and Robert Ridgway, 1874. A History of North American Birds: Land Birds. Little, Brown, Boston. Volume I, 596 pp.; Volume II, 590 pp.; Volume III, 560 pp. Retrieved 14 January 2013. A special edition, published in the same year, of 50 copies contained 36 plates hand-colored by Ridgway.[110]1873
- Henry Haversham Godwin-Austen, Birds of Assam (1870–1878)
- Richard Bowdler Sharpe, Catalogue of the Birds in the British Museum London
- Władysław Taczanowski 1874. Description des Oiseaux nouveaux du Pérou central Proceedings of the Zoological Society of London 1874
- Etienne Mulsant, Histoire Naturelle des Oiseaux-Mouches, ou Colibris constituant la famille des Trochilides (published 1874–77)

Ongoing events

- Theodor von Heuglin Ornithologie von Nordost-Afrika (Ornithology of Northeast Africa) (Cassel, 1869–1875)
- John Gould The birds of Asia 1850-83 7 vols. 530 plates, Artists: J. Gould, H. C. Richter, W. Hart and J. Wolf; Lithographers:H. C. Richter and W. Hart
- Henry Eeles Dresser and Richard Bowdler Sharpe A History of the Birds of Europe, Including all the Species Inhabiting the Western Palearctic Region.Taylor & Francis of Fleet Street, London
- Paolo Savi Ornitologia Italiana Firenze :Successori Le Monnier,1873-1876. (opera posthuma 1873–1876)
- The Ibis
