= Animal of the Year in Latvia =

Animal of the Year in Latvia is an annual nomination of an animal species of the Latvian fauna that is need of protection or attention. The designated animal species of the year is selected by the Latvian Museum of Natural History.

Even though the selected species may be common and not necessarily endangered, it may be an indicator of changes in their natural habitats. Therefore, additional events and measures are taken to protect and monitor the title-holding species. There have also been occurrences of selection of two species in a single year – in 2021, 2023, and 2025.

This category has been present since 2000. Usually, the announcement for this category is available on the first weeks of January.

== Selected species by the year ==
- 2000 – Eurasian lynx (Lynx lynx)
- 2001 – Ena montana
- 2002 – Freshwater pearl mussel (Margaritifera margaritifera)
- 2003 – European stag beetle (Lucanus cervus)
- 2004 – Harbour porpoise (Phocaena phocaena)
- 2005 – European edible dormouse (Glis glis)
- 2006 – Siberian flying squirrel (Pteromys volans)
- 2007 – Natterjack toad (Bufo calamita)
- 2008 – Gray seal (Halichoerus grypus)
- 2009 – Brown bear (Ursus arctos)
- 2010 – Eurasian otter (Lutra lutra)
- 2011 – Western barbastelle (Barbastella barbastellus)
- 2012 – Smooth snake (Coronella austriaca)
- 2013 – European pond turtle (Emys orbicularis)
- 2014 – Grey wolf (Canis lupus)
- 2015 – Wild boar (Sus scrofa)
- 2016 – European badger (Meles meles)
- 2017 – European eel (Anguilla anguilla)
- 2018 – Red squirrel (Sciurus vulgaris)
- 2019 – Moose (Alces alces)
- 2020 – Eurasian beaver (Castor fiber)
- 2021 – Hare genus members: European hare (Lepus europaeus) and mountain hare (Lepus timidus)
- 2022 – Least weasel (Mustela nivalis)
- 2023 – Wall lizard family members: Viviparous lizard (Zootoca vivipara) and sand lizard (Lacerta agilis)
- 2024 – Roe deer (Capreolus capreolus)
- 2025 – Hedgehog genus members: Northern white-breasted hedgehog (Erinaceus roumanicus) and European hedgehog (Erinaceus europaeus)
- 2026 – Common toad (Bufo bufo)
