= 1870 in birding and ornithology =

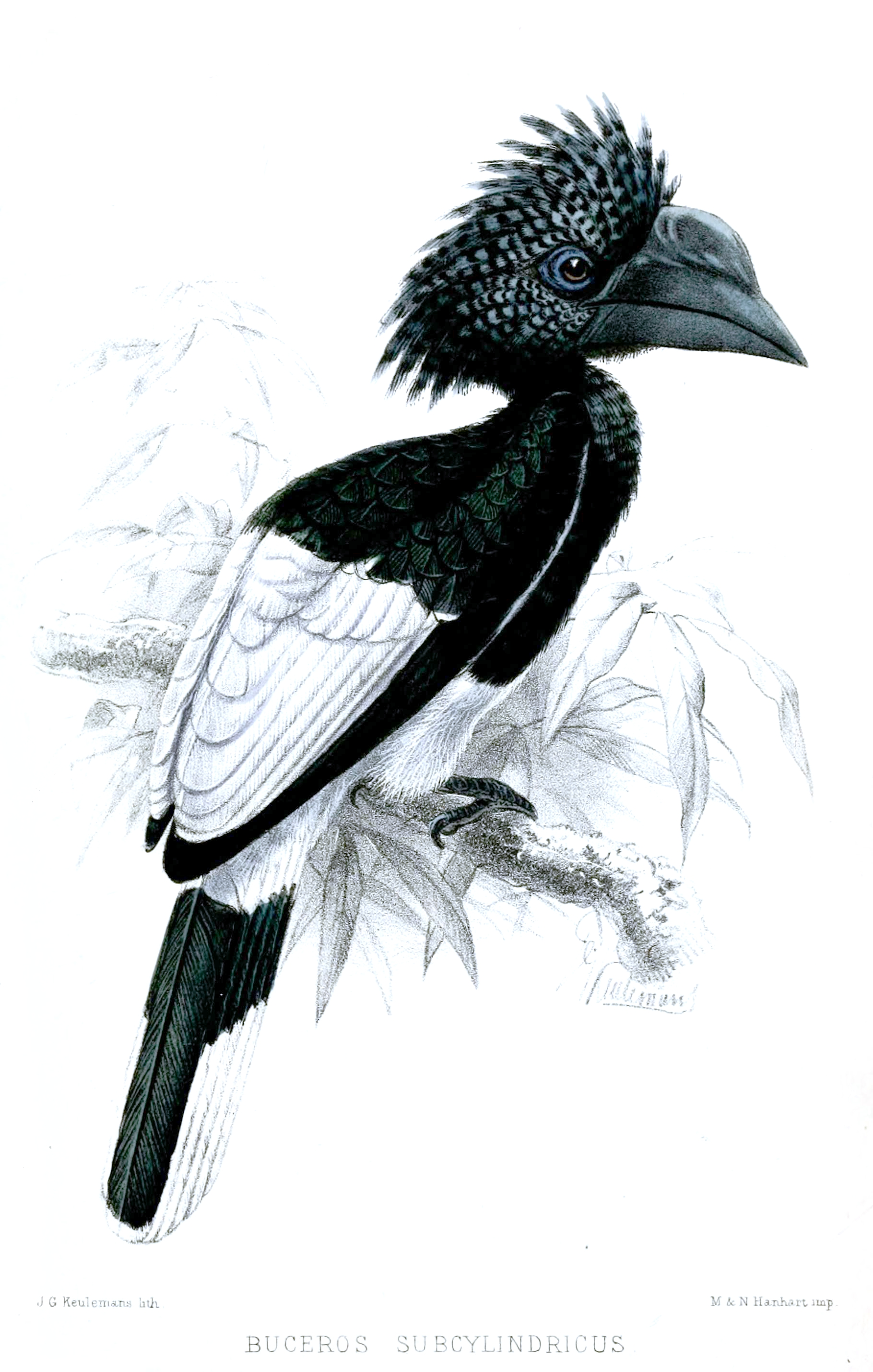
Black-and-white-casqued hornbill Proceedings Zoological Society of London 1870

Birds described in 1870 include Recurve-billed bushbird, Beautiful woodpecker, Philepittidae, Cantorchilus semibadius, Chinese barbet, White-naped seedeater, Belem curassow.

== Events ==
Death of Johann Heinrich Blasius

Death of Friedrich Boie

== Publications ==
- George Newbold Lawrence, 1870. A Catalogue of the Birds found in Costa Rica. Annals of the Lyceum of Natural History of New York 9: 86–149
- Philip Lutley Sclater & Osbert Salvin, 1870. Descriptions of new Species of Birds from the United States of Columbia. Proceedings of the Zoological Society of London Pt.3: 840–844, pl.53
- Silvester Diggles publishes the third and last volume of The Ornithology of Australia.
- Daniel Giraud Elliot A Monograph of the Phasianidae (Family of the Pheasants) (1870–72)

Ongoing events

- Theodor von Heuglin Ornithologie von Nordost-Afrika (Ornithology of Northeast Africa) (Cassel, 1869–1875)
- John Gould The birds of Asia 1850-83 7 vols. 530 plates, Artists: J. Gould, H. C. Richter, W. Hart and J. Wolf; Lithographers:H. C. Richter and W. Hart
- The Ibis
