= John Gerrard Keulemans =

Dutch bird artist (1842–1912)

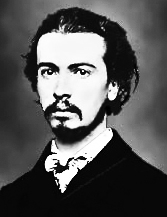
- J. G. Keulemans
- Born: 8 June 1842; Rotterdam, Netherlands
- Died: 29 March 1912 (aged 69); Ilford, England
- Known for: Natural history illustration

Johannes Gerardus Keulemans (8 June 1842 – 29 March 1912) was a Dutch bird illustrator. For most of his life he lived and worked in England, illustrating many of the best-known ornithology books of the nineteenth century.

== Biography ==
Keulemans was born in Rotterdam. As a young man he collected animal specimens for museums such as the Natural History Museum in Leiden, whose director, Hermann Schlegel, encouraged Keulemans and sent him on the 1864 expedition to West Africa. In 1869, he was persuaded by Richard Bowdler Sharpe to illustrate his Monograph of the Alcedinidae, or Family of Kingfishers (1868–1871) and to move to England, where he lived for the rest of his life. He was married twice, and had eight children by his first wife and seven children by his second wife. Only nine of his children reached adulthood. He also wrote topics on spirituality, and claimed he had a premonition at the moment of death of one of his sons. He died in Ilford, Essex (now part of Greater London) and is buried in Buckingham Road cemetery, Ilford, in an unmarked grave.

== Work ==
Keulemans regularly provided illustrations for The Ibis and The Proceedings of the Zoological Society. He illustrated many important bird books, including Buller's A History of the Birds of New Zealand (1873, 1888), William Vincent Legge's History of the Birds of Ceylon (1880), Daniel Giraud Elliot's Monograph of the Bucerotidae (hornbills) (1887–1892), Henry Seebohm's Monograph of the Turdidae (thrushes) (1902), Osbert Salvin's Biologia Centrali-Americana (1879–1904), Edgar Leopold Layard's Birds of South Africa (1887) and Henry Eeles Dresser's History of the Birds of Europe (1871–1896), and a single illustration in The Journal of the Linnean Society.

One of his last great achievements was his contribution of over one hundred plates for Frederick Du Cane Godman's Monograph of the Petrels (1907–1910). He also spent some time collecting birds in Cape Verde and West Africa.

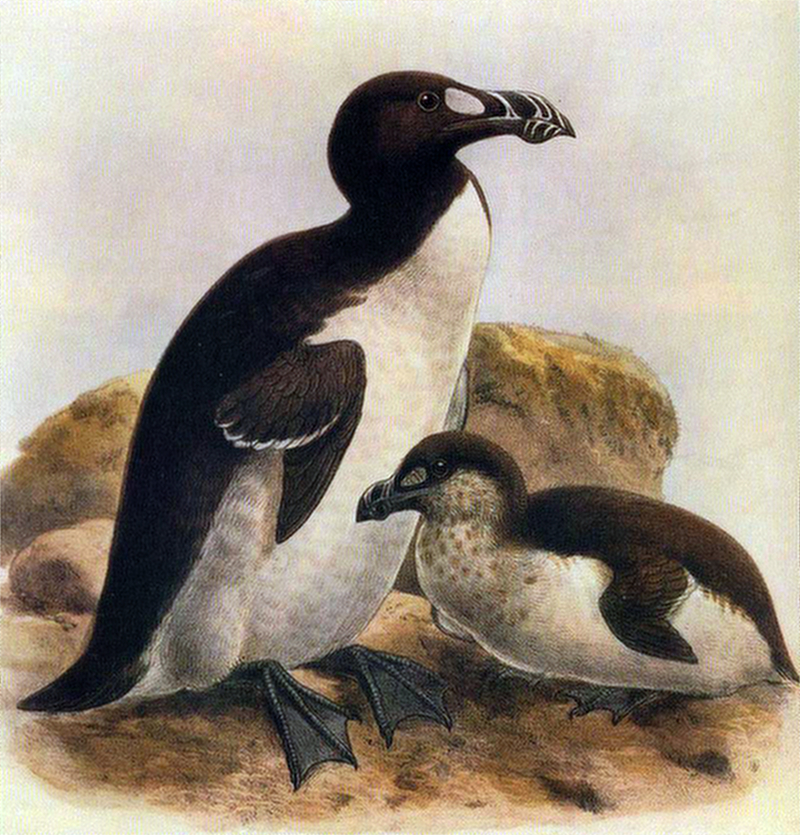
An illustration of the extinct great auk by Keulemans

Keulemans is credited with describing the Cape Verde swamp-warbler, Calamodyta (Acrocephalus) brevipennis. This is a drab bird about 14–16 cm., light brown above and on its flanks, and buff below. He did not publish an illustration of it, but his plate for Acrocephalus brunnescens in George Henderson's Lahore to Yarkand (pl. XVI) is similar. His notes and findings on the island of Principe, along with those of his colleague Dr. H. Dohrn, would eventually become the basis for a later description of a rare ibis, Lampribis rothschildi Bannerman.

The only significant biography of Keulemans is by Jan Coldewey and Tony Keulemans, Feathers to Brush, a book that includes a bibliography of the artist's publications, a genealogical tree and appendices detailing his spiritualism, with a sample of his financial correspondence. Also of note is a contemporary obituary of Keulemans in the journal British Birds (1912). Tony Keulemans later wrote Beyond the grave, which tells the story of a remarkable discovery of a painting John Gerrard had made of his own gravestone. And finally, Tony Keulemans wrote an errata list to Feathers to Brush, which includes additional literature references and new genealogical findings.

Keulemans's work is characterised by its consistency, showing little change over the course of his career, and focused to an extraordinary degree on the rendering of fine detail. These generalisations have also proven to be the basis for unjustified criticism of his work, since the nature of scientific illustration places a premium on consistency. Aside from this, a number of critics have rightly placed Keulemans above his contemporaries; his ability to create accurate and vivid representations of birds gave him prominence in his field.

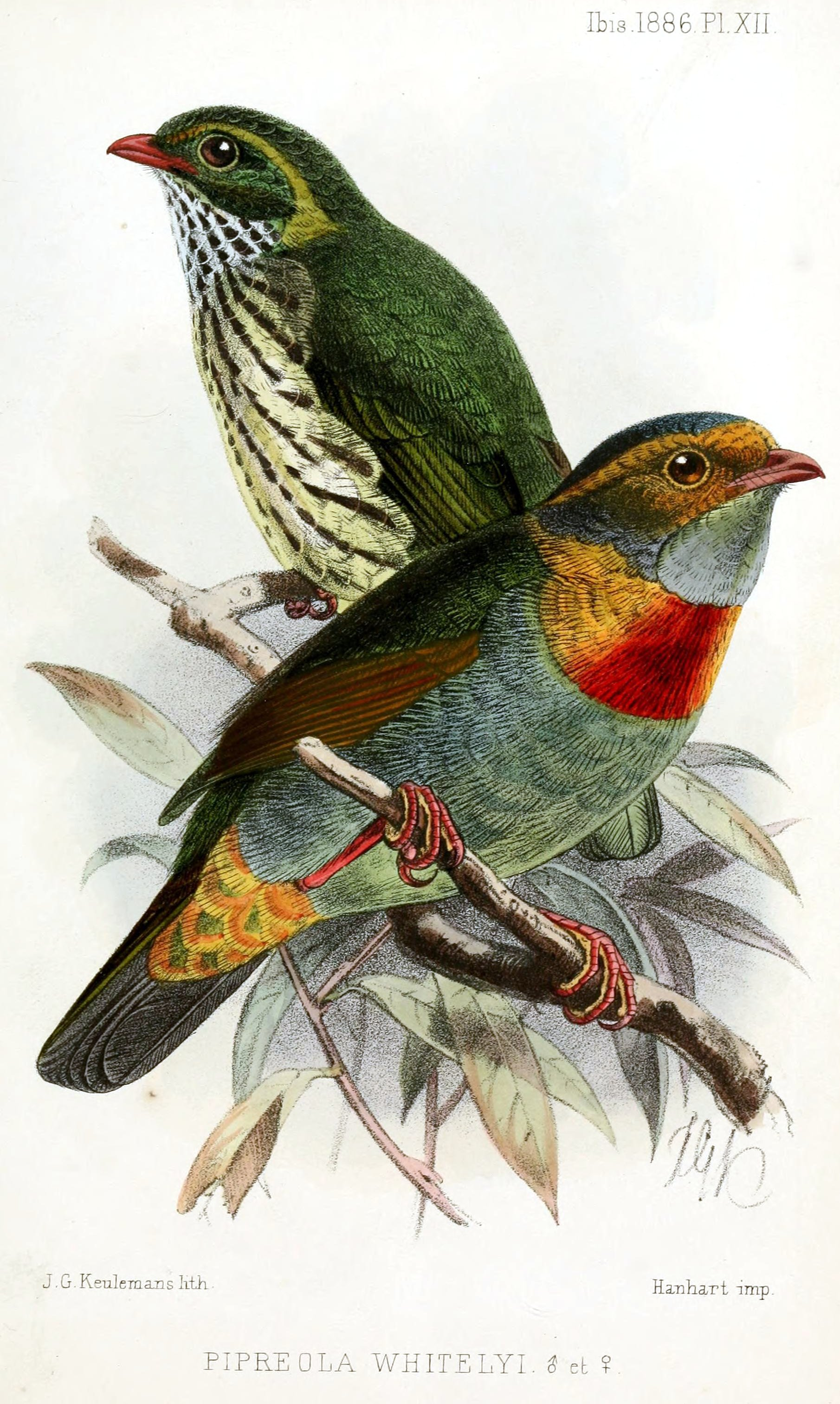
Red-banded fruiteater (Pipreola whitelyi), 1886

Keulemans was prodigious in his output – he was commissioned to paint pictures of birds extensively throughout his career, and his prints were published continuously from 1867 to 1911. Keulemans' first prints appeared in two books by Francois Pollen, Contributions a l'histoire naturelle des Lemuriens (1867) and Een blik in Madagascar (1867). Some appeared after his death until 1915 (Mathews, Birds of Australia); he had rendered the images on stone well before publication of these works. A calculation of his total output gives about 4,000–5,000 published illustrations. The vast majority of these were vignettes published within octavo-size books and publications, and a great number of his works also appeared in quarto (Dresser/Europe) and in folio (Seebohm/Turdidae and DuCane Godman/Petrels). While the subject of his illustrations was almost entirely avian, he was also commissioned to create portraits of mammals, insects, and shells.

Most of the illustrations by Keulemans were produced through traditional lithography, allowing for a finished product that depicts a vivid, lifelike figure through depth and tone. Printing was carried out by the two firms of Mintern and Hanhart, and early in his career, some were printed by P. M. W. Trap. Often, the published lithographs were not coloured, and perhaps some (Journal of the Linnean Society, 1878) were not intended to be coloured. The technique of lithography made it necessary for the print to be coloured by hand. This was done by semi-skilled artisans working in an assembly line in a manner similar to stencilling. While Keulemans' talents as a draughtsman were hardly disputed by his contemporaries, often the finished, coloured plates were the subject of criticism (Sharpe/Alcedinidae). If the depicted colours did not match those of the birds, the value of the finished product was diminished.

Keulemans painted remarkable pictures of extinct birds, including Walter Rothschild's Avifauna of Laysan, Extinct Birds (1907). Examples in the American Museum of Natural History in New York include the Choiseul crested pigeon, Kangaroo Island emu, huia, Lyall's wren, Hawaii oo, Hawaii mamo, Oahu oo, Guadalupe petrel, and the laughing owl.

=== Onze vogels in huis en tuin (Our birds in home and garden) ===
The only work that was not only illustrated but also written by Keulemans, was Onze vogels in huis en tuin (Our birds in home and garden). It was a three volume work in Dutch that appeared between 1869 and 1876.

- 1869: Onze vogels in huis en tuin vol. 1. 242 text pages; 70 images; 3 pages contents.
- 1873: Onze vogels in huis en tuin vol. 2. 232 text pages; 70 images; 3 pages contents.
- 1876: Onze vogels in huis en tuin vol. 3. 194 text pages; 60 images; 3 pages contents.

In this work Keulemans does write about a number of native birds, but he also describes (and paints) a number of cagebirds and aviary birds.

Keulemans is famous for his illustrations, but in this book he shows that he is a very able observer of birds in the field as well. The chapter on the common cuckoo Cuculus canorus in vol. 2, for instance, has 13 pages of text, with a number of field observations by Keulemans. In vol. 2 he describes the grey parrot (grijze roodstaartpapegaai) Psittacus erithacus in vol. 2, giving an extensive account of field observations done on the island of Príncipe in de Gulf of Guinea. Keulemans stayed there around 1865 during a year. Many other chapters of Onze vogels in huis en tuin also show that Keulemans was a careful observer of the species he painted and described.

== Interest in spiritualism ==
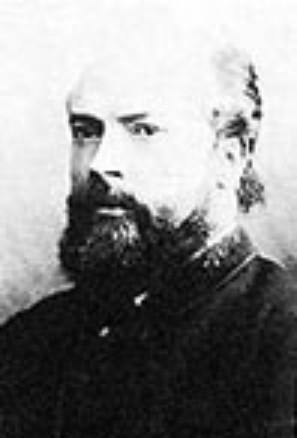
An older Keulemans

According to the authors of Keulemans' biography Feathers to Brush, the artist's interest in spiritualism began with a premonition of his son Isidore's death. In an article in the Bristol Mercury and Daily Post of 3 March 1883, Keulemans tells how he and his family were living in Paris in December 1880 when there was an outbreak of smallpox. The parents sent three of their children to London to live with their grandparents; one of the children was his favourite son Isidore, aged four. In the morning of 24 January 1881, Keulemans woke up and heard Isidore's voice and saw his face. The apparition returned the next day, which made Keulemans very uneasy. A few days later he received a letter from London to tell him Isidore was ill, when in fact he had died exactly on the day of the first appearance of Isidore in John Gerrard's dream.

Subsequently, Keulemans experienced further incidents increasing his belief in the supernatural, in particular which he claimed could be awakened via the painting of a bird's eye. Keulemans began an association with the Society for Psychical Research; later he became disenchanted with the prevalence of fraud in spiritualist society, and used his scientific training to expose the trickery he saw performed by mediums.

Keulemans claimed to have visited nearly 400 séances and gave some examples of the alleged trickery in support of his criticisms. He seems not to have been opposed to Spiritualism in its philosophical or metaphysical bases, but against its pretensions as a science based on demonstrable fact.

== List of major works to which Keulemans contributed ==
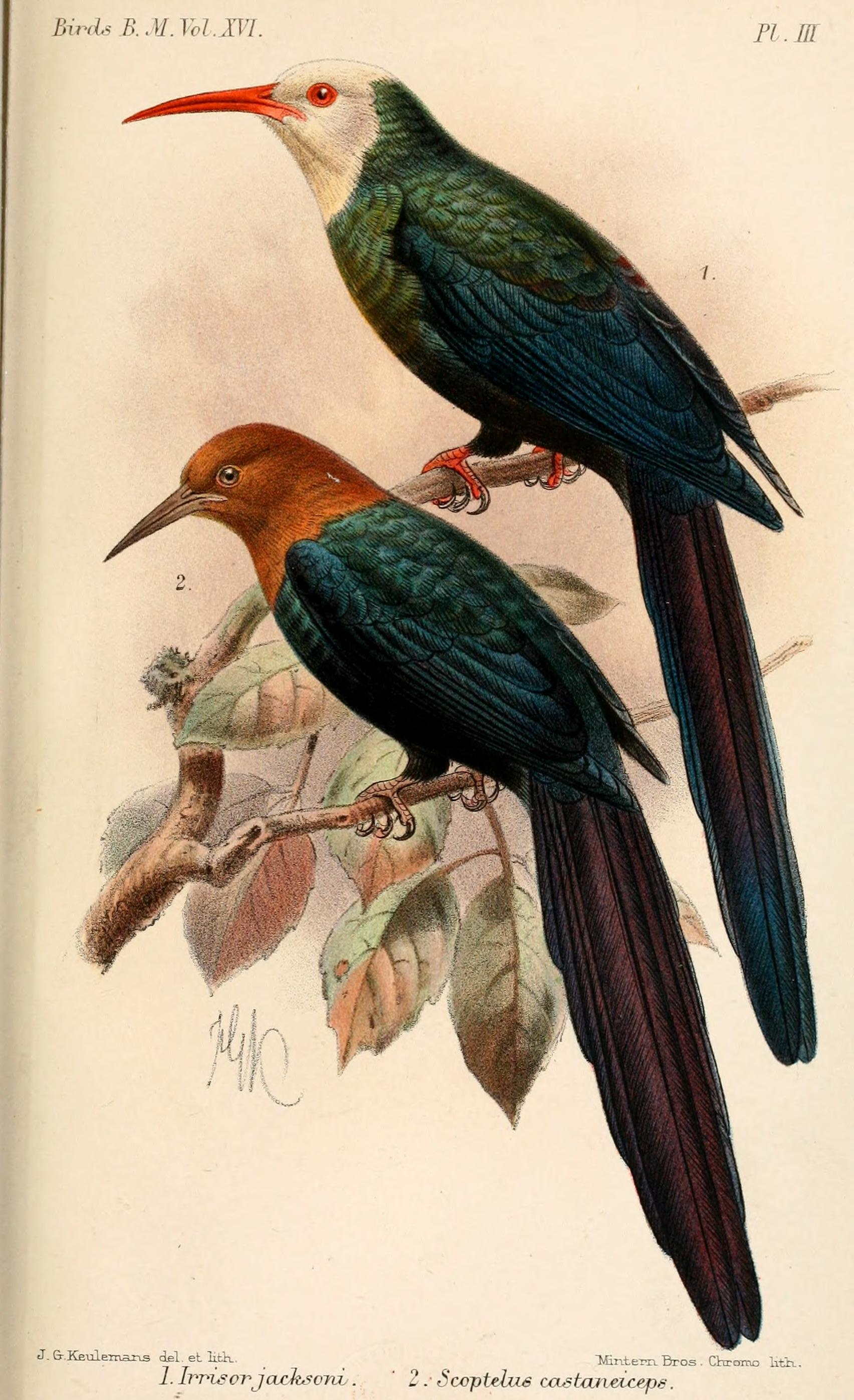
Irrisor jacksoni and Scoptelus castaneiceps

The following are cited in Keulemans & Coldewey's Feathers to Brush (unless noted with an asterisk).

- Annales des Sciences Naturelles. (one volume)
- Annali del Museo Civico, Series 2, Volume 4 [1887].*
- Aquila (two volumes)
- Bird Notes. (Volume 4).
- *Bulletin of the Liverpool Museum, vol. II.
- Catalogue of the Birds in the British Museum
- The Emu. (three volumes, 1907–1910)
- The Ibis, [1869–1909]
- Journal fur Ornithologie [1895]
- Journal of the Asiatic Society of Bengal (two volumes)*
- Journal of the Linnean Society (one volume)*
- Mittheilungen aus dem K[oniglichen] Zoologischen Museum zu Dresden. Heft III, 1878.
- Nouvelles Archives du Museum d'histoire naturelles.
- Novitates Zoologicae [1894–1909, 1911]
- Proceedings and Transactions of the New Zealand Institute, vol. VI.*
- Proceedings of the Zoological Society of London
- Quarterly Magazine of the High Wycombe Natural History Society. (one volume)
- Stray Feathers; Volume X, 1887.
- Transactions of the Linnean Society (three volumes)
- Transactions of the Zoological Society of London
- Anderson, John. Anatomical and zoological researches: comprising an account of the zoological results of the two expeditions to Western Yunnan in 1868 and 1875 and a monograph of the two cetacean genera, Platanista and Orcella. 1878 (Aves, Mammalia)
- Blanford, William Thomas. Observations on the Geology and Zoology of Abyssinia, made during the progress of the British Expedition to that country in 1867—68. 1870.
- Blanford, William Thomas. Eastern Persia: An Account of the Journeys of the Persian Boundary Commission 1870—71—72. Vol. II; The Zoology and Geology. Volume II (1876).
- Blanford, William Thomas, and Sharpe, R(ichard) B(owdler), Scientific Results of the Second Yarkand Mission. (Mammalia, 1879; Aves, 1891).
- Barboza du Bocage, J(ose) V(icente). Ornithologie d'Angola. 2 volumes, 1877–1881.
- Buller, Walter Lawry. History of the birds of New Zealand. 1873 (premier edition).
- Buller, Walter Lawry. History of the birds of New Zealand: Second Edition Supplement. 1905–1906
- Crawshay, Richard. The Birds of Tierra del Fuego. 1907.
- Dixon, Charles. Our Rarer Birds. 1888.
- Dresser, Henry Eeles. History of the Birds of Europe. 1871–1881. 8v.
- Dresser, Henry Eeles. History of the Birds of Europe: Supplement (1895—1896).
- Dresser, Henry Eeles. Monograph of the Coraciidae.
- Dresser, Henry Eeles. Monograph of the Meropidae.
- Elliot, Daniel Giraud. Monograph of the Bucerotidae.
- Elliot, Daniel Giraud. Monograph of the Phasianidae.
- Elliot, Daniel Giraud. Monograph of the Pittidae.
- Godman, Frederick Du Cane. Monograph of the Petrels. 5 fascicles, 1907–1910.
- Godman, Frederick Du Cane. Biologia Central-Americana. (Aves, Mammalia).
- Guillemard, Cruise of the Marchesa, 2v. 1 plate in each.
- Harvie-Brown, J. A. A Vertebrate Fauna of Sutherland.
- Henderson, George, and Hume, Allan O(ctavian). Lahore to Yarkand. Incidents of the route and Natural History of the countries traversed by the expedition of 1870, under T. D. Forsyth, Esq., C.B. 1873.
- James, Frank Linsly. The Unknown Horn of Africa. 1888.
- Keulemans, John Gerrard. Onze Vogels in huis en tuin.
- Keulemans, John Gerrard. Natural History of the Cage-Birds. 1871.
- Koslow, Piotr Kuz'mich, and Bianchi V(alentin). Mongoliia i Kam : trudy Ekspeditsii Imperatorskago Russkago geograficheskago obshchestva, sovershennoi v. Volume V, 1907.
- Layard, Edgar Leopold. Birds of South Africa, revised edn.
- Legge, W(illiam) V(incent), History of the birds of Ceylon. 1880.
- LILFORD, Thomas Littleton Powys (1833–1896). Coloured Figures of the Birds of the British Islands. London: R.H. Porter, 1885–1897
- Macpherson, H. A. Birds of Cumberland.
- Marshall, C(harles) H(enry) T(illson), and Marshall, G(eorge) F(rederick) L(eycester). Monograph of the Capitonidae. 1870–1871.
- Mathews, Gregory M(acalister). Birds of Australia (vols. 1–4).
- Melliss, John Charles. St. Helena: A Physical, Historical, and Topographical Description of the Island, Including Its Geology, Fauna, Flora, and Meteorology. 1875.
- Milne-Edwards, Alphonse. Mission Scientifique du Cap Horn; Mammiferes. 1891.
- Mitchell, F(rederick) S(haw). The Birds of Lancashire. 1885 (premier edn.)
- Mivart, George St. Jackson. Dogs, Jackals, Wolves, and Foxes. 1890.
- Mivart, George St. Jackson. Monograph of the Lories. 1893.
- Oates, C. G. Matabele land and the Victoria Falls : a naturalist's wanderings in the interior of South Africa. 1881 (premier edition).
- Oustalet, Emile. Mission Scientifique du Cap Horn; Aves. 1891.
- Pidsley, William E(lias) H(elman). The Birds of Devonshire. 1891.
- Rothschild, Lionel. Avifauna of Laysan. 1893.
- Rowley, George Dawson. Ornithological Miscellany. 1876–1878, three volumes.
- Sclater, Philip Lutley. Monograph of the Jacamars and Puff-birds. 1881.
- Sclater, Philip Lutley, and Hudson, Henry. Argentine Ornithology. 1888–1889, two volumes.
- Seebohm, Henry. Geographical Distribution of the Family Charadriidae. 1888.
- Seebohm, Henry, and Sharpe, R. B. Monograph of the Turdidae. 2vols.
- Sharpe, Richard Bowdler. Monograph of the Alcedinidae. 1868–1871.
- Sharpe, Richard Bowdler. Monograph of the Paradiseidae. 1891—1898.
- Shelley, George Ernest. Handbook of the Birds of Egypt. 1872.
- Shelley, George Ernest. Monograph of the Nectariniidae. (originally titled, Monograph of the Cinnyridae).
- Snelleman, Joh. F. (ed.). Bijdragen tot de Kennis der Fauna van Midden-Sumatra. (Deel IV/I {Fauna} in Veth, P. J., ed.: Midden-Sumatra. Reizen en onderzoekingen der Sumatra-Expeditie, uitgerust door het (Aardrijkskundig) Genootschap, 1877–1879, beschreven door de leden der Expeditie, onder toezicht van Prof. P. J. Veth.) 1887.
- Suchetet, Andre. Historie du Bimaculated Duck de Pennant. 1895.
- Tweeddale, Marquess of [(Hay, Arthur, formerly Viscount Walden)]. The Ornithological Works of Arthur, Ninth Marquess of Tweeddale. 1881.*
- Woodward, R. B., and Woodward, J. D. S. Natal Birds. 1899.

== See also ==
- List of wildlife artists

== Literature ==
- (in Dutch)Voous, K.H. (1995) – In de ban van vogels. Geschiedenis van de beoefening van de ornithologie in Nederland in de twintigste eeuw. Tevens Ornithologisch Biografisch Woordenboek. Uitg. Scheffers, Utrecht. 605 pags. ISBN 90 5546 013 3. pag. 299/300.
