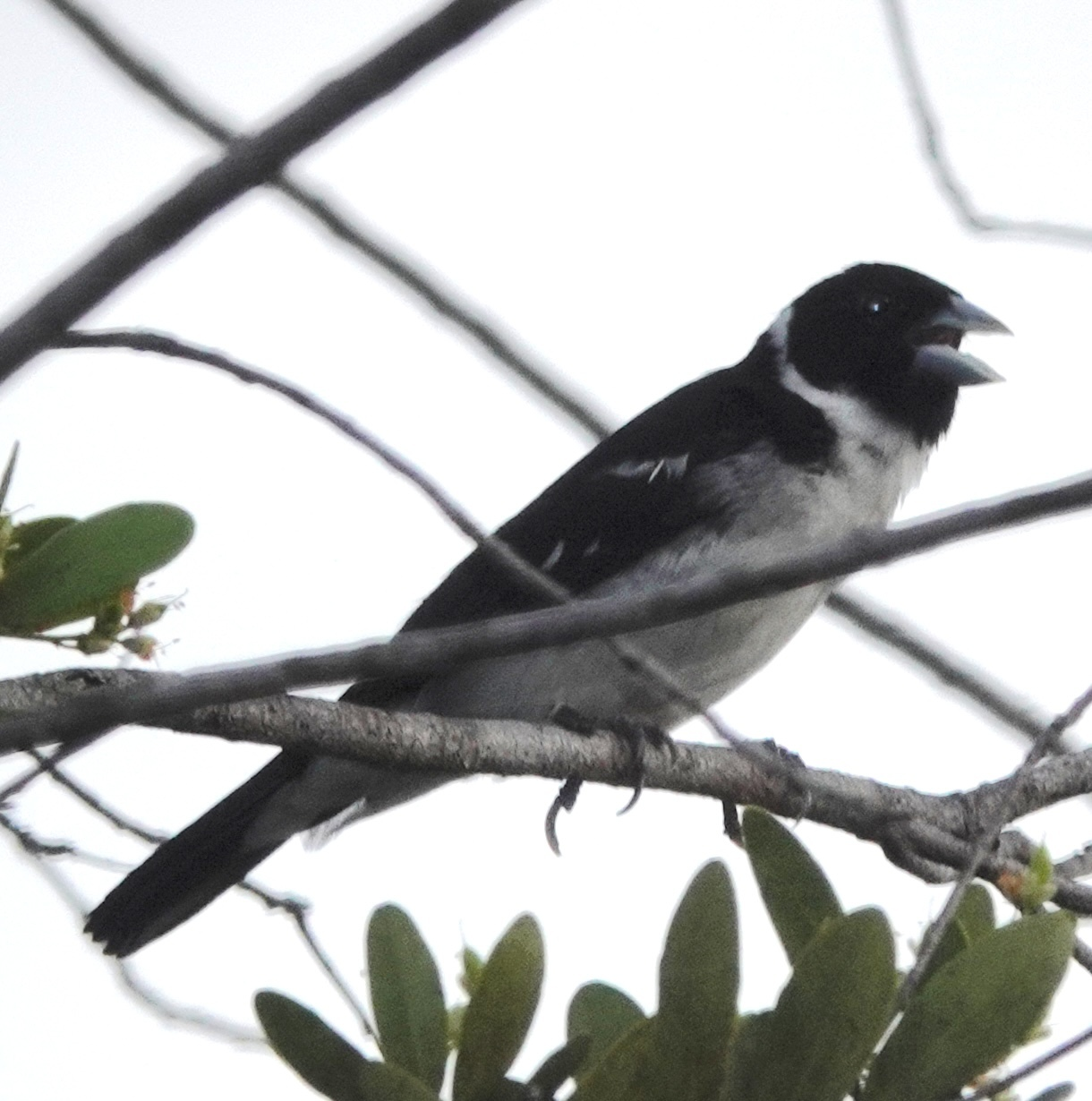

Conservation status
- Least Concern (IUCN 3.1)

Scientific classification
- Kingdom: Animalia
- Phylum: Chordata
- Class: Aves
- Order: Passeriformes
- Family: Thraupidae
- Genus: Sporophila
- Species: S. fringilloides

Binomial name
- Sporophila fringilloides (Pelzeln, 1870)

Synonyms
- See text

= White-naped seedeater =

Species of bird

The white-naped seedeater (Sporophila fringilloides) is a species of bird in the family Thraupidae, the tanagers and allies. It is found in Brazil, Colombia, Guyana, and Venezuela.

== Taxonomy and systematics ==
The white-naped seedeater has a complicated taxonomic history. It was formally described in 1870 with the binomial Oryzoburys ? fringilloides as a member of the family Fringillidae [The ? is in the original]. It later was reassigned as the only species in the genus Dolospingus and still in Fringillidae. By 1970 Dolospingus had been reassigned to the family Emberizidae. Beginning in 2014 Dolospingus was merged into the species' present genus Sporophila. Based on studies published between 1988 and 2011, beginning in 2012 Sporophila had been moved to its present position in the tanager family Thraupidae.

The white-naped seedeater is monotypic.

== Description ==
The white-naped seedeater is 13 to 13.5 cm (5.1 to 5.3 in) long; three males weighed an average of 12.7 g (0.45 oz) and 10 females 13.1 g (0.46 oz). It is slim, with a longish tail, and has a large, sharp, triangular bill. The species is sexually dimorphic. Adult males have a black head with a white collar below the nape. Their upperparts are mostly black with a white rump. Their wings are mostly black with white median coverts, white tips on the greater coverts, and white bases on the primaries. The white median coverts show as a bold wing bar and the greater covert tips as a smaller one; the white of the primaries is seldom visisble. Their tail is black. Their throat is black and the rest of their underparts mostly white with a small black wedge on the side of the breast, pale grayish sides, and pale grayish flanks with faint blackish blotches. Adult females have a dull brown head, upperparts, wings, and tail. Their throat, breast, and flanks are brownish, their belly whitish, and their undertail coverts buffy. Juveniles resemble adult females. Both sexes have a brown or dark brown iris. Males have an ivory to light blue bill and gray or dark gray legs; females have a gray bill and grayish black or gray-brown legs.

== Distribution and habitat ==
The white-naped seedeater's primary range extends from Guaviare, Vaupes, and Guainia departments in southeastern Colombia east into south-central Amazonas state in southern Venezuela and very slightly into northwestern Brazil's Amazonas state. There are also scattered records further east in Brazil. A record in southern Guyana was announced in 2005.

The white-naped seedeater is primarily bird of forest on nutrient-poor white sand though it also is found along the edges of forest on richer soils and in grassy savanna. It favors landscapes with much large-leafed herbaceous plants and terrestrial arums. In elevation it reaches 250 m (800 ft) in Colombia and Brazil and 200 m (700 ft) in Venezuela.

== Behavior ==
=== Movement ===
As far as is known the white-naped seedeater is a year-round resident, though there is speculation that it moves between patches of suitable habitat.

=== Feeding ===
The white-naped seedeater apparently feeds primarily on seeds, though insects and mistletoe (Loranthaceae) berries are also part of its diet. It typically forages singly or in pairs and rarely with other species. It has been observed foraging up to about 4 m (13 ft) above the ground.

=== Breeding ===
The white-naped seedeater's breeding season in Guyana appears to span from August to April. Nothing else is known about the species' breeding biology.

=== Vocalization ===
The male white-naped seedeater's song is "oud, fast, and musical, with the notes arranged in sets of paired notes or triplets, ne-ne-ne, te-te-te, ge-ge-ge, jii-jii-jii, tuE tuE tuE... and abrupt changes between each pair or triplet". It sings several variants of the song. The species' call is "a sharp tzink!".

== Status ==
The IUCN has assessed the white-naped seedeater as being of Least Concern. Its population size is not known but is believed to be stable. No immediate threats have been identified. It is considered "local" in Colombia, "patchily distributed" in Venezuela, and "uncommon to rare" in Brazil. It occurs in a few protected areas. "Given this species’ habitat choice of white-sand forest, it should be monitored in case habitat fragmentation does begin to have adverse effects on its numbers."
