= Latvian Museum of Natural History =

Museum in Riga, Latvia

Coordinates: 56.9495°N 24.1182°E

- Latvijas Nacionālais dabas muzejs

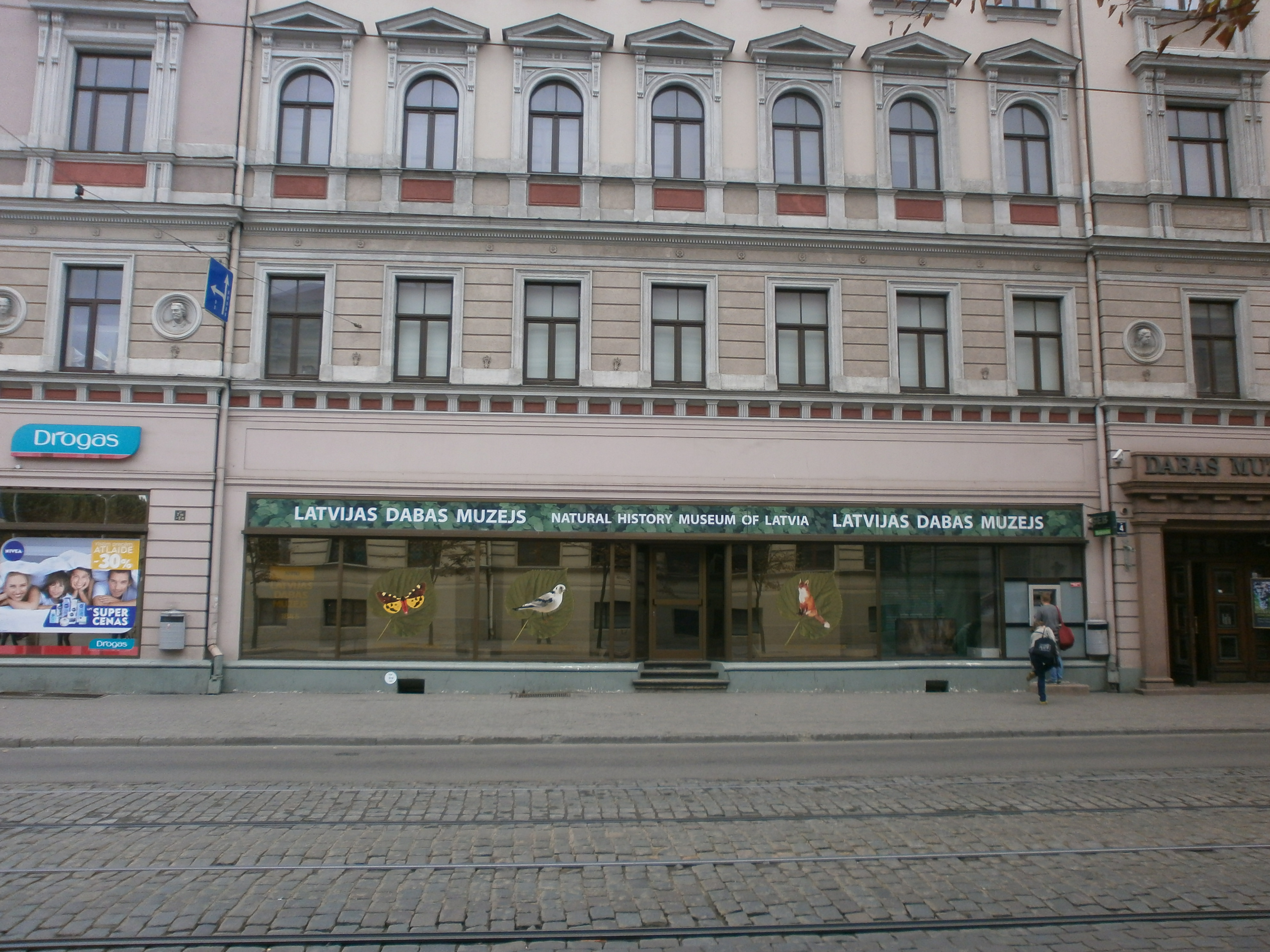
- Exhibition building
- Established: 1845
- Location: Krišjāna Barona iela 4, Rīga, Latvia
- Type: Natural history museum
- Collection size: 194 214 (2011)
- Director: Skaidrīte Ruskule
- Website: www.dabasmuzejs.gov.lv

The Latvian National Museum of Natural History (Latvian: Latvijas Nacionālais dabas muzejs) is a natural history museum in Riga, Latvia. It was founded in 1845 as the Riga Naturalist Society (German: Naturforscherverein zu Riga).

The museum contains the following Departments:

- Custodial
- Botany
- Zoology
- Geology and Palaeontology
- Technological Support
- Communications
- Administration
