= A History of the Birds of Europe =

Nine-volume, late 19th century book about the history of European birds

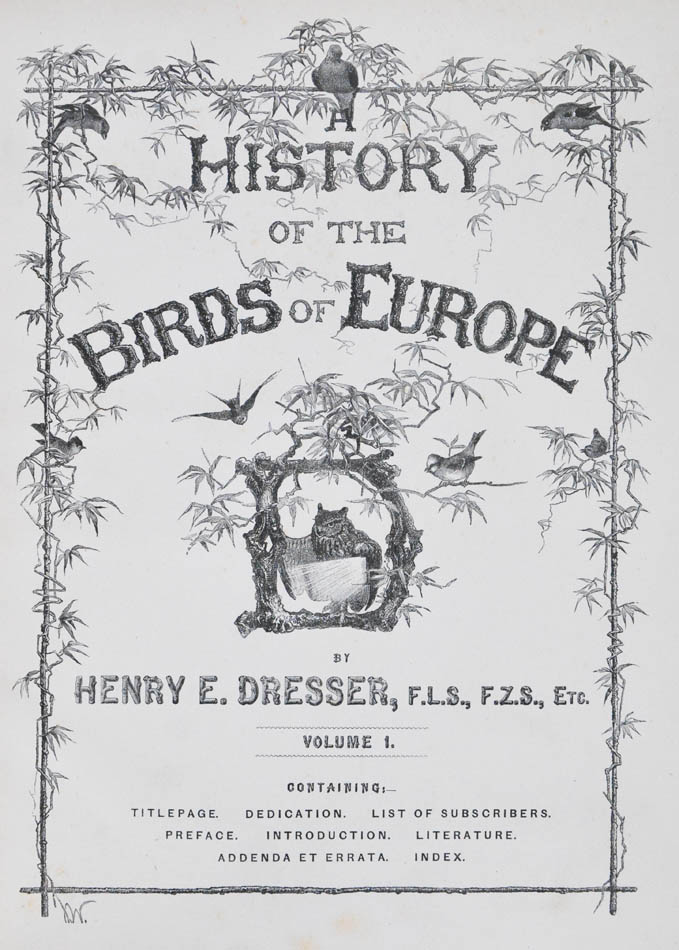
- Title page of volume 1
- Authors: Henry Eeles Dresser; Richard Bowdler Sharpe
- Illustrator: John Gerrard Keulemans
- Language: English
- Subject: Western Palaearctic ornithology
- Published: 1871–1896
- Publication place: United Kingdom
- Media type: Print
- OCLC: 7387434

A History of the Birds of Europe, Including all the Species Inhabiting the Western Palearctic Region is a nine-volume ornithological book published in parts between 1871 and 1896. It was mainly written by Henry Eeles Dresser, although Richard Bowdler Sharpe co-authored the earlier volumes. It describes all the bird species reliably recorded in the wild in Europe and adjacent geographical areas with similar fauna, giving their worldwide distribution, variations in appearance and migratory movements.

The pioneering ornithological work of John Ray and Francis Willughby in the seventeenth century had introduced an effective classification system based on anatomical features, and a dichotomous key to help readers identify birds. This was followed by other English-language ornithologies, notably John Gould's five-volume Birds of Europe published between 1832 and 1837. Sharpe, then librarian of the Zoological Society of London, had worked closely with Gould and wanted to expand on his work by including all species reliably recorded in Europe, North Africa, parts of the Middle East and the Atlantic archipelagos of Madeira, the Canary Islands and the Azores. He lacked the resources to undertake this task on his own, so he proposed to Dresser that they work together on this encyclopaedia, using Dresser's extensive collection of birds and their eggs and network of contacts.

The Birds of Europe was published as 84 quarto parts, each typically containing 56 pages of text and eight plates of illustrations, the latter mainly by the Dutch artist John Gerrard Keulemans, and bound into volumes when all the parts were published. 339 copies were made, at a cost to each subscriber of £52 10s. Sharpe did not contribute after part 13, and was not listed as an author after part 17. Birds of Europe was well received by its contemporary reviewers, although a commentator in 2018 considered that Dresser's outdated views and the cost of his books meant that in the long run his works had limited influence. The Birds of Europe continued a tradition dating from the seventeenth century whereby the study and classification of specimens operated largely independently of those field observers who studied behaviour and ecology, a rift that continued until the 1920s, when the German naturalist Erwin Stresemann integrated the two strands as part of modern zoology.

== Background ==
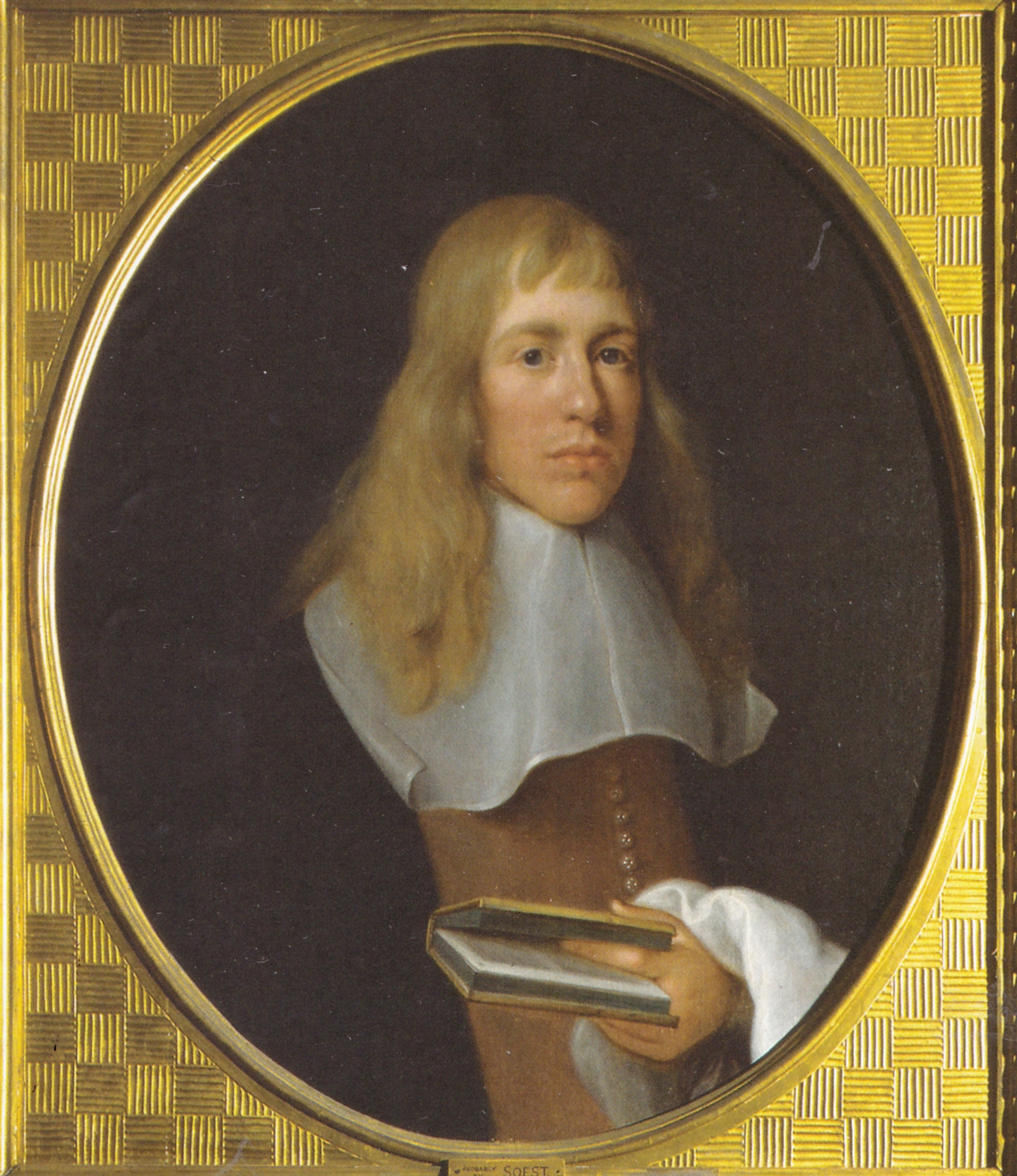
Francis Willughby by Gerard Soest

Early ornithologies, such as those of Conrad Gessner, Ulisse Aldrovandi and Pierre Belon, relied for much of their content on the authority of Aristotle and the teachings of the church, and included much extraneous material relating to the species, such as proverbs, references in history and literature, or its use as an emblem. The arrangement of the species was by alphabetical order in Gessner's Historia animalium, and by arbitrary criteria in most other early works. In the late sixteenth and early seventeenth centuries, Francis Bacon had advocated the advancement of knowledge through observation and experiment, and the English Royal Society and its members such as John Ray, John Wilkins and Francis Willughby sought to put the empirical method into practice, including travelling widely to collect specimens and information.

The first modern ornithology, intended to describe all the then-known birds worldwide, was produced by Ray and Willughby and published in Latin as Ornithologiae Libri Tres (Three Books of Ornithology) in 1676, and in English, as The Ornithology of Francis Willughby of Middleton, in 1678. Its innovative features were an effective classification system based on anatomical features, including the bird's beak, feet and overall size, and a dichotomous key, which helped readers to identify birds by guiding them to the page describing that group. The authors also placed an asterisk against species of which they had no first-hand knowledge, and were therefore unable to verify. The commercial success of the Ornithology is unknown, but it was historically significant, influencing writers including René Réamur, Mathurin Jacques Brisson, Georges Cuvier and Carl Linnaeus in compiling their own works.

During the early nineteenth century, a number of ornithologies were written in English, including John Gould's five-volume Birds of Europe, which was published between 1832 and 1837. Richard Bowdler Sharpe, then librarian of the Zoological Society of London, had worked closely with Gould and completed some of his books that were still unfinished when he died. He wished to build on Gould's work to include all species reliably recorded in the wild in Europe, expand the geographical range to include North Africa, parts of the Middle East and the Atlantic archipelagos of Madeira, the Canary Islands and the Azores (this extended area constitutes the Western Palaearctic realm) and to describe the worldwide distribution, variation and movements of each of the species. He lacked the resources to undertake this task on his own, so he proposed to businessman and amateur ornithologist Henry Eeles Dresser that they work together on this great encyclopaedia. Dresser had an extensive collection of European birds and their eggs, and a network of contacts who would allow him to acquire or borrow new specimens. He also had the linguistic skills to translate texts from several European languages.

== Dresser and bird collecting ==
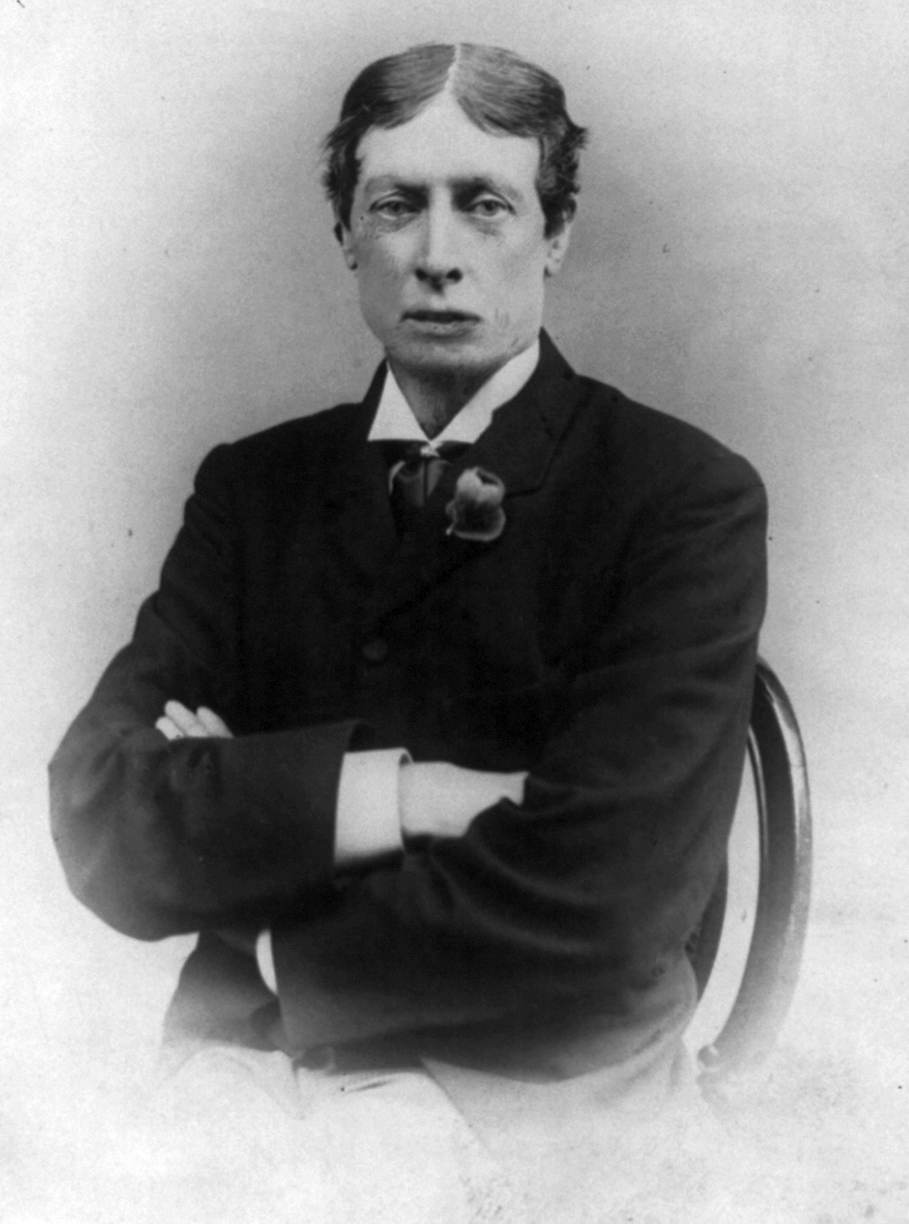
Henry Eeles Dresser c. 1900 (Note: Dresser is wearing a wig, as he did for most of his life, having lost all the hair from his head and body due to alopecia universalis when he was aged 32.)

In an age before modern cameras and binoculars, nineteenth century ornithology was dominated by the collection of eggs taken from the nest and birds obtained through shooting. The corpses were skinned, preserved with arsenical soap, (Note: Arsenical soap is typically a mixture of arsenic trioxide, soap, potassium carbonate, camphor and powdered lime.) and sometimes stuffed for display. Ornithologists acquired birds and eggs through their own shooting and collecting activities, by purchases from bird markets, auctions and commercial dealers, and through exchanges with other collectors.

Henry Dresser's father, also named Henry, was a successful timber merchant, and sent his son to a school in Ahrensburg near Hamburg to learn German, and another in Gefle (now Gävle) to study Swedish. Henry junior also acquired fluency in Danish, Finnish, French and Norwegian. (Note: Not Russian, although that is sometimes claimed.) Between 1856 and 1862, the younger Dresser's work sent him to Finland on three occasions and to New Brunswick twice, giving him the opportunity to add birds and eggs from these regions to his collection. On his second trip to Finland he became the first person to find a nest and eggs of the waxwing, which helped to establish his reputation as a serious ornithologist.

In 1863 and 1864, during the American Civil War, Dresser travelled to North America, setting up shop in the Mexican border town of Matamoros, Tamaulipas, to sell goods that had evaded the Union blockade to the Confederacy. (Note: The Union Navy could not interfere with foreign vessels trading with neutral Mexico, and since Matamoros was on the Rio Grande opposite Brownsville, Texas, it was a convenient "backdoor" into the Confederacy.) He made the most of the opportunity to add to his bird collection while there, as he did later when he relocated to San Antonio, Texas, where he met the prominent American ornithologist Adolphus Lewis Heermann.

Dresser's contacts for acquiring and exchanging specimens included Robert Swinhoe in China, who had 4,000 skins of 600 species, Thomas Blakiston in Japan, Allan Octavian Hume in India, whose 80,000 skins and 20,000 eggs were the world's largest private collection at the time, and William Blandford, a naturalist and geologist working in Persia and Central Asia. He also collaborated with prominent Russians including Nikolay Przhevalsky, Nikolai Severtzov and Sergei Buturlin. (Note: The scale of collecting is illustrated by Buturlin's expedition to Kolyma, Siberia, 1905–1906, from which he brought back 2000 bird skins, 500 eggs and thousands of insect and plant specimens.) African specimens came from a variety of sources, including colonial administrators and the collections of the Germans Wilhelm Friedrich Hemprich and Christian Gottfried Ehrenberg. Alfred Newton gave his friend Dresser access to a collection of birds from Lapland. By 1868, Dresser owned 1,200 skins and several thousand eggs. His final collection, including about 10,000 skins, is now kept at Manchester Museum, and includes the only known egg of the now-extinct slender-billed curlew.

== Production ==
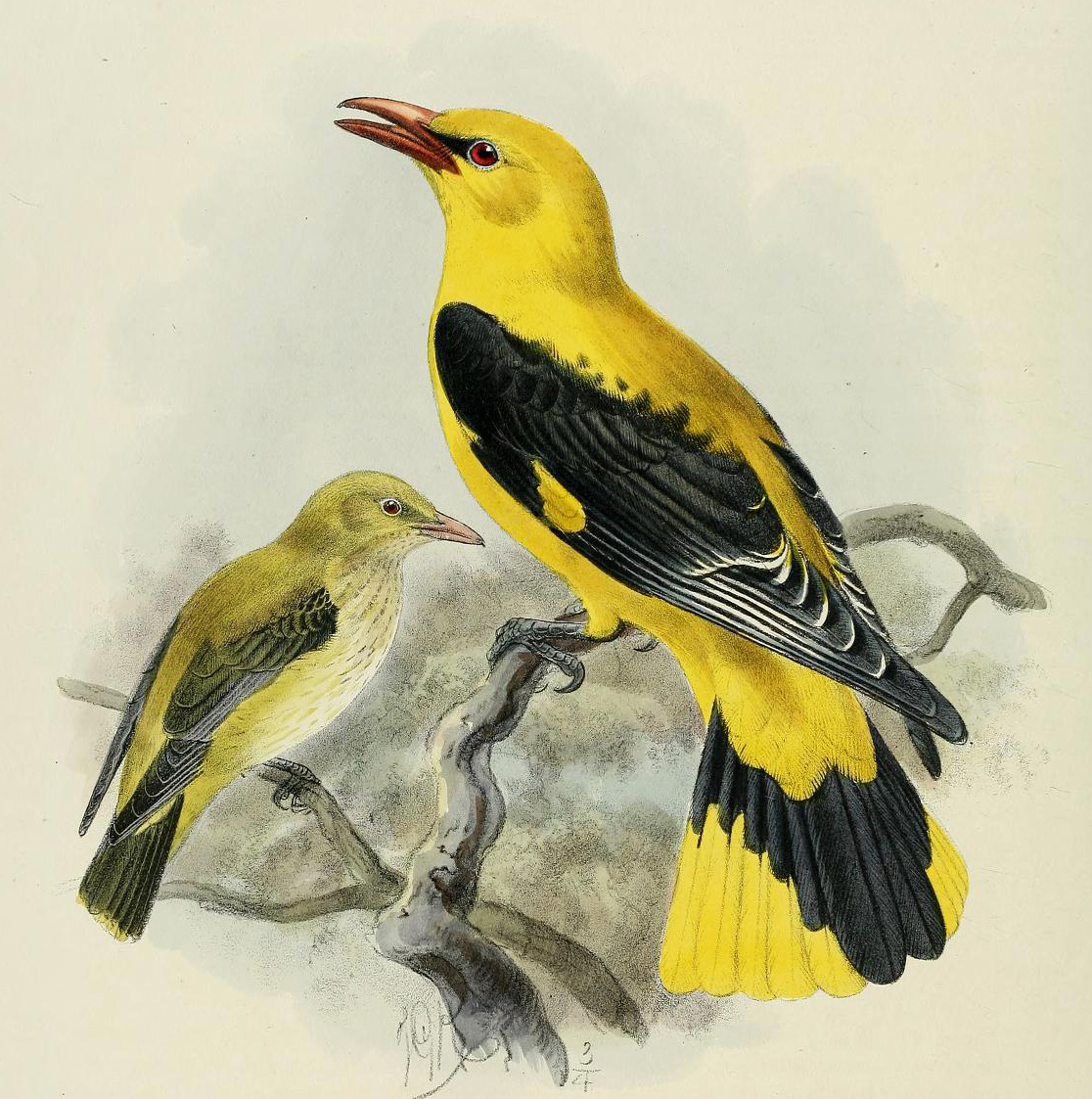
Golden oriole by John Gerrard Keulemans, from volume 3, plate 144

The Birds of Europe was published as 84 quarto parts between 1871 and 1896. Each part on average contained 56 pages of text and eight plates of illustrations, and took about seven weeks to produce. This meant that for the 11-year duration of the project, Dresser was writing around a page of text a day on top of his commercial employment, and the main illustrator, John Gerrard Keulemans, was drawing a plate every six days. The publication was financed by subscription, and a year's set of 12 issues cost £6 6s; (Note: About £670 at December 2025 prices calculated using Bank of England calculator) It was promoted by a prospectus containing sample articles that was sent to potential buyers using the authors' contacts in the scientific societies, including the Zoological Society of London and the British Ornithologists' Union (BOU). By the end of the first year, there were 237 subscribers, including King Victor Emmanuel II of Italy, Alfred, Duke of Saxe-Coburg and Gotha (by then also Duke of Edinburgh), and the Sikh Maharaja Duleep Singh.

The text and illustrations for the main text and supplement were self-published and printed by Taylor & Francis of Fleet Street, London. The twelve parts issued each year were bound into temporary volumes, and when all the parts were finally published they were permanently bound into seven volumes using Morocco leather with gold tooling. Parts 83 and 84, containing an introduction, index, references and list of subscribers, were bound as a slim Volume 1, and the 1895–1896 supplement to the main text eventually became a ninth volume.

The complete set's final cost was £52 10s, equivalent to about £6,100 at 2025 values. Of the 339 copies, 69 were bought by naturalists, 31 by aristocrats, 229 by other private individuals, 67 by dealers and the rest by museums and other institutions. Overseas subscribers accounted for 61 of the purchased sets. Dresser gave 20 further sets, printed on thinner paper and without the plates of illustrations, to those who had contributed information.

=== Text ===
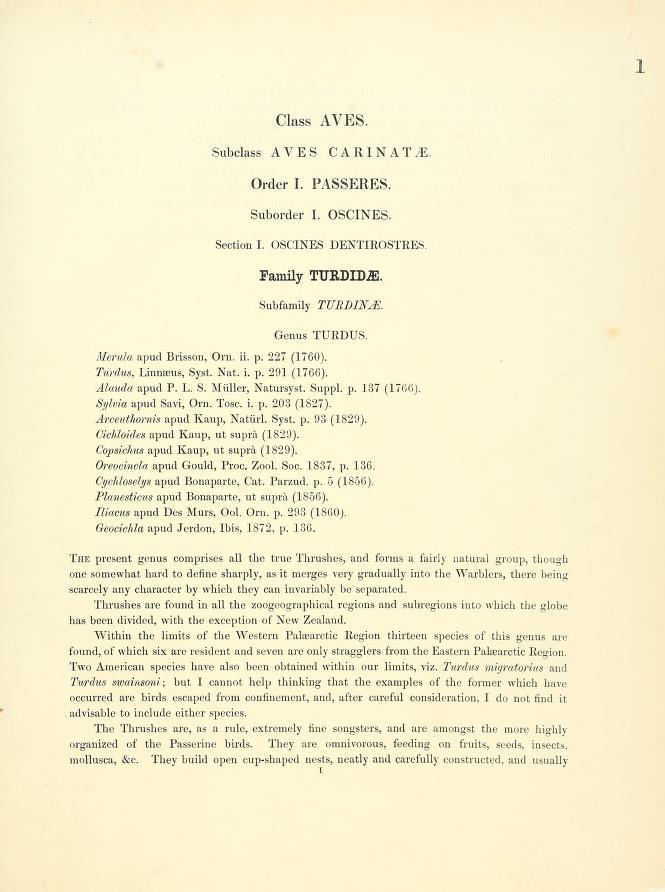
The mistle thrush in volume 2, page 1

Each part of the book contained birds from different families to prevent subscribers attempting to collect only a particularly popular group, such as birds of prey or ducks, the different families coming together only when the articles and plates were reorganised in the final binding. The first part released therefore included birds as diverse as the Eurasian teal, red-footed falcon, marsh sandpiper and woodchat shrike. Articles for each species included alternative binomial names, a detailed description of both sexes and the juveniles, the bird's range, habitat and habits, and the specimens that had been examined during preparation of the text.

The taxonomy used by Dresser was based on a scheme created by Thomas Henry Huxley and developed by Philip Sclater which used a hierarchical classification using orders and families rather than the arbitrary division into bird groups used by earlier writers. His book started with the passerines, rather than the traditional birds of prey.

When choosing binomial names for his species, Dresser kept strictly to chronological priority. Since the first mention might be in an obscure or foreign language journal, this led to changes in the established Latin names of some species, "causing great consternation among his colleagues". The situation was made worse in that many early descriptions were so vague it was impossible to be sure of the species. Dresser introduced five new names. Parus grisescens (Siberian tit), Calandrella baetica (Mediterranean short-toed lark), Serinus canonicus (Syrian serin) and Anthus seebohmi (Pechora pipit) are now considered to be junior synonyms for the species, and Otocorys brandti is now Eremophila alpestris brandti, a subspecies of the horned lark.

Dresser and Sharpe initially co-authored the articles, both struggling to keep up to schedule since they were also working full-time. Sharpe resigned as librarian of the Zoological Society late in 1871 to give himself more opportunity to write, but then accepted a post as bird curator at the British Museum in May 1872. His contract meant he was not allowed to have a personal collection, so he sold his skins of African birds to the Museum. Relations between the two authors soon became strained, Sharpe considering that his colleague was too interested in the commercial aspects of the project, rather than the science, and their partnership was dissolved in December 1872. Sharpe did not contribute after part 13, and was not listed as an author after part 17.

A supplement to the Birds of Europe was published in nine parts in 1895 and 1896, giving a final count of more than 5,100 pages and 723 plates. The Supplement covered 114 further species, including 14 discovered since the earlier publication, 22 rare vagrants to Europe and 26 that had been elevated to full species status in the interim. Dresser had also extended the area covered beyond Europe and the Middle East to include neighbouring Persia and western Central Asia, which added many birds from that region.

=== Illustrations ===
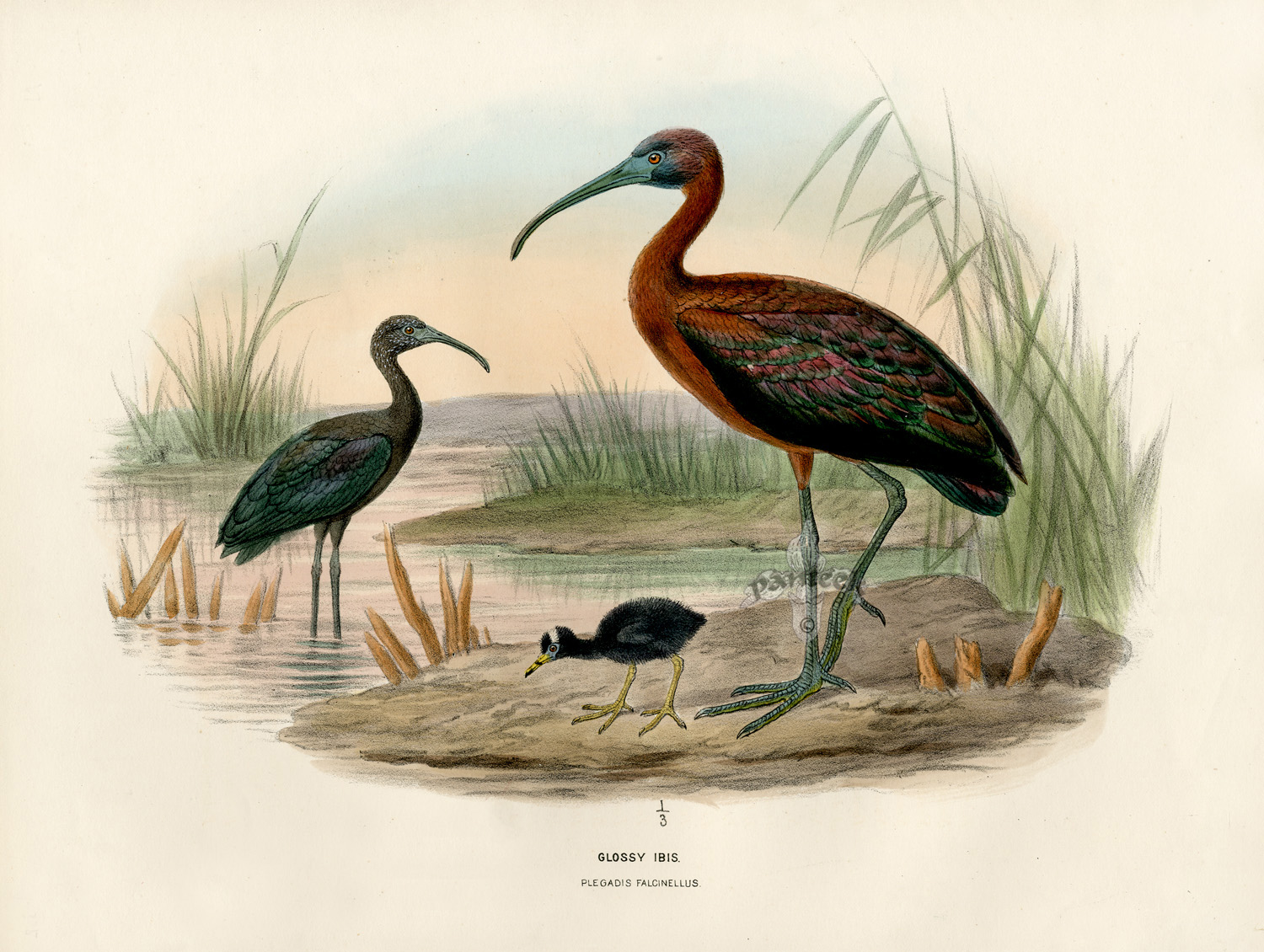
Glossy ibis by Keulemans from volume 6, plate 409

The principal illustrator was the Dutch artist John Gerrard Keulemans, who had previously illustrated Sharpe's study of kingfishers, A Monograph of the Alcdinidae. Keulemans mostly worked from skins rather than life, but attempted to depict the birds realistically. Artists normally painted a picture and then copied it onto a fine limestone slab using a special waxy crayon. The slab was then wetted before adding an oil-based ink, which would be held only by the greasy crayon lines, and copies were printed from the slab. This process was known as lithography.

To reduce costs, Keulemans drew directly on to the limestone instead of first making a painting. Although this was more technically difficult, drawing directly could give a livelier feel to the final illustration, and was also favoured by other contemporary bird artists such as Edward Lear. The printed plates were hand-coloured, mainly by young women.

Keulemans was also working on other projects, so Dresser had to commission Edward Neale and Joseph Wolf to draw 28 and 15 plates respectively. Each of the 339 copies produced contained 633 plates, so nearly 215,000 plates were individually coloured. In addition to the colour plates, there were also monochrome engravings to illustrate interesting features, one example being a drawing of a skull of a Tengmalm's owl to show its asymmetry. (Note: Most owls, unlike other birds, have ear openings that are asymmetric in shape or position to help them locate the source of a sound at night. In the Tengmalm's owl genus Aegolius, the openings are identical but the skull itself is not symmetrical.)

== Reception ==
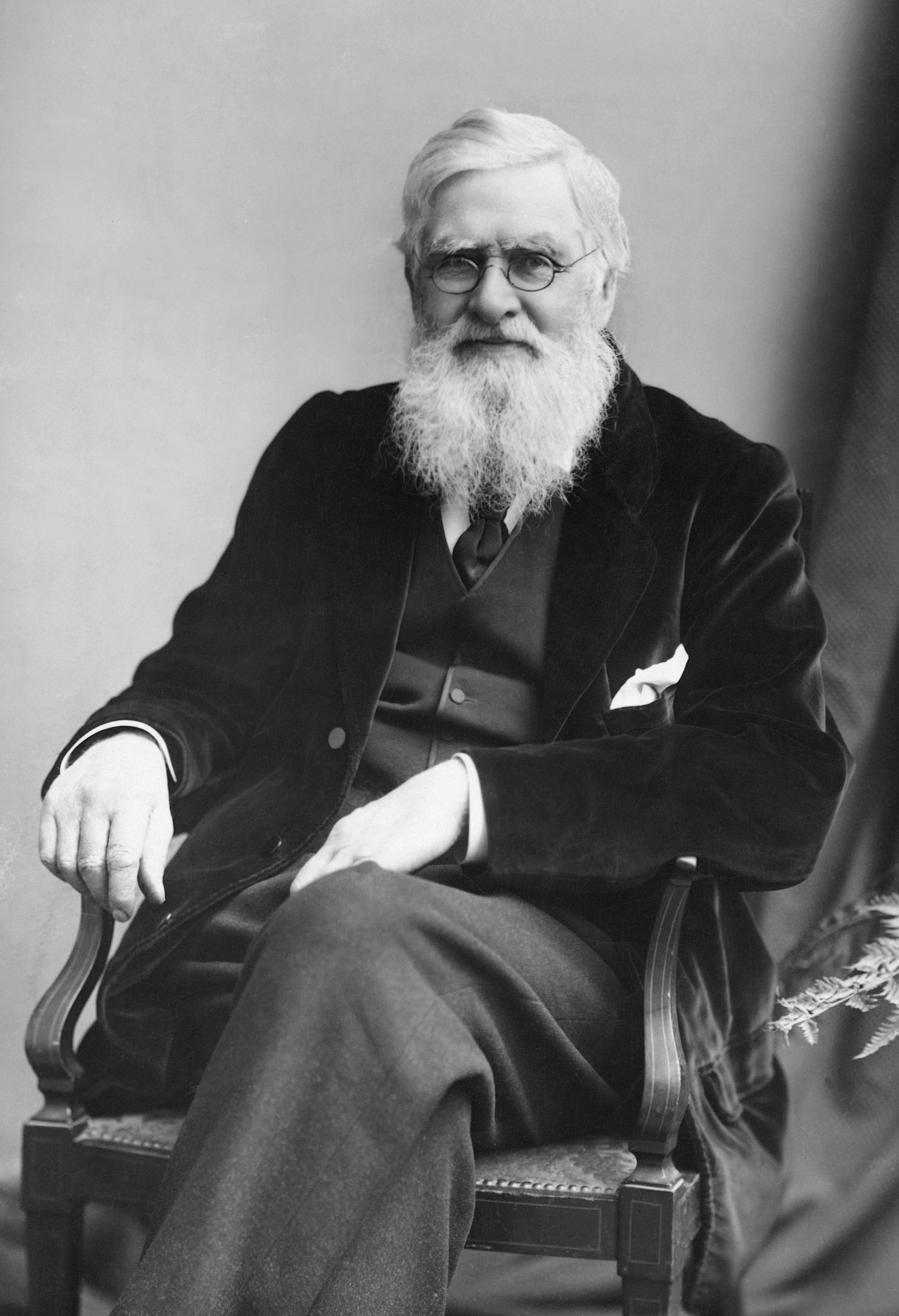
Alfred Russel Wallace, an old friend of Dresser

When he came to review Birds of Europe in 1872, Dresser's old friend Alfred Russel Wallace recommended the work both to general readers and to amateurs, using the latter word in its original sense as a lover of the subject. In another review in 1875, he said "this beautiful and important work ... The energy with which the author has laboured to ensure punctuality in the issue is beyond all praise; and now that about half the work is completed, and we find that the last twelve parts, with figures of nearly 120 species of birds, have appeared within the year, subscribers have every assurance that they will, in due course, possess a finished work."

An outspoken critic of the book was Dresser's former friend, the ornithologist Henry Seebohm, who criticised the errors in the text and the conservatism of the authors, including their failure to use trinomial nomenclature. Seebohm was a much more committed supporter of evolutionary theory than Dresser, and believed every local variation of a species should have its own scientific name to demonstrate relationships. His comments on Dresser and Sharpe include:

... the writer of the extraordinary article in question was absolutely ignorant of everything connected with the Greenshank except the information which a series of skins might afford ... Articles of this kind are very amusing, but they must sorely puzzle the young student – though in most cases his bird-stuffer, even if he be only a country barber, will be quite capable of correcting such childish blunders.

and

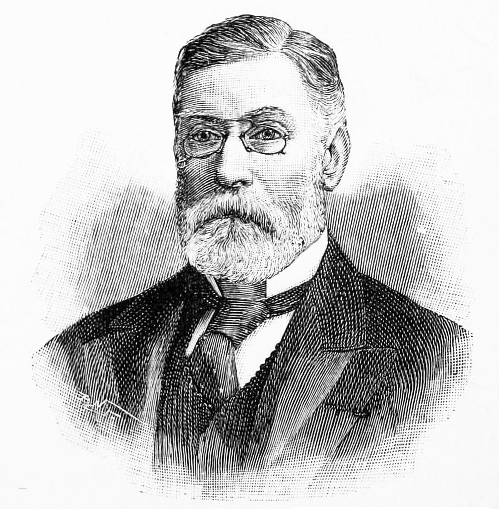
Henry Seebohm, a critic of Dresser's works

... as acts of ignorance and folly on the part of two juvenile ornithologists who had nothing new to say on the birds of which they wrote, and consequently made a desperate effort to achieve notoriety by introducing novelties into nomenclature ... I think we all owe a debt of gratitude to these two gentlemen who thus heroically sacrificed their reputation for common sense and sound judgment for the good of the science they loved. (Note: At the date of completion, Dresser was aged 44 and Sharpe 33; Seebohm was 50.)

Overall, Birds of Europe was very well received by its contemporary reviewers, as was the Supplement when it was published. When Dresser died in 1915 aged 77 his obituary in Ibis, an avian science journal, after summarising his life and his major role in scientific societies, went on to say his "most important work is undoubtedly the well-known 'History of the Birds of Europe' ... the whole forms a monument of the industry and accuracy of the author." His obituarist, though, added a caveat that "his views on the limits of specific variation and nomenclature would not perhaps commend themselves to present-day workers."

== Legacy ==
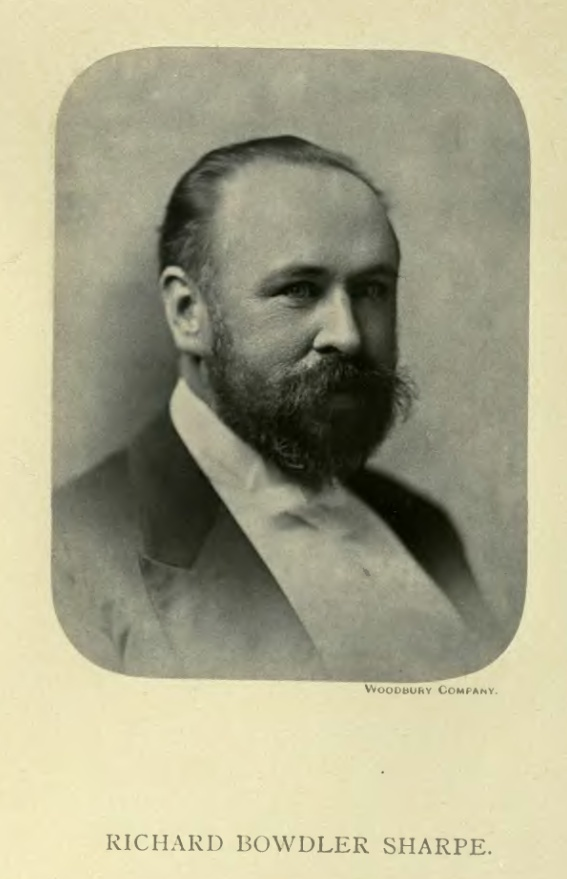
Richard Bowdler Sharpe, co-author of the earlier issues

The Birds of Europe continued a tradition dating from Ray's time whereby the study and classification of specimens operated largely independently of those observers who studied behaviour and ecology. The rift between the "museum men" and field ornithologists continued until the 1920s, when the German naturalist Erwin Stresemann integrated the two traditions as part of modern zoology.

The ornithologist Alan Knox commented in 2018 that Dresser's outdated classification scheme and the cost of his books meant that, in the long run, his works were less influential than William Yarrell's 1843 A History of British Birds. Eventually Dresser's "old guard" views fell out of favour, particularly after World War I, although his book still attracts the interest of collectors, with first-edition full sets being offered in late 2019 for $27,500 in the US and £19,642 in the UK.

Although Sharpe's contribution to the Birds of Europe was limited, his involvement facilitated his move to the British Museum and his main work was in classifying and cataloguing the bird collections. He also used his contacts to acquire the egg and skin collections of wealthy collectors and travellers for his museum. When he was appointed in 1872 the museum had 35,000 bird specimens, but had grown to half a million items by the time of his death.

== Related works ==
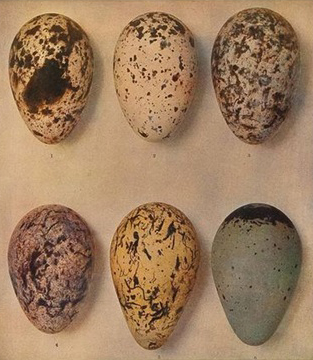
Razorbill and guillemot eggs from The Eggs of the Birds of Europe Plate CLXXVlll

Throughout his adult life Dresser regularly wrote articles for journals, most frequently The Zoologist and Proceedings of the Zoological Society of London, although the History of the Birds of Europe was his first book. He wrote several other ornithological works, namely A Monograph of the Meropidae, or Family of the Bee-eaters (1884–1886), A Monograph of the Coraciidae, or Family of the Rollers (1893), the two-volume A Manual of Palaearctic Birds (1902–1903) and the two-volume Eggs of the Birds of Europe (1910), which was issued in 24 parts beginning in 1905.

He had started on the bee-eater monograph in 1882, using his own collection of 200 skins of these birds as one of his sources, and by 1883 he was also working on the rollers, adding Birds of Europe to his workload in the following year. The 1881 A List of European Birds, including all species found in the western palaearctic region was based on the History of the Birds of Europe, and may have been a response to criticism from Sclater that the earlier publication was too large.

The Manual of Palaearctic Birds was largely traditional in its taxonomy, as with its predecessor, but in his treatment of dippers he showed a partial acceptance that subspecies could share a common ancestor, as proposed by Charles Darwin in The Origin of Species. In The Eggs of the Birds of Europe, Dresser used a then-new photographic technique, the three-colour process, to illustrate the subtleties of bird egg markings with colour photographs rather than paintings.

== Selected bibliography ==
- Dresser, Henry Eeles (1871–1896). A History of the Birds of Europe : including all the Species inhabiting the Western Palaearctic region. London: self-published. volume 1; volume 2; volume 3 volume 4; volume 5; volume 6; volume 7; volume 8; volume 9
- Dresser, Henry Eeles (1884–1886). A Monograph of the Meropidae, or Family of the Bee-eaters. London: self-published.
- Dresser, Henry Eeles (1891). A list of European birds, including all species found in the western palaearctic region. London: self-published.
- Dresser, Henry Eeles (1893). A Monograph of the Coraciidae, or Family of the Rollers. Kent, England: self-published.
- Dresser, Henry Eeles (1902–1903). A Manual of Palaearctic Birds. Vol. 1–2. London: self-published. Volume 1, Volume 2
- Dresser, Henry Eeles (1910). Eggs of the Birds of Europe, Including All the Species Inhabiting the Western Palaearctic Region. Vol. 1–2. London: self-published. volume 1 (text), volume 2 (plates and their keys) (issued in 24 parts beginning in 1905)
- Gessner, Conrad (1551). Historia Animalium Libri (in Latin). Vol. 1. Zurich: C. Froschauer.
- Gould, John (1832). Birds of Europe. Vol. 1. London: self-published.
- Willughby, Francis; Ray, John (1676). Ornithologiae Libri Tres (in Latin). London: John Martyn.
- Willughby, Francis; Ray, John (1678). The Ornithology of Francis Willughby of Middleton in the County of Warwick. London: John Martyn.
- Yarrell, William (1843). A History of British Birds. London: John Van Voorst.
