= Paolo Savi =

Italian geologist and ornithologist (1798–1871)

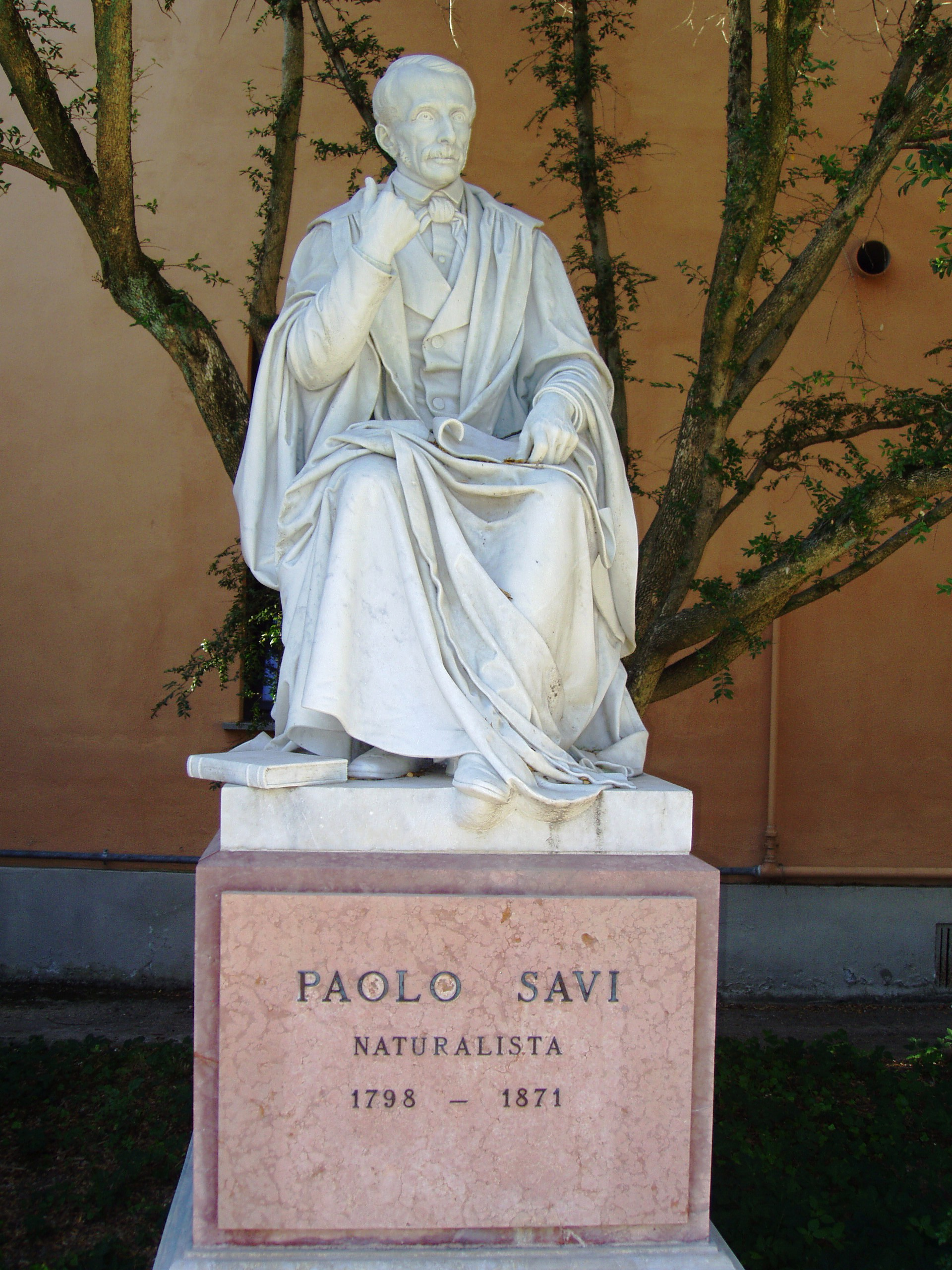
- Paolo Savi, memorial sculpture in the Orto botanico di Pisa
- Born: 11 July 1798; Pisa, Grand Duchy of Tuscany
- Died: 5 April 1871 (aged 72); Pisa, Kingdom of Italy
- Scientific career
- Notable students: Filippo Pacini

Paolo Savi (11 July 1798 – 5 April 1871) was an Italian geologist and ornithologist.

== Biography ==
Savi was born in Pisa, the son of Gaetano Savi, professor of botany at the University of Pisa. The younger Savi became assistant lecturer in zoology at the university in 1820, was appointed professor in 1823, and lectured also on geology. He devoted great attention to the museum of the university, the Natural History Museum of the University of Pisa, and formed one of the finest natural history collections in Europe.

Savi was regarded as the father of Italian geology. He studied the geology of it:Monti Pisani and the Apuan Alps, explaining the metamorphic origin of the Carrara marble; he also contributed essays on the Miocene strata and fossils of Monte Bamboli, the iron ores of Elba and other subjects. With Giuseppe Meneghini (1811–1889) he published memoirs on the stratigraphy and geology of Tuscany (1850–1851).

Savi also became eminent as an ornithologist, and was the author of Ornitologia Toscana (1827–1831) and Ornitologia Italiana (1873–1876). In the autumn of 1821 he obtained specimens of an unstreaked, dark, rufous-brown warbler which was new to science. He published a full description of the bird in 1824, and it became commonly known as Savi's warbler.

== Personal ==
Savi was buried in Pisa cemetery and his statue now stands in the Orto botanico di Pisa.

== Major works ==
- Osservazioni sopra la Blarta acervorum di panzee. Gryllus Myrmocophilus nob. Memoria (inedita) del dott. Paolo Savi, con tavola in rame, Biblioteca Italiana ossia Giornale di letteratura scienze ed arti (1819 ago), Volume 15, Fascicolo
- Sulla Salvinia natans. Memoria inedita del dottor Paolo Savi, aiuto del professore di botanica dell'università di Pisa, con tavola in rame, Biblioteca Italiana ossia Giornale di letteratura scienze ed arti (1820 dic, Volume 20, Fascicolo)
- Ornitologia Toscana, ossia descrizione e storia degli uccelli che trovansi nella Toscana con l'aggiunta delle descrizioni di tutti gli altri propri al rimanente d'Italia, 3 volumi (Pisa, Dalla tipografia Nistri 1827–1831). L'opera, di notevole importanza per la storia dell'ornitologia italiana, contiene 31 figure incise in rame. Venne ristampata postuma nel 1873 a Firenze (sempre in 3 voll.), con il titolo "Ornitologia italiana", a cura del figlio Adolfo. [Ornitologia italiana (opera postuma) Firenze :Successori Le Monnier, 1873-1876] online online at BHL
- Sul Mischio di Serravezza (Nuovo Giornale d. Lett., XX, Pisa 1830);
- Catalogo ragionato di una collezione geognostica contenente le rocce più caratteristiche della formazione del Macigno della Toscana, quelle di trabocco, cioè Dolomitiche, Porfiriche e Granitiche le quali hanno disordinato le stratificazioni delle prime e quelle alterate dal contatto delle straboccate (ibid., 1830);
- Carta geologica dei Monti Pisani levata dal vero (Pisa 1832);
- Tagli geologici delle Alpi Apuane e del Monte pisano e cenno sull’isola d’Elba (Nuovo Giornale d. Lett., XXVI, 1833);
- Sulla miniera di ferro dell’Isola d'Elba (ibid., XXXI, 1835);
- Sui terreni stratificati dipendenti o annessi alle masse serpentinose della Toscana (ibid., XXXIV e XXXV, 1837);
- Sui vari sollevamenti e abbassamenti che hanno dato alla Toscana l’attuale configurazione (ibid., XXXV, 1837);
- Del carbon fossile in Italia. Estratto dalla Memoria sulla Scorza del Globo Terrestre, del prof. P. Savi Annali universali di statistica economia pubblica, storia, viaggi e commercio (1838 apr, Serie 1, Volume 56, Fascicolo 166)
- Delle rocce ofiolitiche della Toscana e delle masse metalliche in esse contenute (ibid., 1839);
- Sopra i carboni fossili dei terreni miocenici della Maremma Toscana (Pisa 1843);
- Considerazioni geologiche sull'Appennino Pistoiese (Firenze 1845);
- Sulla catena metallifera delle Alpi Apuane e sulla costituzione geologica dei Monti Pisani (Pisa 1846);
- Considerazioni sulla geologia della Toscana, in collaborazione con G. Meneghini (Firenze 1851);
- Saggio sulla costituzione geologica della Provincia di Pisa (Statist. della provincia di Pisa, Pisa 1863).
