= Theodor von Heuglin =

19th-century German explorer and ornithologist

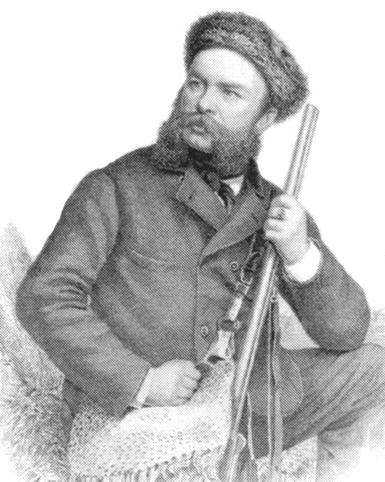
- Born: Martin Theodor von Heuglin; 20 March 1824
- Died: 5 November 1876 (aged 52)

Martin Theodor von Heuglin (20 March 1824 – 5 November 1876), was a German explorer and ornithologist. It is principally by his zoological, and more especially his ornithological, labours that Heuglin has taken rank as an independent authority.

== Early life, family and education ==
Heuglin was born in Hirschlanden (now part of Ditzingen) in Württemberg. His father was a Protestant pastor.

Heuglin was trained to be a mining engineer. He was ambitious, however, to become a scientific investigator of unknown regions, and with that object studied the natural sciences, especially zoology.

== Career ==
Heuglin travelled to Egypt in 1850 where he learnt Arabic. He visited the Red Sea and Sinai. In 1852 he accompanied Dr. Christian Reitz, Austrian consul at Khartoum, on a journey to Ethiopia. After Reitz's death, Heuglin was appointed his successor in the consulate. While he held this post, he travelled in Ethiopia and Kordofan, acquiring a valuable collection of natural history specimens. In 1857 he journeyed through the coast lands of the African side of the Red Sea, and along the Somali coast.

In 1860 Heuglin was chosen as leader of an expedition to search for Eduard Vogel. His companions including Werner Munzinger, Gottlob Kinzelbach, and Hermann Steudner. The party landed at Massawa in June 1861, having instructions to go direct to Khartoum and then to Ouaddai, where Vogel was thought to be detained. Accompanied by Hermann Steudner, Heuglin made a wide detour through Abyssinia and the Galla country. As a result, leadership of the expedition was taken from him. He and Steudner reached Khartoum in 1862 and there joined the party organized by Alexine Tinne and her mother Henriette Tinne-van Capellen, who then had just returned from a White Nile journey to Gondokoro. With both women and on their own account, they explored a great part of the Bahr-el-Ghazal, where Steudner died of fever on 10 April 1863 and Alexine's mother on 20 July.

After reaching Cairo with Alexine Tinne, Heuglin returned to Europe in February 1864. In 1870 and 1871 he made a valuable series of explorations in Spitsbergen and Novaya Zemlya. In 1875 he returned to northeast Africa, in the country of the Beni Amer and northern Abyssinia.

== Personal life and demise ==
As Heugline was preparing in Stuttgart for an exploration of the island of Socotra, he died.

== Works ==
- Systematische Übersicht der Vögel Nordost-Afrikas (Systematic Review of Northeastern-African Birds) (1855)
- Reisen in Nordost-Afrika, 1852–1853 (Travels in Northeast Africa, 1852–1853) (Gotha, 1857)
- Syst. Übersicht der Säugetiere Nordost-Afrikas (Systematic Review of Mammals of Northeast Africa) (Vienna, 1867)
- Reise nach Abessinien, den Gala-Ländern, &c., 1861–1862 (Trip to Abyssinia, the ??, etc., 1861–1862) (Jena, 1868)
- Reise in das Gebiet des Weissen Nil, &c. 1862–1864 (Trip to the White Nile and Environs, 1862–1864) (Leipzig, 1869)
- Reisen nach dem Nordpolarmeer, 1870–1871 (Trip to the Arctic Ocean, 1870–1871) (Brunswick, 1872–1874)
- Ornithologie von Nordost-Afrika (Ornithology of Northeast Africa) (Cassel, 1869–1875)
- Reise in Nordost-Afrika (A trip in Northeast Africa) (Brunswick, 1877, 2 vols).

== See also ==
- Taxa named by Theodor von Heuglin
