= Henry Eeles Dresser =

English businessman and ornithologist

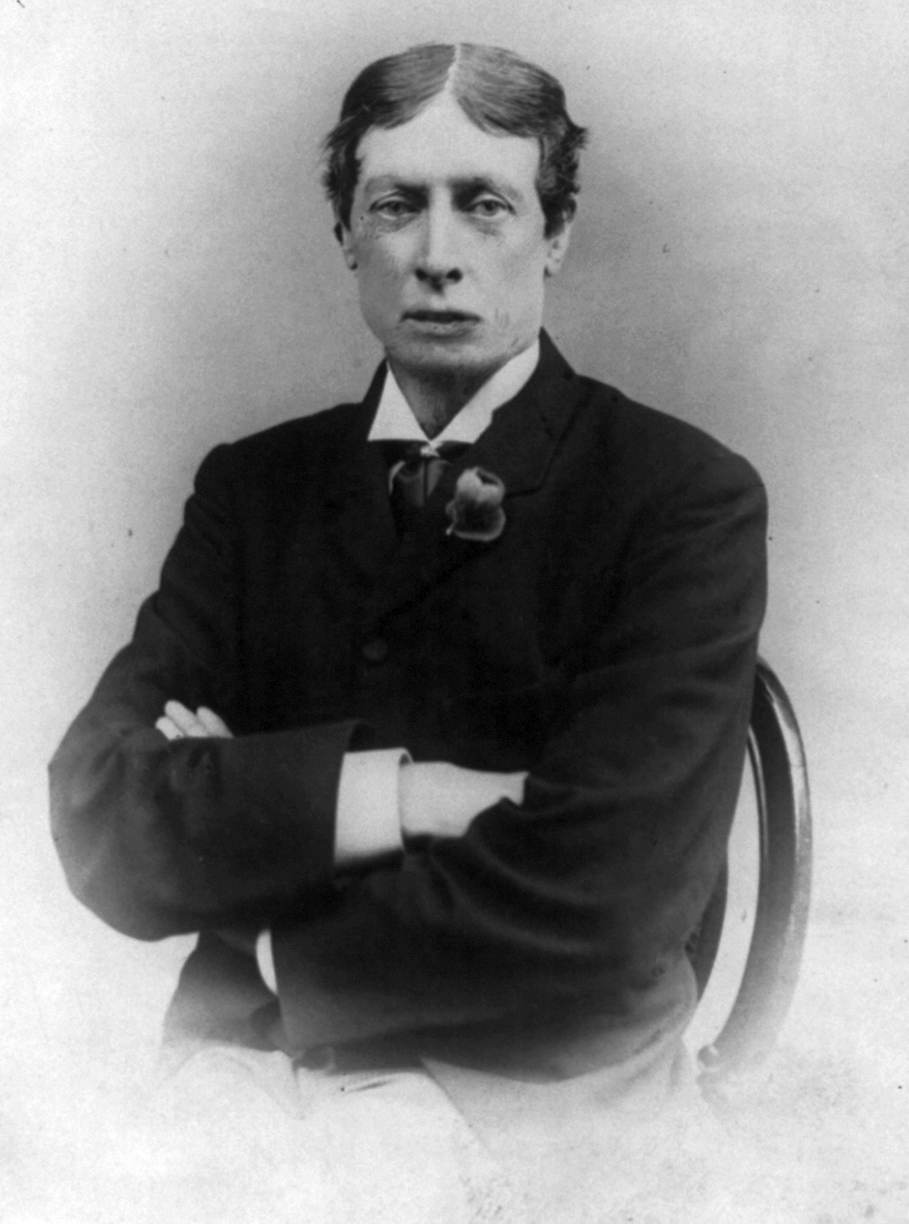
- Born: 9 May 1838; Thirsk, Yorkshire, England
- Died: 28 November 1915 (aged 77); Monte Carlo
- Occupations: Ornithologist and businessman
- Notable work: A History of the Birds of Europe
- Spouse: Eleanor Walmisley Hodgson (1854–1937) (m. 1878)
- Children: Henry Joseph (b. 1879); Brenda Eleanor (b. 1880); Phyllis Caroline Eeles (b. 1884)

Henry Eeles Dresser (9 May 1838 – 28 November 1915) was an English businessman and ornithologist.

== Background and early life ==
Henry Dresser was born in Thirsk, Yorkshire, where his father was the manager of the bank set up by his grandfather. Dresser's father left Thirsk in 1840–41 to become a bank manager in Leeds before moving south to set up business as a commission merchant in the Baltic timber business in London in 1846. Henry Dresser senior was in business with his father-in-law, Robert Garbutt of Hull, who traded with Hackman and Co of Vyborg (Viipuri) in southern Finland. Henry Dresser senior purchased a large timber sawmill business, the Lancaster Mills, near Musquash in New Brunswick in 1848.

Henry Eeles Dresser was the eldest son of Henry Dresser and Eliza Ann Garbutt; he had five sisters and three brothers. His father intended him to take over the family business in the Baltic timber trade so took him out of school in Bromley and sent him to Ahrensburg in 1852, to learn German and in 1854, to Gefle and Uppsala to study Swedish. Henry Dresser spent a time in Hackman's offices in Vyborg learning Finnish during 1856–58, during which time he travelled round the Baltic coast. Dresser had a lifelong interest in birds and collected bird skins and eggs from his early teenage years. Whilst he was in Finland in 1858 he discovered breeding waxwings and was the first Englishman to collect their eggs; this brought him fame amongst English ornithologists, most of whom were egg and skin collectors.

== Travels ==
Through the 1860s, Dresser travelled widely through Europe and was twice in New Brunswick at his father's sawmill. He sought out ornithologists with whom he could exchange birds and eggs. He visited, for instance, Heligoland, where he met Heinrich Gätke, of whom he would write an obituary in The Zoologist in 1897.

In 1863, during the American Civil War, he travelled to Texas via the Rio Grande on behalf of Liverpool and Manchester businessmen, taking a cargo of blankets, quinine and other goods in short supply to be sold and purchased raw cotton with the proceeds. During his time in Texas from June 1863 to July 1864 Dresser made a collection of around 400 bird skins from southern Texas. His notes from his time in Texas, published in The Ibis (1865–66) are a leading source of information for the period and include mention of several interesting birds including the extinct (or almost extinct) ivory-billed woodpecker, the almost extinct Eskimo curlew and the endangered whooping crane.

== Contributions to ornithology ==
Dresser was a leading figure in ornithological circles: he was elected a Member of the British Ornithologists' Union in 1865 and served as its secretary from 1882 to 1888. He was a member and fellow of the Linnean and Zoological societies of London and an honorary fellow of the American Ornithologists' Union. He was a close friend of Professor Alfred Newton, Thomas Littleton Powys, 4th Baron Lilford and Alfred Russel Wallace and he knew all the leading ornithologists of his day. He was particularly well known to European, American and Russian ornithologists. He worked with Newton on the development of a close time for British birds when they could not be hunted during the 1860s and 70s, an early part of the development of the bird conservation movement. He was heavily involved with the early Society for the Protection of Birds (which developed to become the RSPB). In spite of his prominence as an ornithologist, this activity came second to his business which, from 1870 until 1910, was in the iron business, with premises at 110 Cannon Street in London.

Dresser was the author of more than 100 scientific papers on birds, mostly concerned with geographical distribution, descriptions of new species and illustrated the eggs of many species for the first time. His Manual of Palaearctic Birds (1902) was an important contribution to the delimitation of the ranges of Palaearctic birds. Dresser produced some of the last folio works on birds, notably A History of the Birds of Europe (1871–1881, supplement issued in 1895–96), begun with Richard Bowdler Sharpe. This was complemented by The Eggs of the Birds of Europe (issued 1905–1910) and monographs on bee-eaters (1884–86) and rollers (1893). These were based upon examination of the leading collections of the day, most notably his own. While producing the 'History', Dresser and some other leading ornithologists, including Lord Lilford, rented rooms at Tenterden Street in London to be close to the library of the Zoological Society of London in Hanover Square. Dresser had privileged access to the notes of many of the most prominent ornithologists, such as Russian Sergei Buturlin, who discovered the main breeding grounds of Ross's gull in 1905 in the delta of the Kolyma River in remote north-east Siberia.

Dresser left England to live in Cannes for the benefit of his health; he died in Monte Carlo on 28 November 1915. His collection of birds had been in the Manchester Museum, part of The University of Manchester, since 1899 and was purchased for the museum by John Thomasson (a Bolton businessman). Dresser's egg collection was acquired by the museum in 1912. The museum also contains some of Dresser's correspondence and diaries.

== Selected publications ==
- Dresser, Henry Eeles (1871–1896). A History of the Birds of Europe, Including All the Species Inhabiting the Western Palaearctic Region. Vol. 1–9. London: self-published. Issued in 84 parts. Richard Bowdler Sharpe was an author on the first 17 parts.
- Dresser, Henry Eeles (1884–1886). A Monograph of the Meropidae, or Family of the Bee-eaters. London: self-published.
- Dresser, Henry Eeles (1893). A Monograph of the Coraciidae, or Family of the Rollers. Kent, England: self-published.
- Dresser, Henry Eeles (1902–1903). A Manual of Palaearctic Birds. Vol. 1–2. London: self-published. Volume 1, Volume 2
- Dresser, Henry Eeles (1910). Eggs of the Birds of Europe, Including All the Species Inhabiting the Western Palaearctic Region. Vol. 1–2. London: self-published. Volume 1 Text, Volume 2 Plates (issued in 24 parts beginning in 1905)

== Sources ==
- McGhie, Henry (2017). Henry Dresser and Victorian Ornithology: Birds, Books and Business. Manchester: Manchester University Press. ISBN 978-1-78499-413-6.
