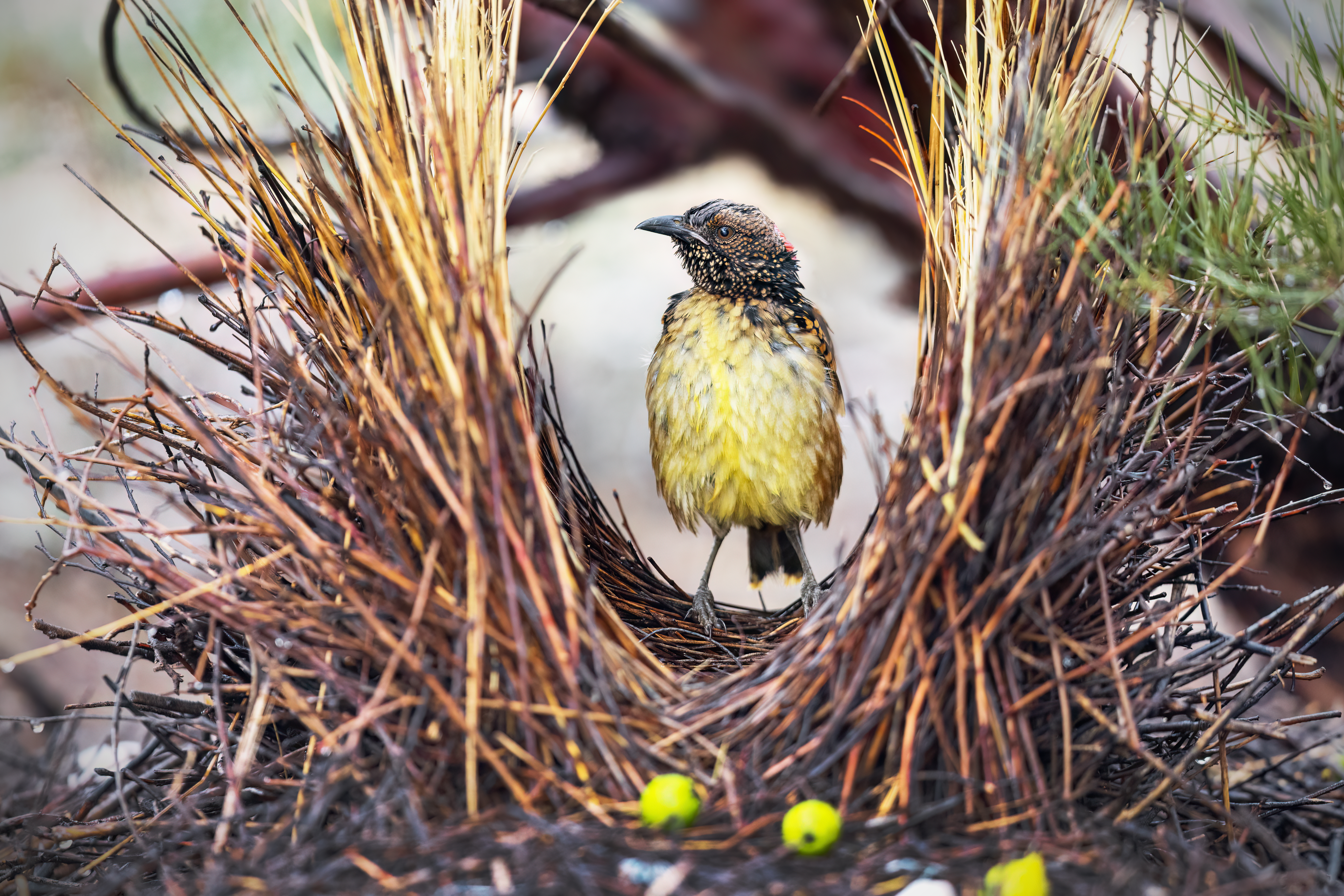

Conservation status
- Least Concern (IUCN 3.1)

Scientific classification
- Kingdom: Animalia
- Phylum: Chordata
- Class: Aves
- Order: Passeriformes
- Family: Ptilonorhynchidae
- Genus: Chlamydera
- Species: C. guttata

Binomial name
- Chlamydera guttata Gould, 1862

Synonyms
- Chlamydodera guttata

= Western bowerbird =

Species of Australian bird

The western bowerbird (Chlamydera guttata) is a species of bird in the family Ptilonorhynchidae. The species is a common endemic of Australia. It has a disjunct distribution, occurring in Central Australia and the Pilbara region of Western Australia.

== Taxonomy ==
There are two subspecies, the nominate Chlamydera guttata guttata, which occupies most of its range, and C. guttata cateri, which occurs only the North West Cape in Western Australia. The species was first collected in 1861 by the explorer Francis Gregory, who gave the specimen to John Gould. The specific name guttata means spotted, referring to its plumage. The species is similar to Chlamydera maculata, the spotted bowerbird, and has often been treated as a subspecies of it.

== Description ==
The western bowerbird is smaller than the other bowerbird it shares its range with, the great bowerbird. It measures 24–28 cm (9.4–11.0 in) in length and weighs 120–150 g (4.2–5.3 oz). Both sexes are similar in size and dimensions, except that the tail of the female is slightly longer. The plumage is brown with reddish or buff spots over the throat, chest, neck, back, head and wings, with a pink erectile crest on the nape. The tail is brown and the undersides are buff. The plumage of the female is similar to the male but more spotted on the throat.

== Diet ==
The western bowerbird feeds on fruits, particularly those of the rock fig (Ficus platypoda), sandalwood, snake gourd (Trichosanthes cucumerina) and mistletoes. They also enter farms to feed on cultivated fruits. Other items taken in the diet include nectar, flowers, insects (e.g. ants, moths, beetles and grasshoppers), and spiders. They need to drink regularly and are rarely found far from water.

== Behaviour ==
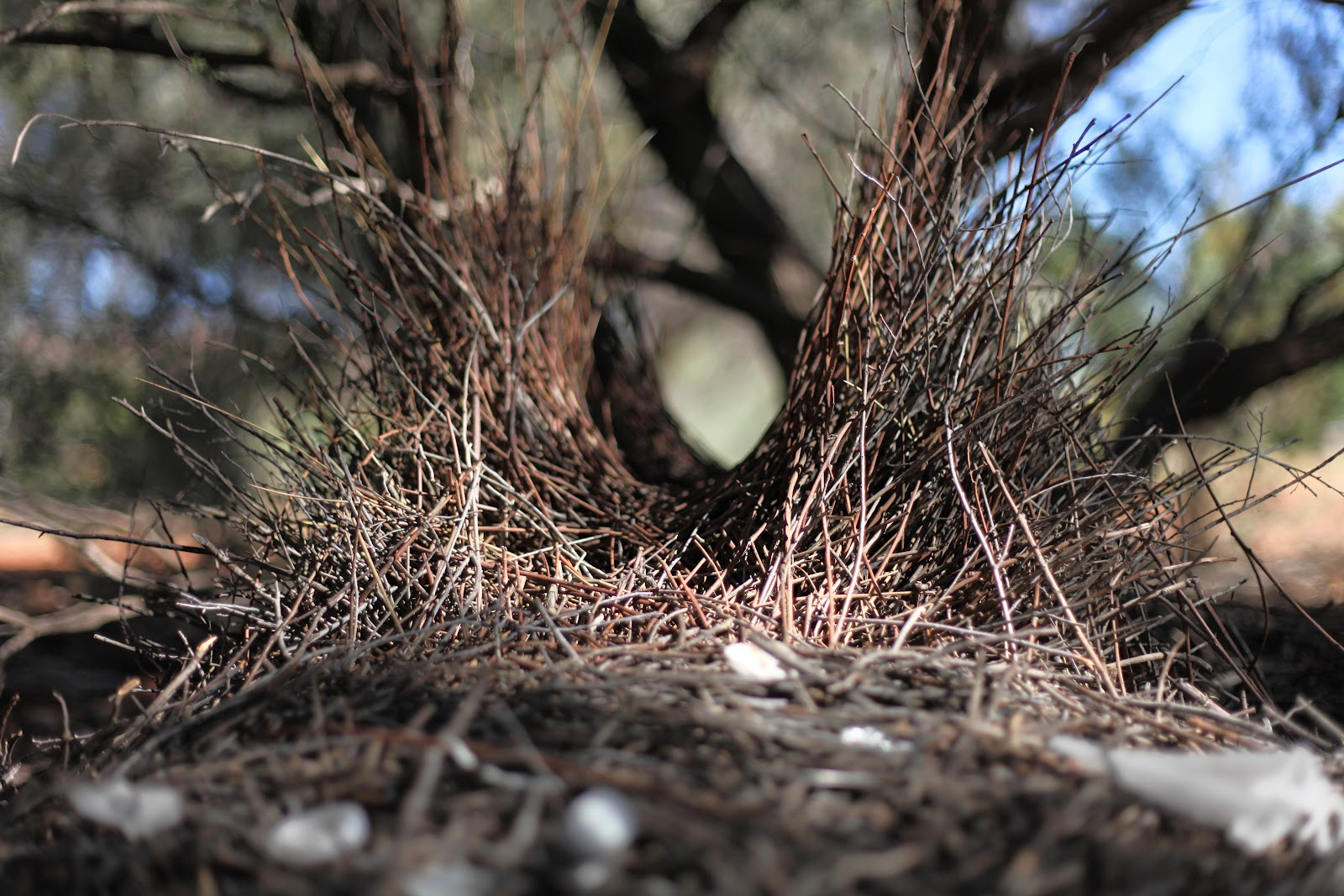
Western bowerbirds build bowers similar to the picture above.

Like most bowerbirds the western bowerbird is polygamous, with a male mating with several females over a breeding season and the female undertaking all nesting, incubation and chick-rearing responsibilities. As is typical in the family the male constructs an elaborate bower with which to attract females. Western bowerbird bowers are paired avenues of sticks, 20–25 cm (7.9–9.8 in) tall and 25–35 cm (9.8–13.8 in) long, placed on top of a platform of sticks. The bower is decorated with green and white objects, including berries, fruits, shells, pebbles and bones. Man-made objects may also be used for decoration, including glass, gun casings and metal objects. Each bower may be used for a number of years; when a new bower is constructed, material from the older bower may be reused. The male advertises his bower with calls; when the female arrives to inspect he will perform ritualised dances, fanning his tail, jumping and wing flicking, as well as further calling. Decorations will also be held in the bill and shaken vigorously, and the pink crest on the neck will be erected.

The female constructs the nest, a shallow cup of small twigs nested on a larger platform of sticks, around 2–6 m (6.6–19.7 ft) up a tree or shrub, often in a clump of mistletoe. The clutch is usually one or two eggs, which are green to buff, glossy and covered in dark scribble patterns. The incubation period is unknown.
