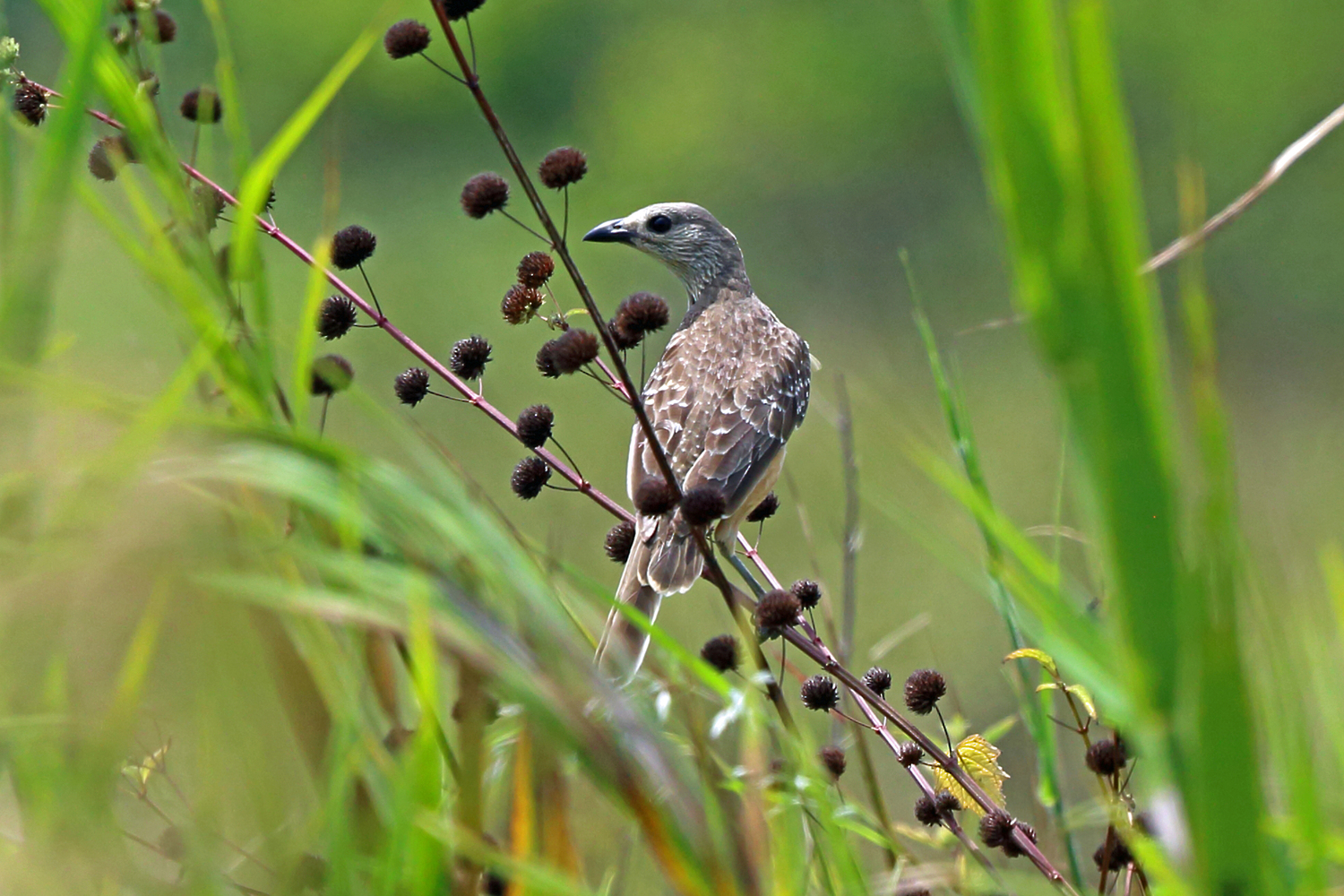
- Fawn-breasted bowerbird, Bandar Udara Sentani, Papua, Indonesia

Conservation status
- Least Concern (IUCN 3.1)

Scientific classification
- Kingdom: Animalia
- Phylum: Chordata
- Class: Aves
- Order: Passeriformes
- Family: Ptilonorhynchidae
- Genus: Chlamydera
- Species: C. cerviniventris

Binomial name
- Chlamydera cerviniventris Gould, 1850

= Fawn-breasted bowerbird =

Species of bird

The fawn-breasted bowerbird (Chlamydera cerviniventris) is a medium-sized, up to 32 cm (13 in) long, bowerbird with a greyish brown spotted white plumage, a black bill, dark brown iris, yellow mouth and an orange buff below. Both sexes are similar. The female is slightly smaller than the male.

The fawn-breasted bowerbird is distributed throughout New Guinea and northern Cape York Peninsula in Queensland, where it inhabits tropical forests, mangroves, savanna woodlands and forest edges. Its diet consists mainly of figs, fruits and insects. The nest is a loose cup made of small sticks up in a tree. The bower itself is that of "avenue-type" with two side walls of sticks and usually decorated with green berries.

A common species in its habitat range, the fawn-breasted bowerbird is evaluated as Least Concern on the IUCN Red List of Threatened Species.

The following is an account by expedition naturalist John MacGillivray from the Narrative of the Voyage of H.M.S. Rattlesnake 1846-1850 Vol I. pp. 323–325. It describes the first recorded observation and specimen collection of the Chlamydera cerviniventris.

″Two days before we left Cape York I was told that some bower-birds had been seen in a thicket, or patch of low scrub, half a mile from the beach, and after a long search I found a recently constructed bower, four feet long and eighteen inches high, with some fresh berries lying upon it. The bower was situated near the border of the thicket, the bushes composing which were seldom more than ten feet high, growing in smooth sandy soil without grass.

Next morning I was landed before daylight, and proceeded to the place in company with Paida, taking with us a large board on which to carry off the bower specimen. I had great difficulty in inducing my friend to accompany me, as he was afraid of a war party of Gomokudins, which tribe had lately given notice that they were coming to fight the Evans Bay people. However I promised to protect him, and loaded one barrel with ball, which gave him increased confidence, still he insisted on carrying a large bundle of spears and a throwing-stick. Of late Paida's tribe have taken steps to prevent being surprised by their enemies. At night they remove in their canoes to the neighbouring island Robumo, and sleep there, returning in the morning to the shore, and take care not to go away to a distance singly or unarmed.

While watching in the scrub I caught several glimpses of the tervinya (the native name) as it darted through the bushes in the neighbourhood of the bower, announcing its presence by an occasional loud churr-r-r, and imitating the notes of various other birds, especially the leather-head. I never before met with a more wary bird, and for a long time it enticed me to follow it to a short distance, then flying off and alighting on the bower, it would deposit a berry or two, run through, and be off again (as the black told me) before I could reach the spot. At length, just as my patience was being exhausted, I saw the bird enter the bower and disappear, when I fired at random through the twigs, fortunately with effect. So closely had we concealed ourselves latterly, and so silent had we been, that a kangaroo while feeding actually hopped up within fifteen yards, unconscious of our presence until fired at. My bower-bird proved to be a new species, since described by Mr. Gould as Chlamydera cerviniventris, and the bower is exhibited in the British Museum."

== Gallery ==
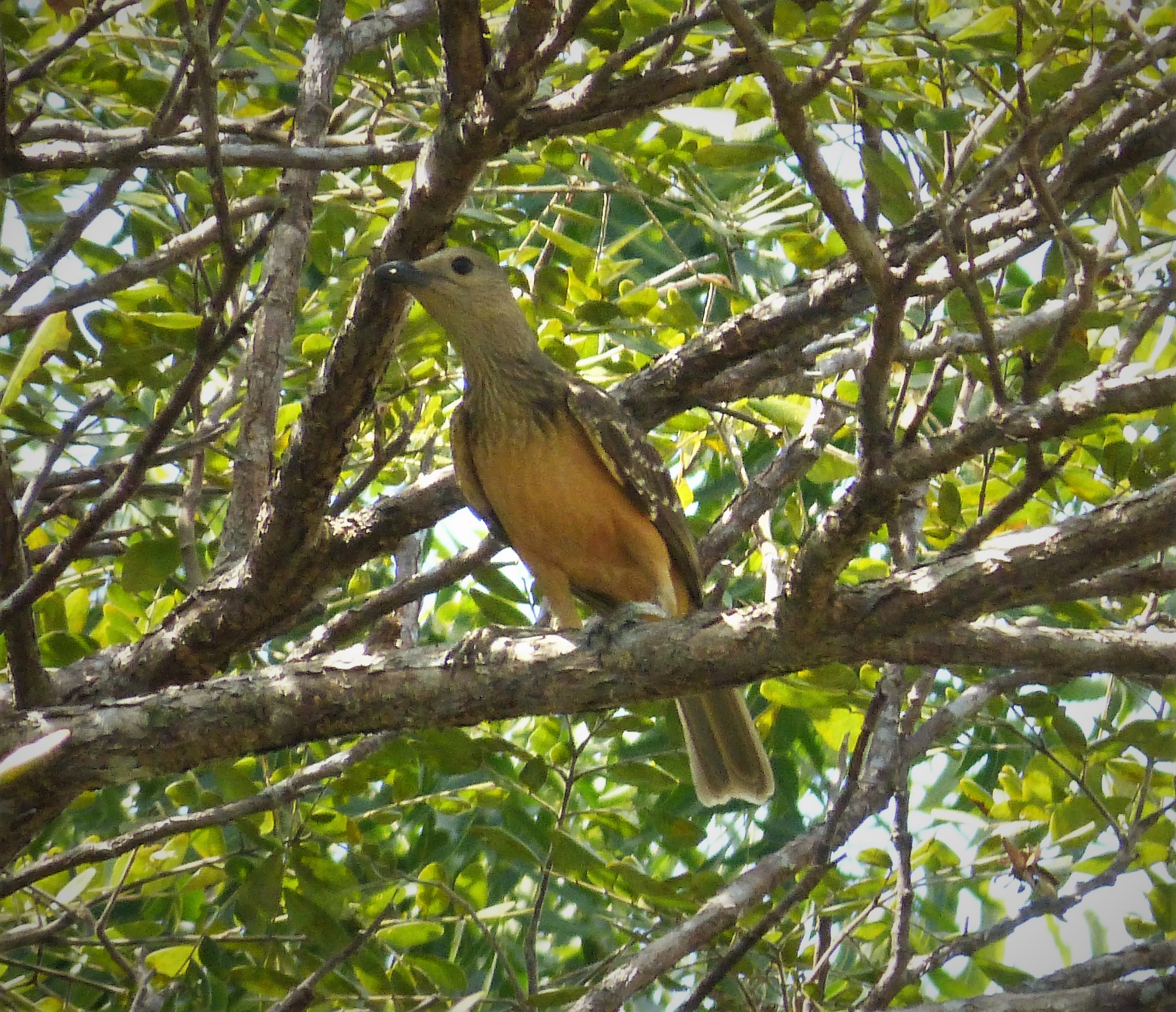
Port Moresby, Papua New Guinea

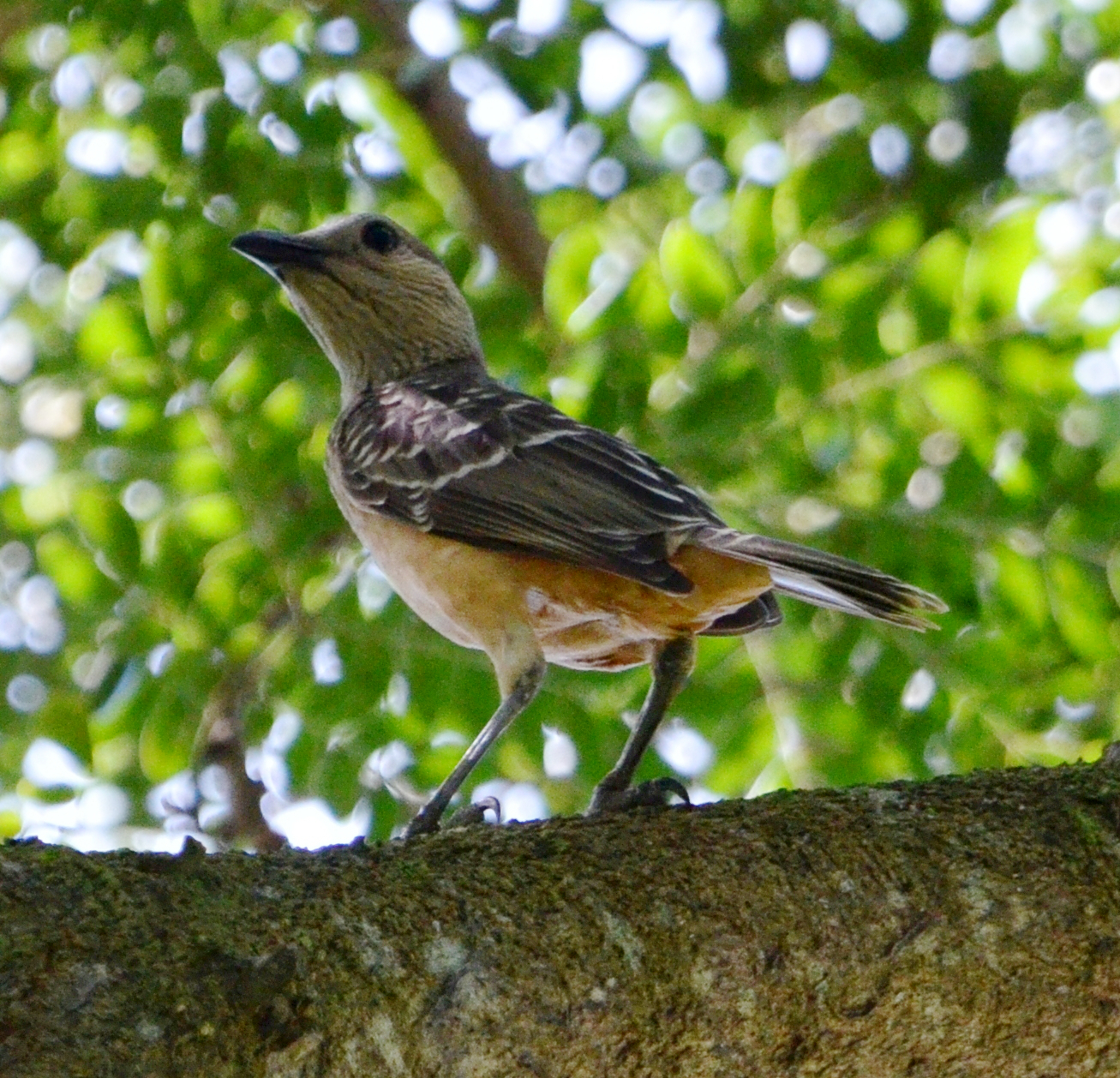
Port Moresby

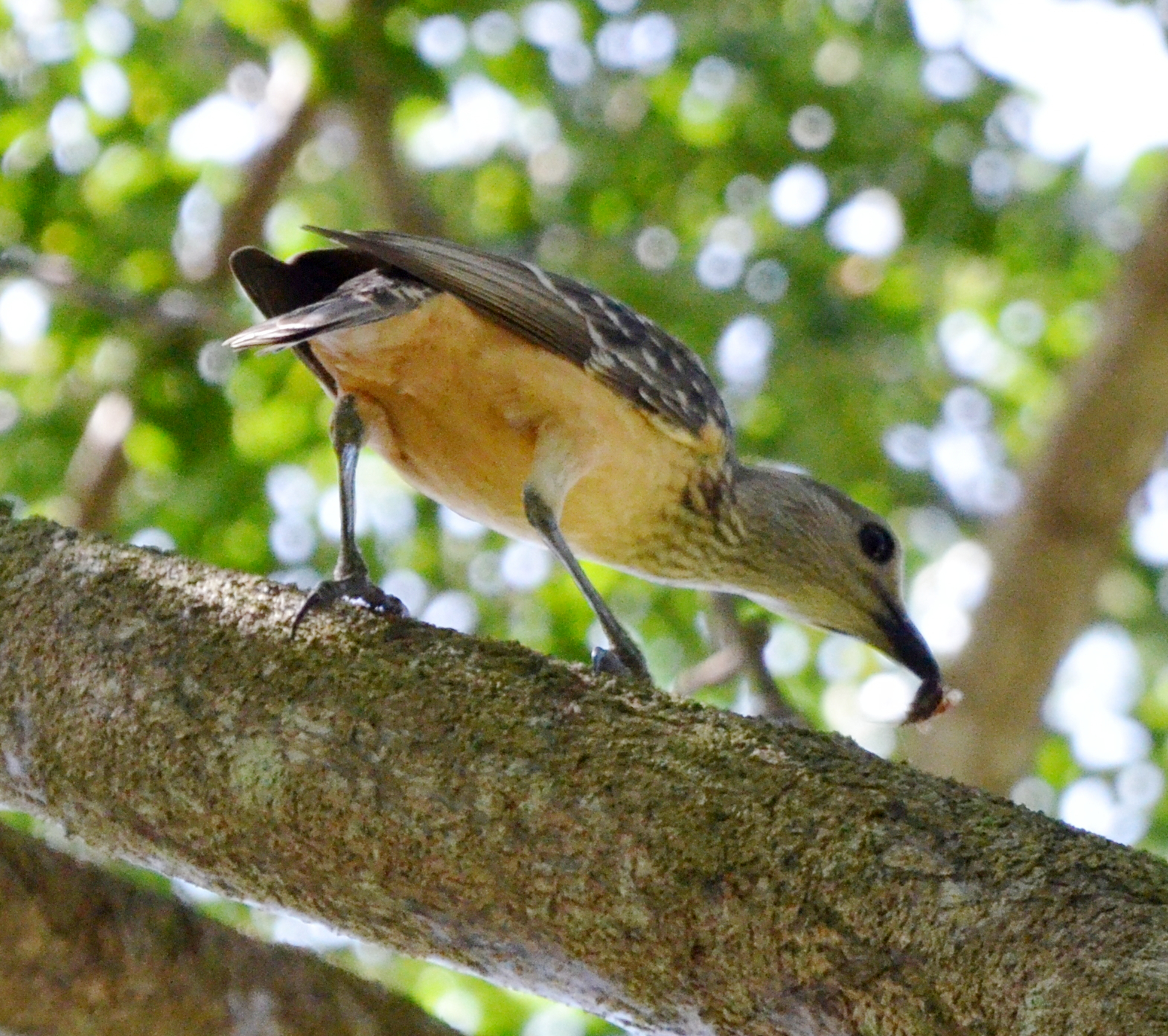
Port Moresby

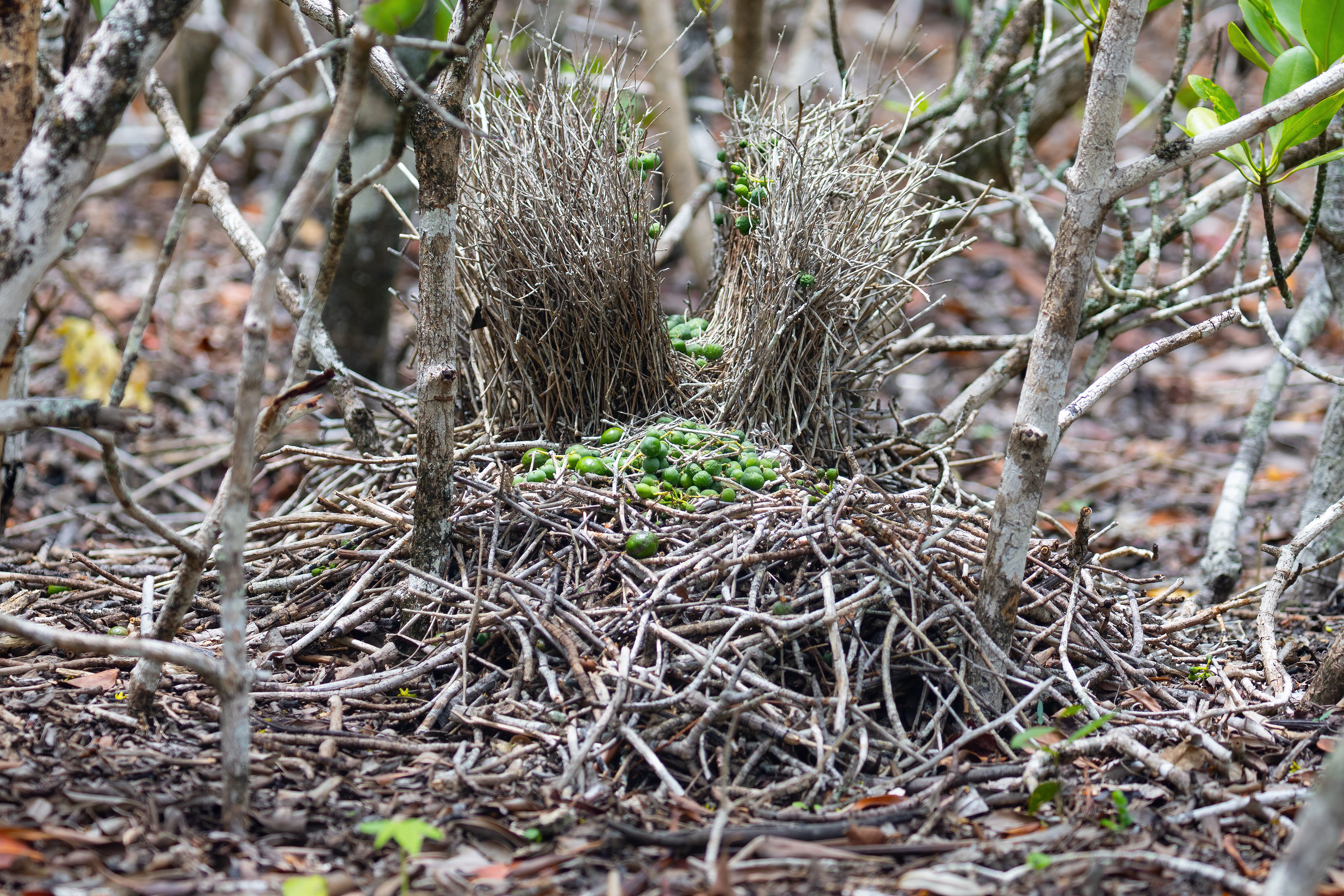
Bower, decorated with green berries, Portland Roads, Cape York, Queensland
