= Sericuloides =

Sericuloides Temporal range: Late Oligocene

Scientific classification
- Kingdom: Animalia
- Phylum: Chordata
- Class: Aves
- Order: Passeriformes
- Family: Ptilonorhynchidae
- Genus: †Sericuloides
- Species: †S. marynguyenae

Binomial name
- †Sericuloides marynguyenae Nguyen, 2023

Extinct genus of birds

Sericuloides is an extinct genus of ptilonorhynchid that lived during the Chattian stage of the Oligocene epoch.

== Distribution ==
Sericuloides marynguyenae is known from Riversleigh.
