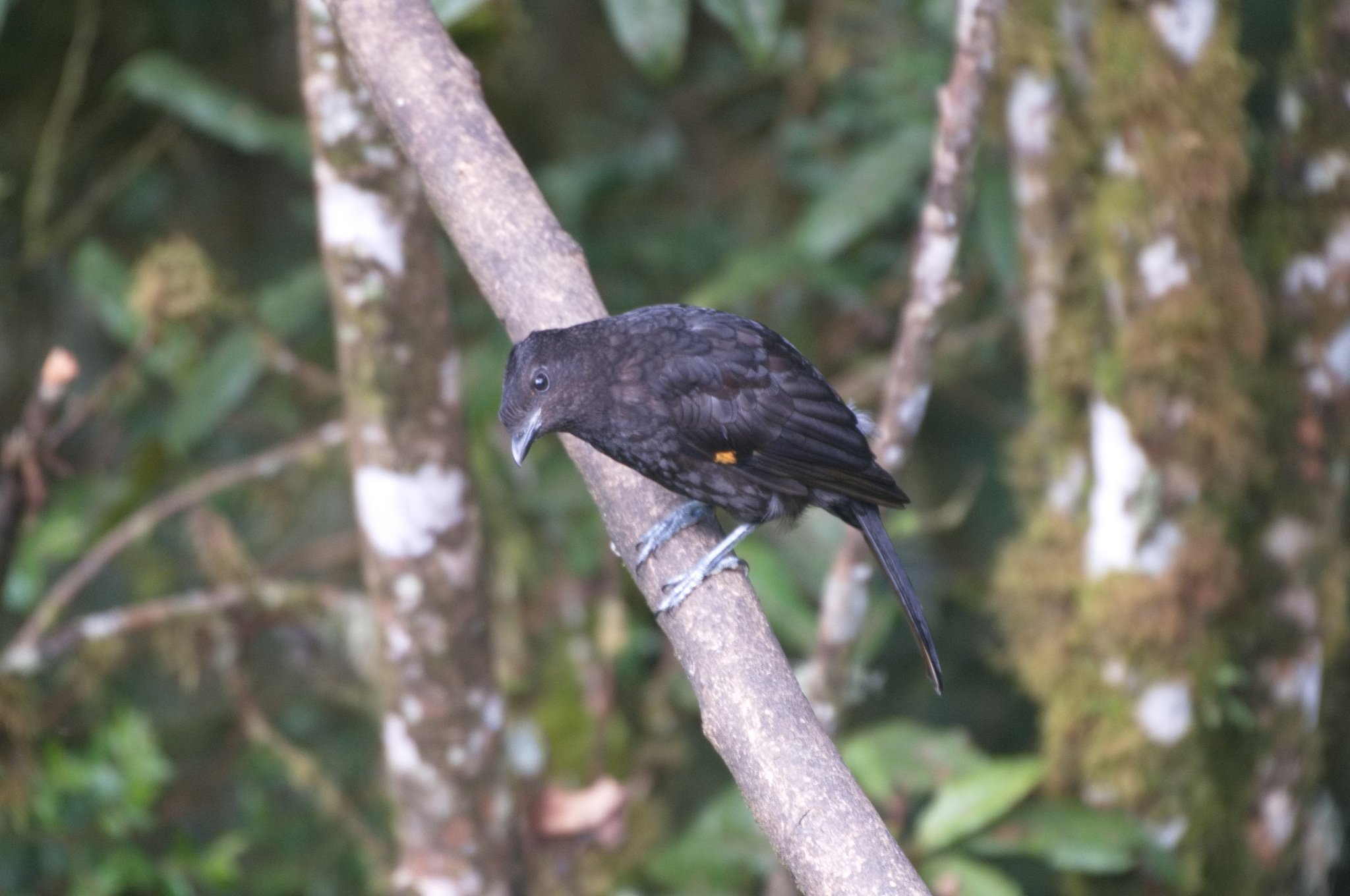
- Female

Conservation status
- Least Concern (IUCN 3.1)

Scientific classification
- Kingdom: Animalia
- Phylum: Chordata
- Class: Aves
- Order: Passeriformes
- Family: Ptilonorhynchidae
- Genus: Archboldia; Rand, 1940
- Species: A. papuensis

Binomial name
- Archboldia papuensis Rand, 1940

= Archbold's bowerbird =

Species of bird

Archbold's bowerbird (Archboldia papuensis) is a passerine bird in the bowerbird family Ptilonorhynchidae that is endemic to highland forests of New Guinea.

It is medium-sized, dark grey songbird with brown iris, grey feet and black bill. The male has narrow black scalloping with golden yellow crown feathers. The female is smaller than the male, with yellow patch on the wing and has no crown feathering.

== Taxonomy ==
Archbold's bowerbird was formally described in 1940 by the Canadian zoologist Austin L. Rand from a male specimen collected at an altitude of 2,200 m (7,200 ft) 18 km (11 mi) north of Lake Habbema in the Snow Mountains of Western New Guinea. Rand erected a new genus, Archboldia, and coined the binomial name Archboldia papuensis. The genus and common names honour the American zoologist Richard Archbold. A molecular phylogenetic study by Per Ericson and collaborators published in 2020 found that Archbold's bowerbird was embedded in the genus Amblyornis.

Two subspecies are recognised:

- A. p. papuensis Rand, 1940 – montane central west New Guinea
- A. p. sanfordi Mayr & Gilliard, 1950 – montane central east New Guinea

The subspecies A. p. sanfordi, Sanford's bowerbird, has sometimes been treated as a separate species.

== Description ==
The male Archbold's bowerbird has an overall length of 37 cm (15 in) and a weight of 170–195 g (6.0–6.9 oz). The female is slight smaller with a length of 35 cm (14 in) and a weight of 163–185 g (5.7–6.5 oz). The male of the nominate race is dark grey to black with an orange-yellow crest. The bill is black, the legs are blue-grey and the iris is dark brown. The female is dark brown rather than black and lacks a crest. The primary coverts are yellowish producing a patch on the leading edge of the wing.

Archbold's bowerbird uses the shed ornamental plumes of the King of Saxony bird-of-paradise to decorate its courtship bower.

Archbold's bowerbird is evaluated as least concern on the IUCN Red List of Threatened Species.
