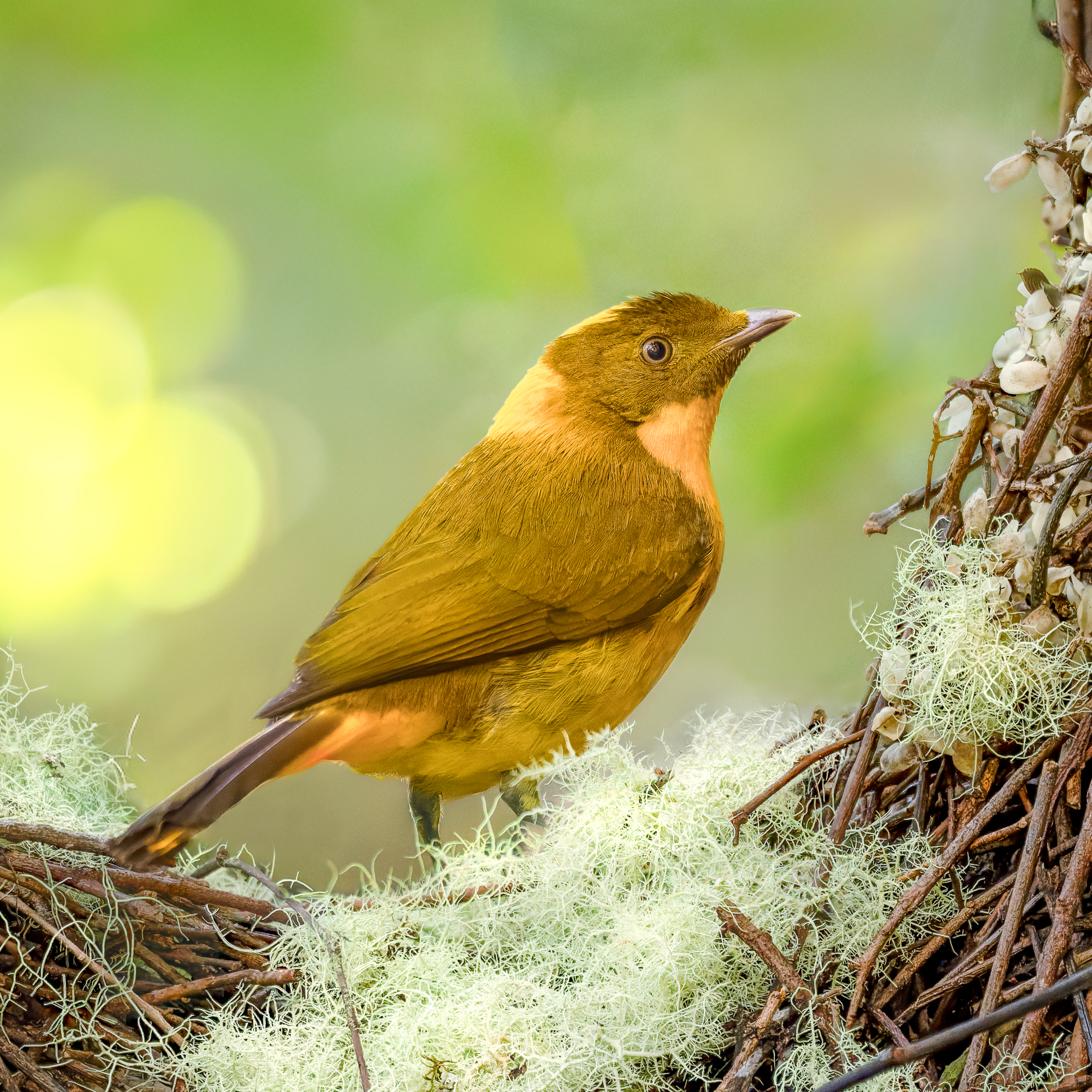

Conservation status
- Near Threatened (IUCN 3.1)

Scientific classification
- Kingdom: Animalia
- Phylum: Chordata
- Class: Aves
- Order: Passeriformes
- Family: Ptilonorhynchidae
- Genus: Prionodura; De Vis, 1883
- Species: P. newtoniana

Binomial name
- Prionodura newtoniana De Vis, 1883
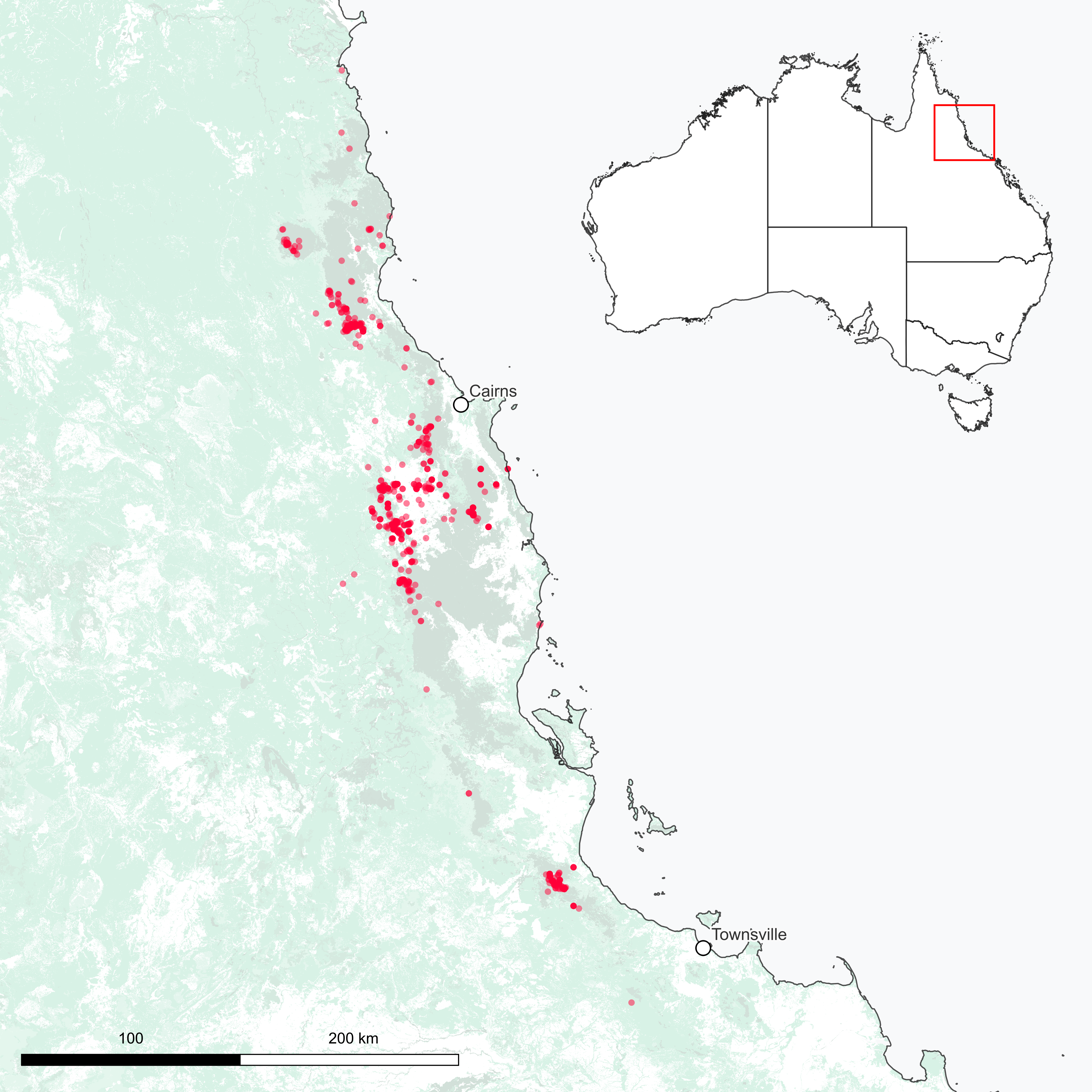
- Species distribution

= Golden bowerbird =

Species of bird

The golden bowerbird (Prionodura newtoniana) is a species of passerine bird in the bowerbird family Ptilonorhynchidae. It is endemic to Queensland in Australia, where it is limited to the Atherton region.

== Taxonomy ==
The golden bowerbird was formally described in 1883 by the English zoologist Charles Walter De Vis based on a specimen collected by Kendall Broadbent near the Tully River in North Queensland, Australia. De Vis introduced a new genus Prionodura for the species and coined the binomial name Prionodura newtoniana. The genus name combined the Ancient Greek πριονωδης/prionōdēs meaning "serrated" with ουρα/oura meaning "tail". The specific epithet newtoniana was chosen to honour the English ornithologist Alfred Newton. The golden bowerbird is monotypic: no subspecies are recognised.

== Description ==
The male golden bowerbird has a brown head and brown wings which are bright yellow-gold underneath, as are the tail, crest and nape. The female is olive brown with ash-gray underparts. Immatures look similar to the female except their eyes are brown. This is the smallest species of bowerbird.

== Distribution and habitat ==
The golden bowerbird has a patchy distribution in northeastern Queensland. It has a limited range and its population is thought to have declined as much as 60% over three generations of the species. It lives in rainforests above 350 metres (1,100 ft) in elevation, including some habitat that has been disturbed by human activities such as logging. Traditional bowerbird habitats include mild slopes, ridges immediately surrounding hill crests, and below steeper slopes where terrain levels off; canopy coverage is often greater than 70%; none on hilltops or in disturbed forest.

== Behaviour and ecology ==
=== Breeding ===
Like most other bowerbirds, the male builds and maintains a bower over several years. Males do not grow their adult plumage for at least five or six years, during which time they wander, learn the social hierarchy of mature males, and practice building bower-like structures. Upon maturity, a male establishes his bower site, builds his structure, and spends much time decorating it. He may steal decorations from his neighbours, and defend his possessions from other males. During the breeding season, generally August through December, the male perches at his bower and produces a number of vocalizations, which attract females.

The female establishes a nest in cup-shaped crevices, usually in tree trunks. There are one to two eggs per clutch. The nestlings are fed fruit and insects, and fledging occurs most often in January. The life span ranges from 6 to 30 years, depending on the species.

=== Food and feeding ===
The golden bowerbird feeds mainly on fruits, and sometimes takes insects and spiders. Fruits, especially those from vines, as well as flowers, buds, and arthropods. Nestlings eat largely fruits and a few insects, mostly cicadas (Cicadidae), with the percentage of fruit rising as the nestling grows older. Fruits and insects are eaten by fledglings. In the Paluma Range, males cache fruits, especially bunches of wild pepper (Piper), in crevices surrounding bower sites to be recovered for later use; one nesting female was spotted retrieving a cached fruit. Forages by sallying and seeking; cicadas are infrequently hawked. Usually eats alone; however, 3–4 (often juvenile) individuals may forage in the same fruiting canopy with other bird species, including other bowerbirds.

=== Sounds and vocal behavior ===
Peak calling season is September–December. The sounds the golden bowerbird makes vary by populations. However, the typical male call song is a pulsating rattle note, which lasts 1–2 seconds and is repeated several times. Other kinds of calls include: squeals, screeches, scold-rasps, or wolf-whistle notes or a medley of them; also high-quality mimicry of calls of other bird species. In addition, the male birds are known to respond more strongly to the local dialects than foreign dialects. This means that when one of the male birds recognises the call they respond in a different manner than if they did not recognise the call.

== Conservation status ==
The golden bowerbird's population has decreased 20–29% recently due to the effects of cyclones that moved through their habitat, which destroyed many nesting areas. These cyclones and climate change continue to threaten the golden bowerbird's population, including heat waves that have resulted in lower resources for the birds. The birds' range is mostly within a conservation area, so they are afforded protection from many human activities. Currently, there are suggestions for further studies examining how the birds are affected by climate change in order to mitigate some of its effects.

== Gallery ==
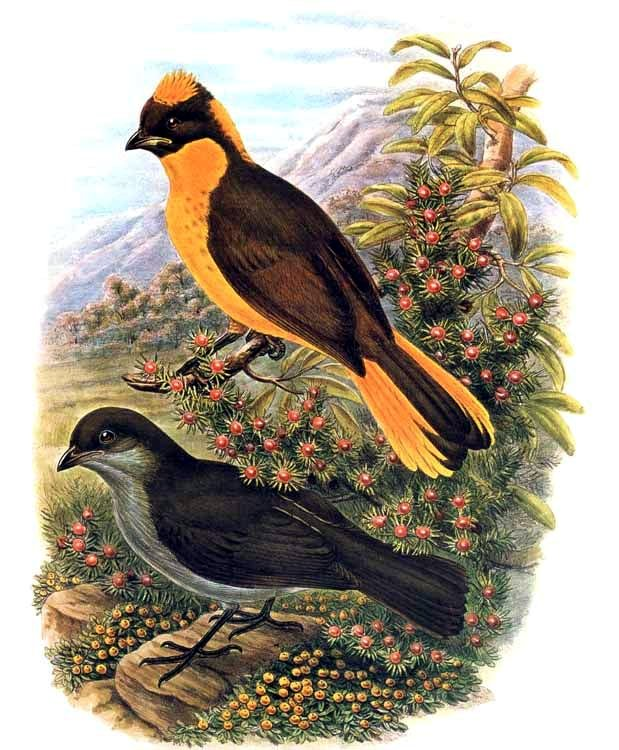

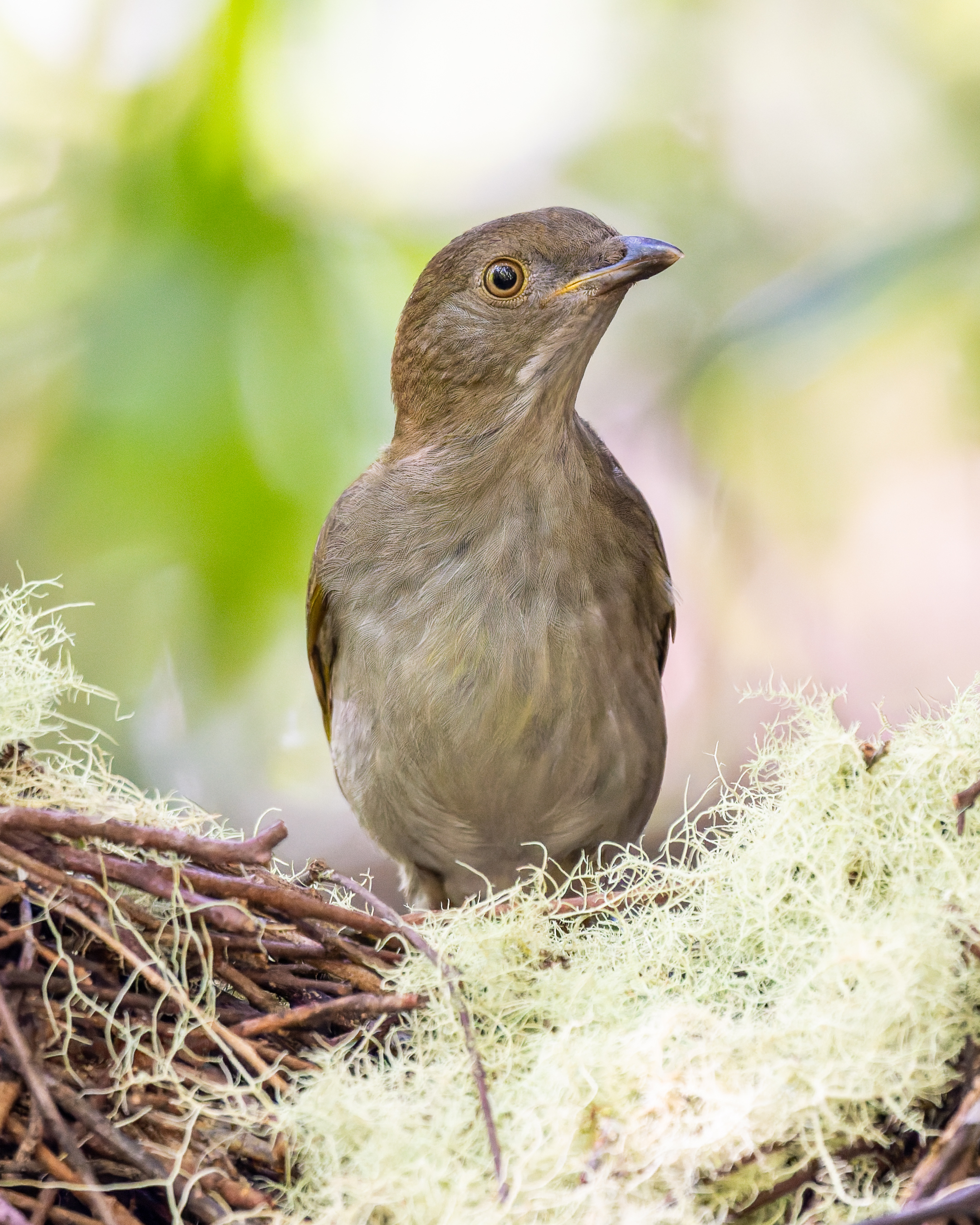
Immature

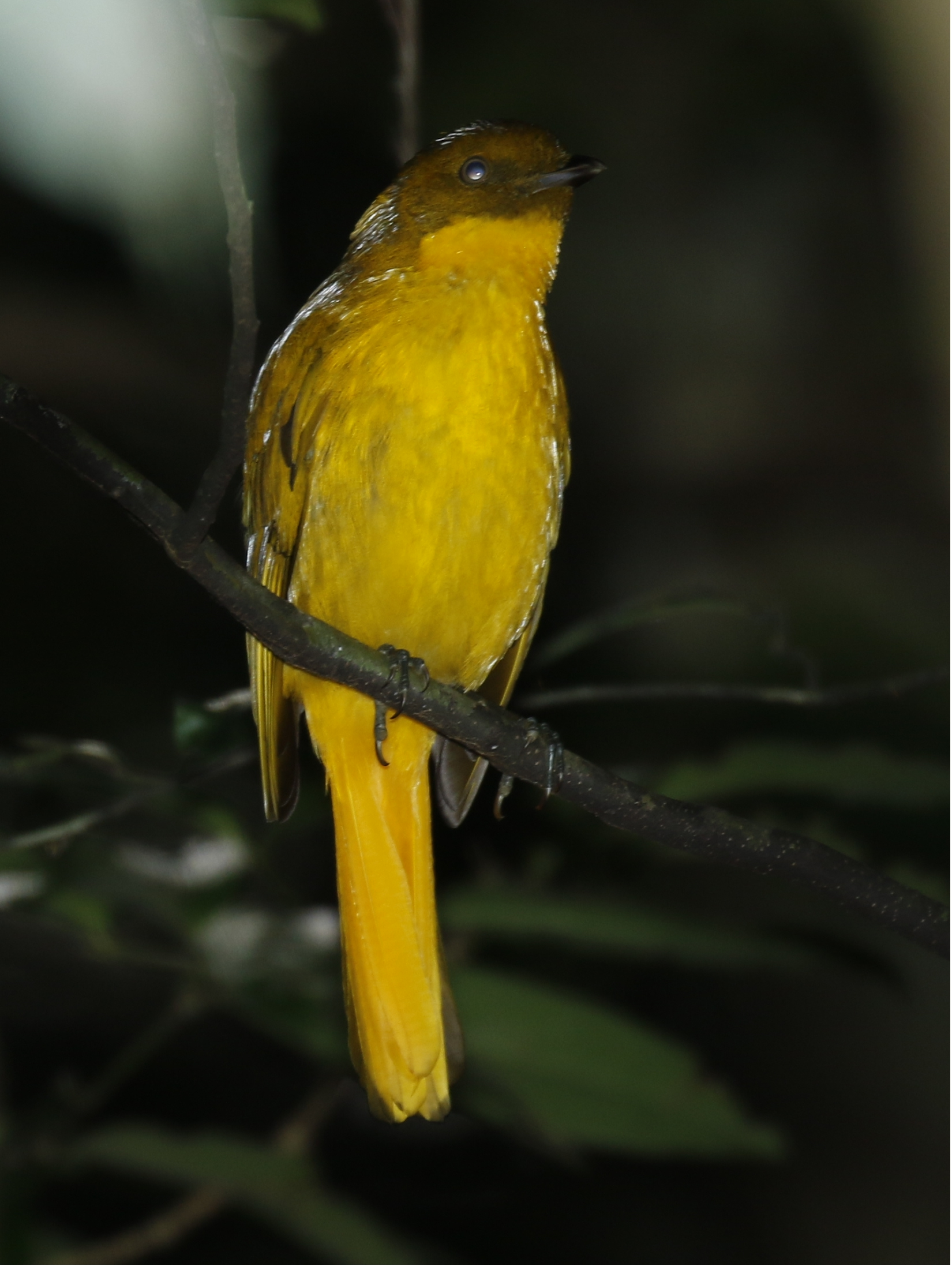

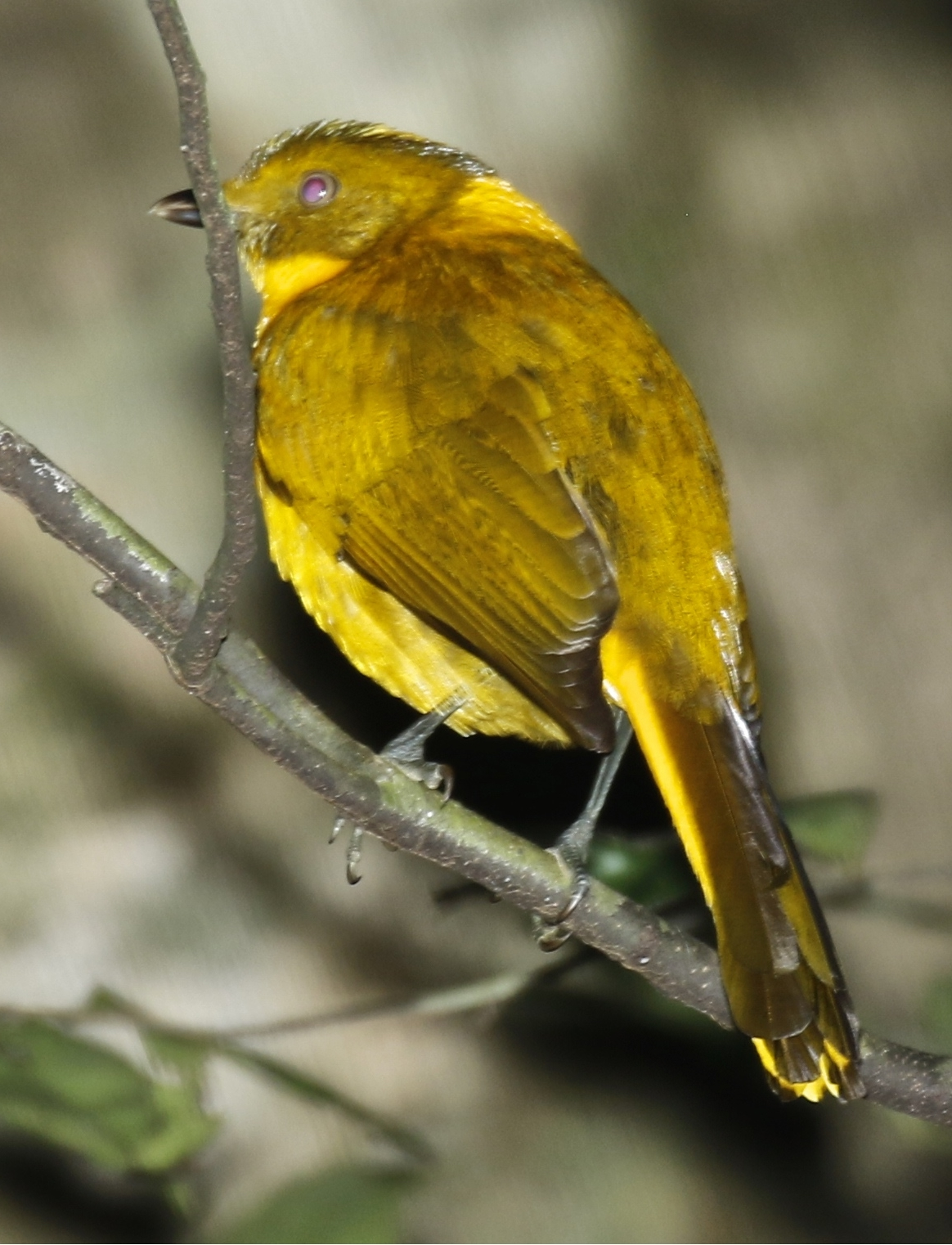

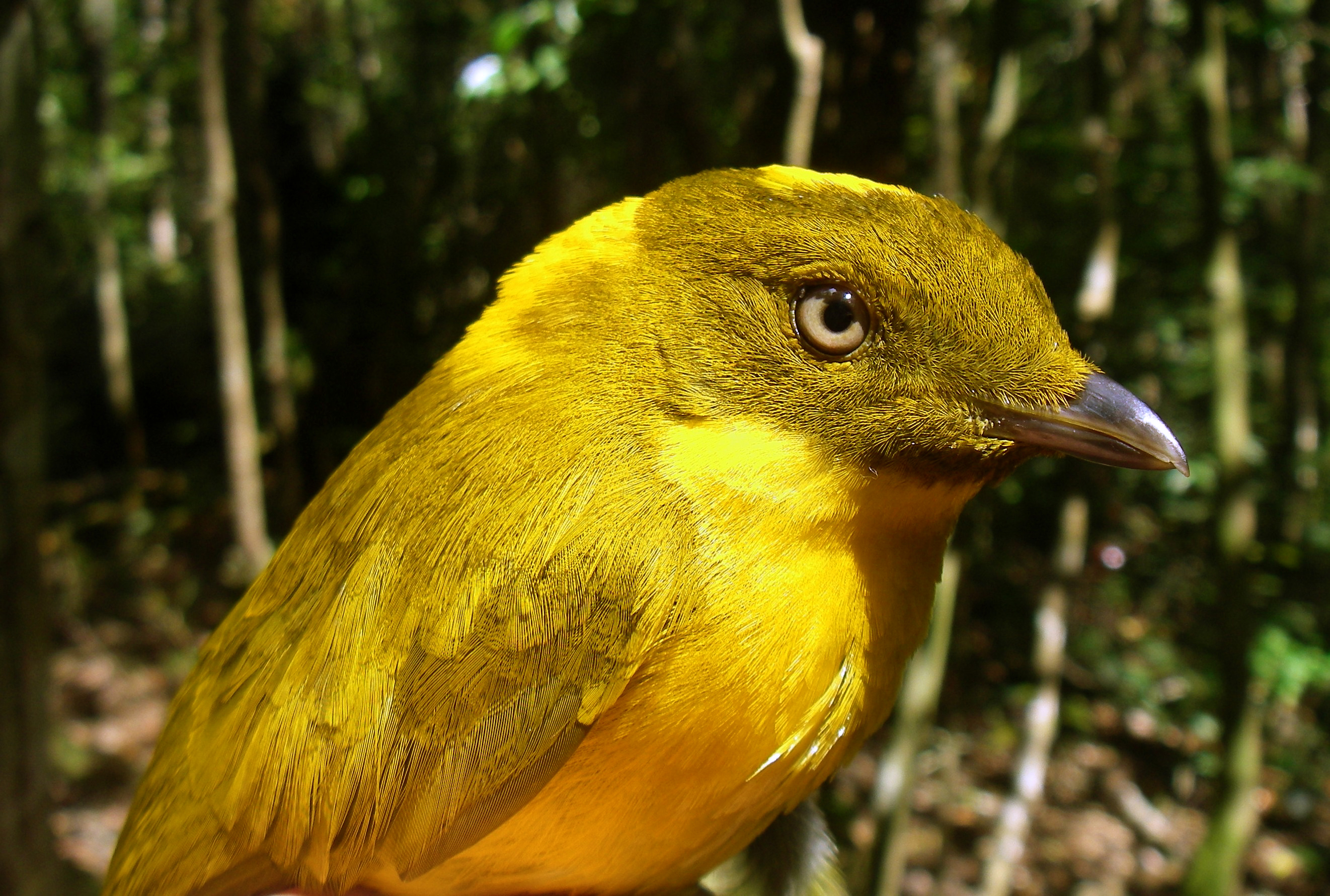
