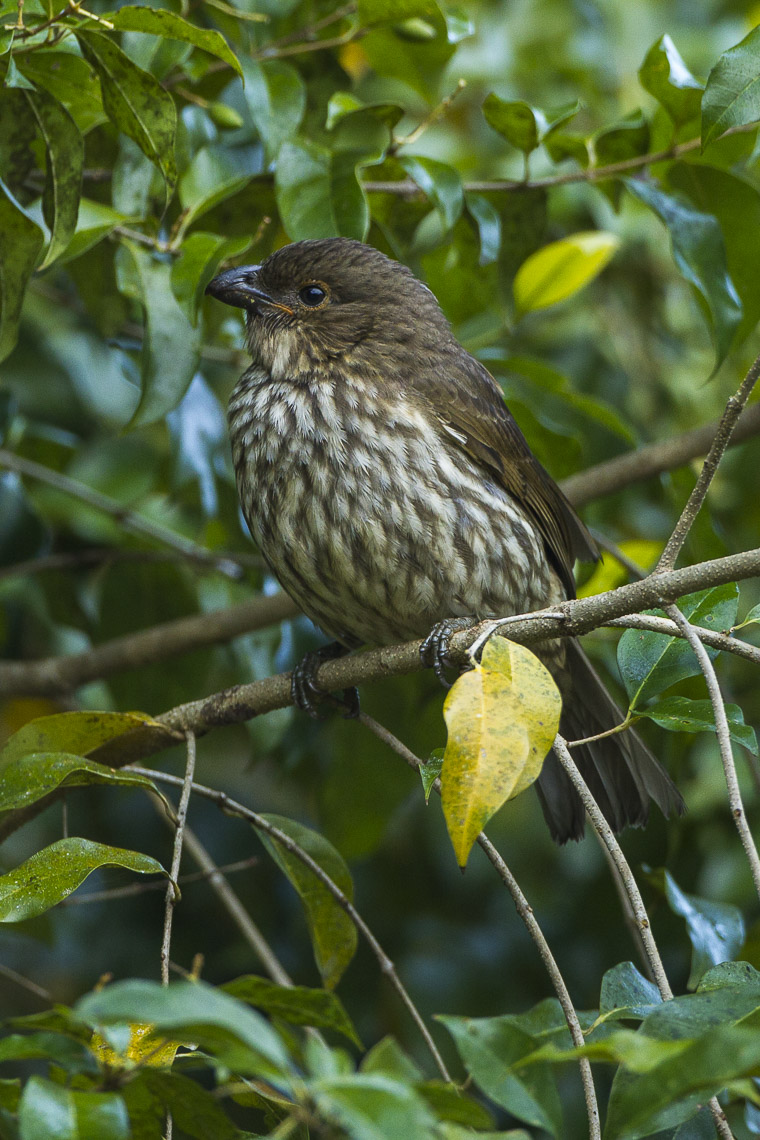

Conservation status
- Near Threatened (IUCN 3.1)

Scientific classification
- Kingdom: Animalia
- Phylum: Chordata
- Class: Aves
- Order: Passeriformes
- Family: Ptilonorhynchidae
- Genus: Scenopoeetes; Coues, 1891
- Species: S. dentirostris

Binomial name
- Scenopoeetes dentirostris (Ramsay, 1876)
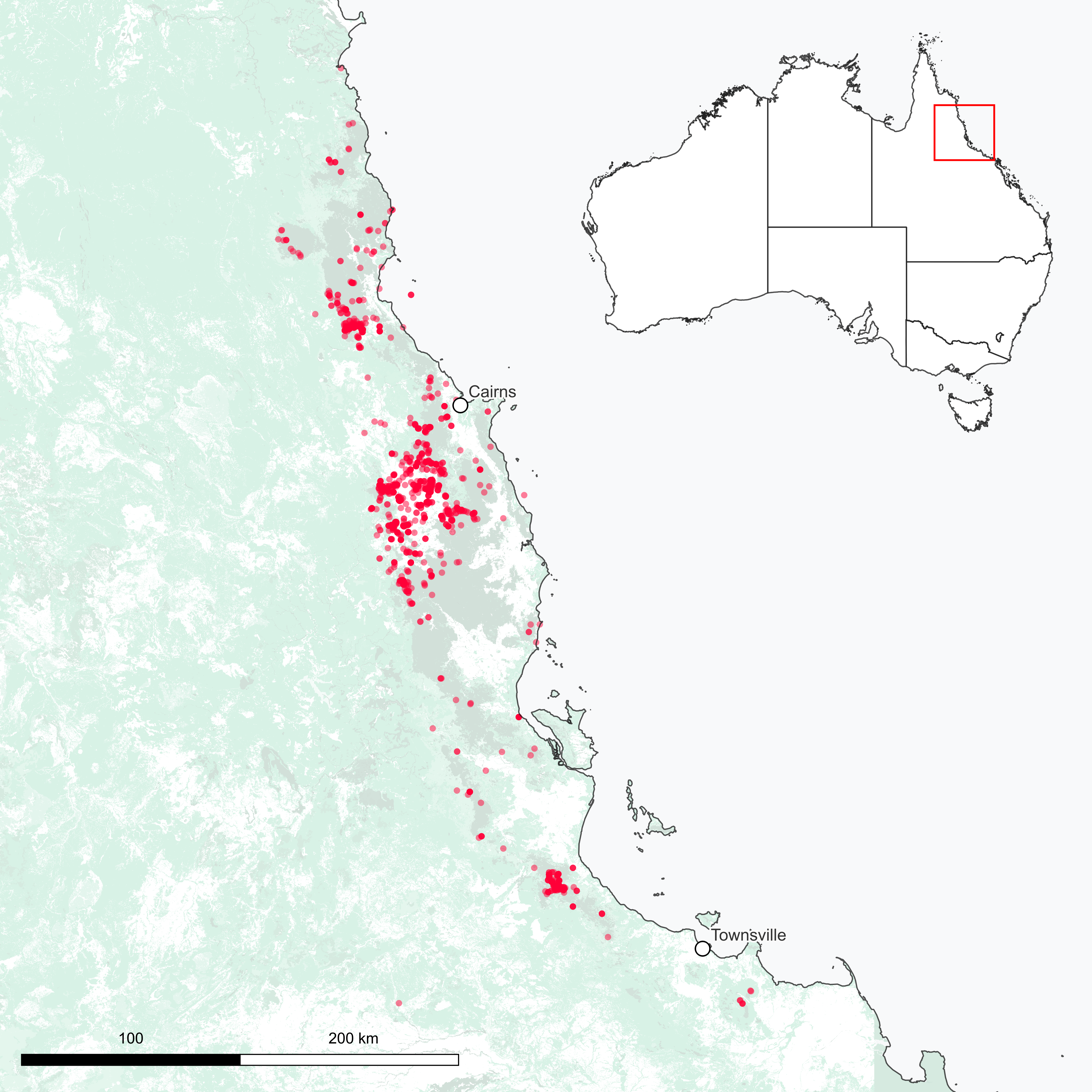
- Species distribution

= Tooth-billed bowerbird =

Species of bird

The tooth-billed bowerbird (Scenopoeetes dentirostris), also known as the stagemaker bowerbird or tooth-billed catbird, is a species of passerine bird in the bowerbird family Ptilonorhynchidae. It is the only species placed in the genus Scenopoeetes. It is found in the Cape York Peninsula and northeast Queensland of northeast Australia.

== Taxonomy ==
The tooth-billed bowerbird was formally described in 1876 by the Australian zoologist Edward Pierson Ramsay. He introduced a new genus Scenopoeus and coined the binomial name Scenopoeus dentirostris. Unfortunately the name Scenopoeus had earlier been used by Louis Agassiz for a genus of insects and in 1891 the American ornithologist Elliott Coues introduced a replacement name, Scenopoeetes. The genus name Scenopoeetes combines the Ancient Greek σκηνη/skēnē meaning "stage" or "tent" with ποιητης/poiētēs meaning "maker". The specific epithet dentirostris is derived from Latin dens, dentis meaning "tooth" and "-rostris" meaning "-billed". The tooth-billed bowerbird is monotypic: no subspecies are recognised.

== Description ==
The tooth-billed bowerbird is a medium-sized (approximately 27 centimetres (11 in) long) bowerbird. It is a stocky olive-brown bird with brown-streaked buffish white underparts, grey feet, a brown iris and a distinctive serrated bill. The sexes are similar, but the female is slightly smaller than the male.

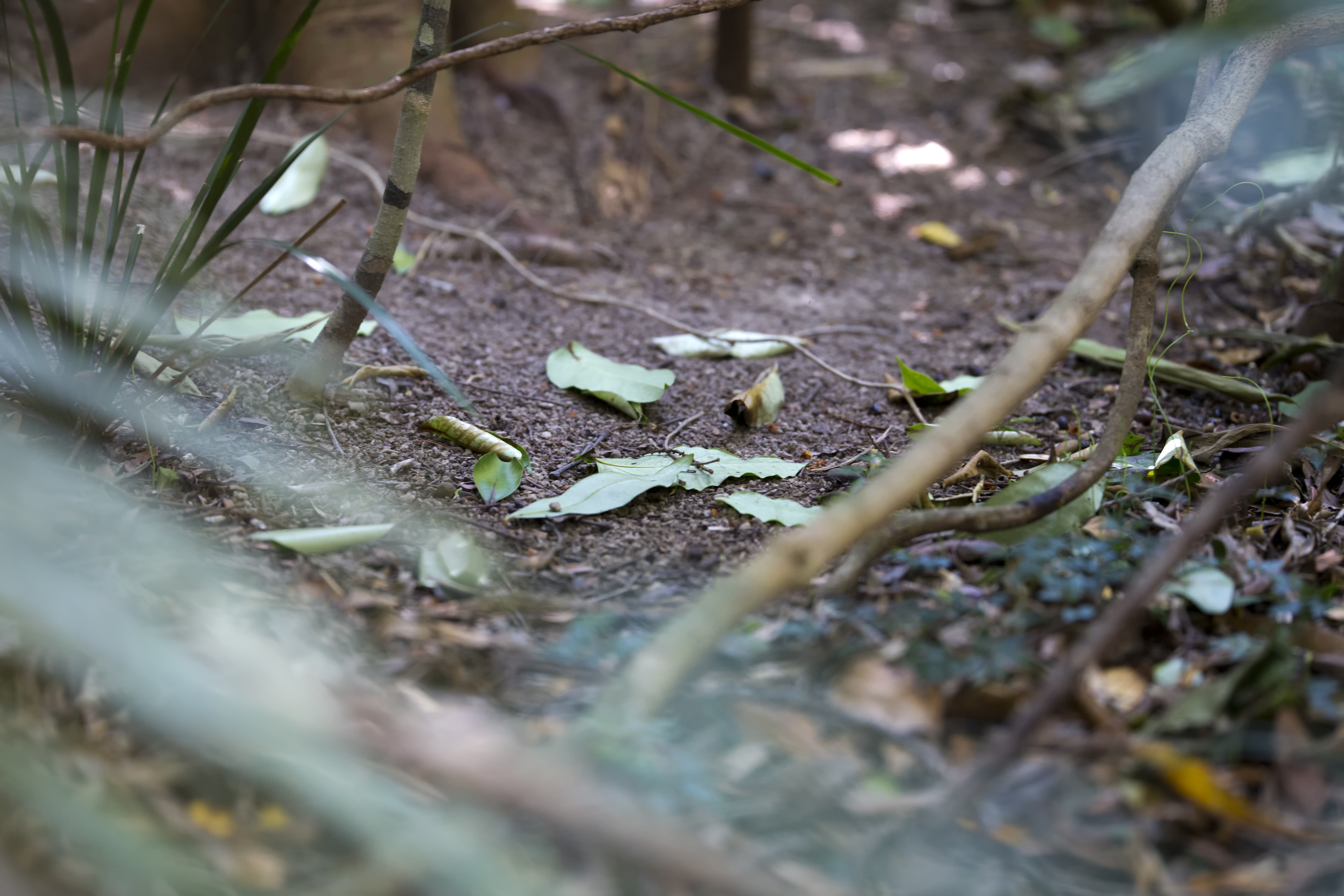
The display-court

== Distribution and habitat ==
The tooth-billed bowerbird is endemic to the mountain forests of northeast Queensland, Australia. Its diet consists mainly of fruits and young leaves of forest trees.

== Behaviour ==
=== Breeding ===
The male is polygamous and builds a display-court or "stage-type bower" (hence the alternate name stagemaker), decorated with fresh green leaves laid with their pale undersides facing up. The leaves are collected by the male by chewing through the leaf stalk and old leaves are removed from the display-court. The display-court consists of a cleared area containing at least one tree trunk used by the male for perching. Upon the approach of a female the male drops to the ground and displays.

== Conservation status ==
A common species in its limited habitat and range, the tooth-billed bowerbird is evaluated as near threatened on the IUCN Red List of Threatened Species.

Mimicking spangled drongo, Lake Barrine, North Queensland, Australia

== Sources ==
- Pizzey, G and Knight, F. (1997). "The Field Guide to Birds of Australia". Angus and Robertson. Sydney.
