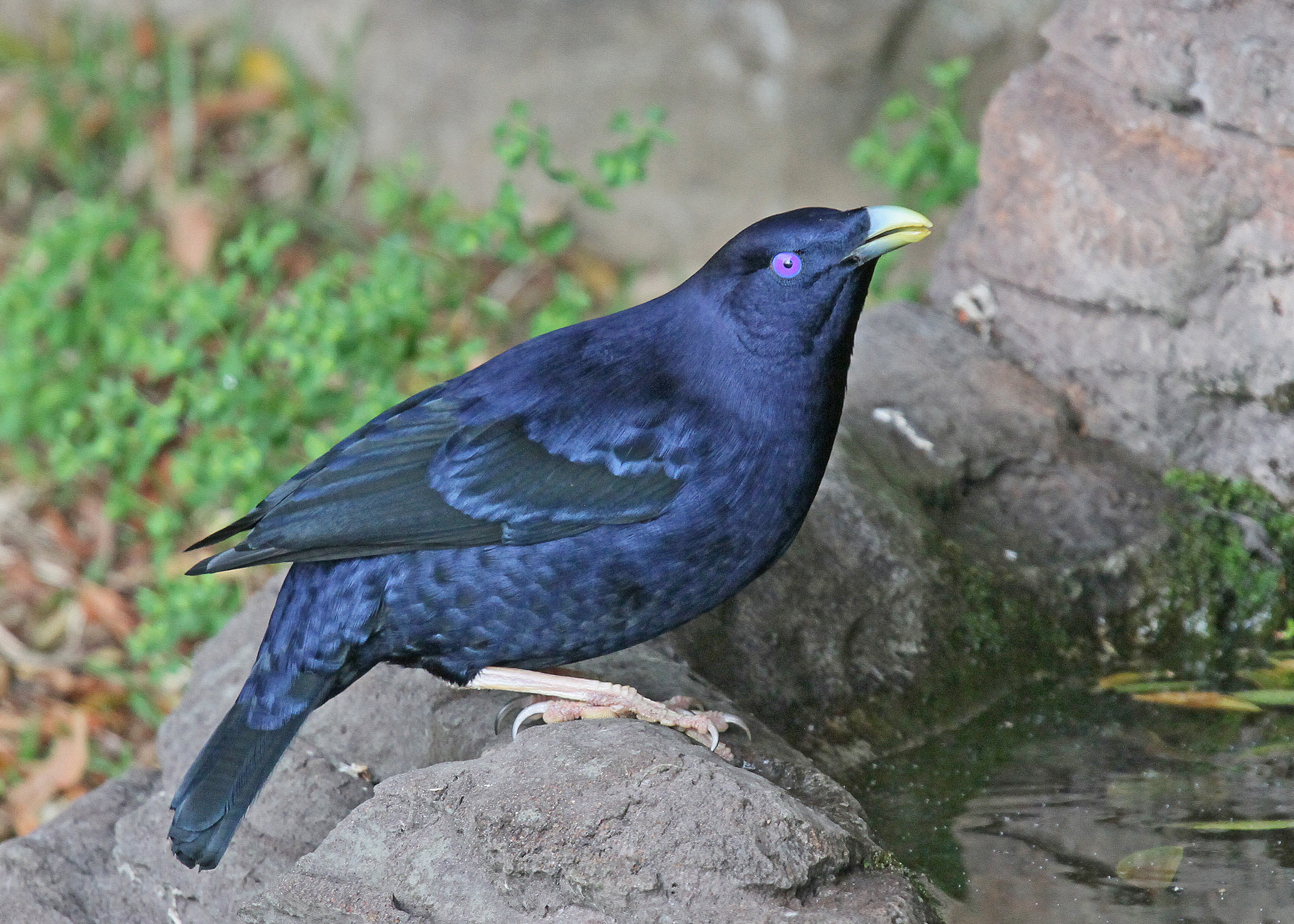
- Male satin bowerbird Ptilonorhynchus violaceus

Scientific classification
- Kingdom: Animalia
- Phylum: Chordata
- Class: Aves
- Order: Passeriformes
- Suborder: Passeri
- Infraorder: Climacterides
- Family: Ptilonorhynchidae; G.R. Gray, 1841

Type genus
- Ptilonorhynchus Kuhl, 1820

Genera
- Ailuroedus; Amblyornis; Archboldia; Chlamydera; Prionodura; Ptilonorhynchus; Scenopoeetes; Sericulus

= Bowerbird =

Bowerbirds Temporal range: Late Oligocene-present 26–0 Ma

Family of birds

Bowerbirds (/ˈbaʊ.ərbɜːrd/) make up the bird family Ptilonorhynchidae. They are renowned for their unique courtship behaviour, where males build a structure and decorate it with sticks and brightly coloured objects in an attempt to attract a mate.

The family has 23 species in eight genera. These are medium to large-sized passerines, ranging from the golden bowerbird at 22 cm (8.7 in) and 70 g (2.5 oz) to the great bowerbird at 40 cm (16 in) and 230 g (8.1 oz). Their diet consists mainly of fruit but may also include insects (especially for nestlings), flowers, nectar and leaves in some species. The satin and spotted bowerbirds are sometimes considered agricultural pests due to their habit of feeding on introduced fruit and vegetable crops and have occasionally been killed by affected orchardists.

The bowerbirds have an Australo-Papuan distribution, with ten species endemic to New Guinea, eight endemic to Australia, and two found in both. Although their distribution is centered on the tropical regions of New Guinea and northern Australia, some species extend into central, western, and southeastern Australia. They occupy a range of different habitats, including rainforest, eucalyptus and acacia forest, and shrublands. While the females are unequivocally drab, in some species the males have bright golden-yellow and sometimes black markings.

One group with particularly inconspicuous plumage in males as well as females, but loud meowing calls, is known as "catbirds". Note that the ptilonorhynchid catbirds, the grey catbird (Dumetella carolinensis) and black catbird (Melanoptila glabrirostris) from the Americas, and the Abyssinian catbird (Sylvia=Parophasma galinieri) from Africa, are only related by their common name; they belong to different families.

== Behaviour and ecology ==
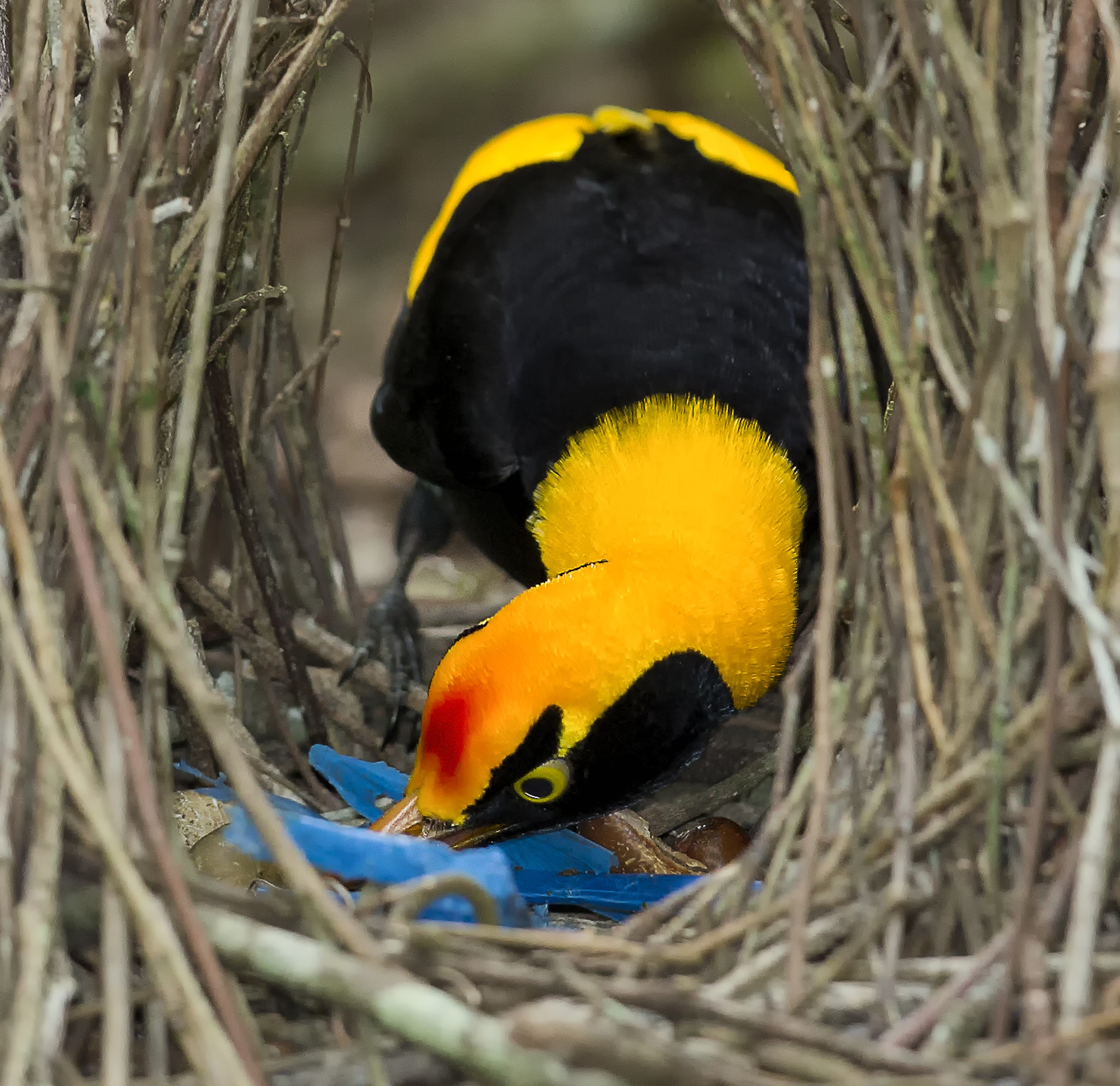
A regent bowerbird arranging items in its bower.

The Ailuroedus catbirds are monogamous, with males raising chicks with their partners, but all other bowerbirds are polygynous, with the female building the nest and raising the young alone. These latter species are commonly dimorphic, with the female being drabber in color. Female bowerbirds build a nest by laying soft materials, such as leaves, ferns, and vine tendrils, on top of a loose foundation of sticks.

All Papuan bowerbirds lay one egg, while Australian species lay one to three with laying intervals of two days. Bowerbird eggs are around twice the weight of those of most passerines of similar size – for instance eggs of the satin bowerbird weigh around 19 g (0.67 oz) as against a calculated 10 g (0.35 oz) for a passerine weighing 150 g (5.3 oz). Eggs hatch after 19 to 24 days, depending on the species and are a plain cream color for catbirds and the tooth-billed bowerbird, but in other species possess brownish wavy lines similar to eggs of Australo-Papuan babblers. In accordance with their lengthy incubation periods, bowerbirds that lay more than one egg have asynchronous hatching, but siblicide has never been observed.

Bowerbirds as a group have the longest life expectancy of any passerine family with significant banding studies. The two most studied species, the green catbird and satin bowerbird, have life expectancies of around eight to ten years and one satin bowerbird has been known to live for twenty-six years. For comparison, the common raven, the heaviest passerine species with significant banding records, has not been known to live longer than 21 years.

=== Courtship and mating ===
The most notable characteristic of bowerbirds is their extraordinarily complex courtship and mating behaviour, where males build a bower to attract mates. There are two main types of bowers. Prionodura, Amblyornis, Scenopoeetes and Archiboldia bowerbirds build so-called maypole bowers, which are constructed by placing sticks around a sapling; in the former two species these bowers have a hut-like roof. Chlamydera, Sericulus and Ptilonorhynchus bowerbirds build an avenue-type bower made of two walls of vertically placed sticks. Ailuroedus catbirds are the only species which do not construct either bowers or display courts. In and around the bower, the male places a variety of brightly colored objects he has collected. These objects — usually different among each species — may include hundreds of shells, leaves, flowers, feathers, stones, berries, and even discarded plastic items, coins, nails, rifle shells, or pieces of glass. The males spend hours arranging this collection. Bowers within a species share a general form but do show significant variation, and the collection of objects reflects the biases of males of each species and its ability to procure items from the habitat, often stealing them from neighboring bowers. Several studies of different species have shown that colors of decorations males use on their bowers match the preferences of females.

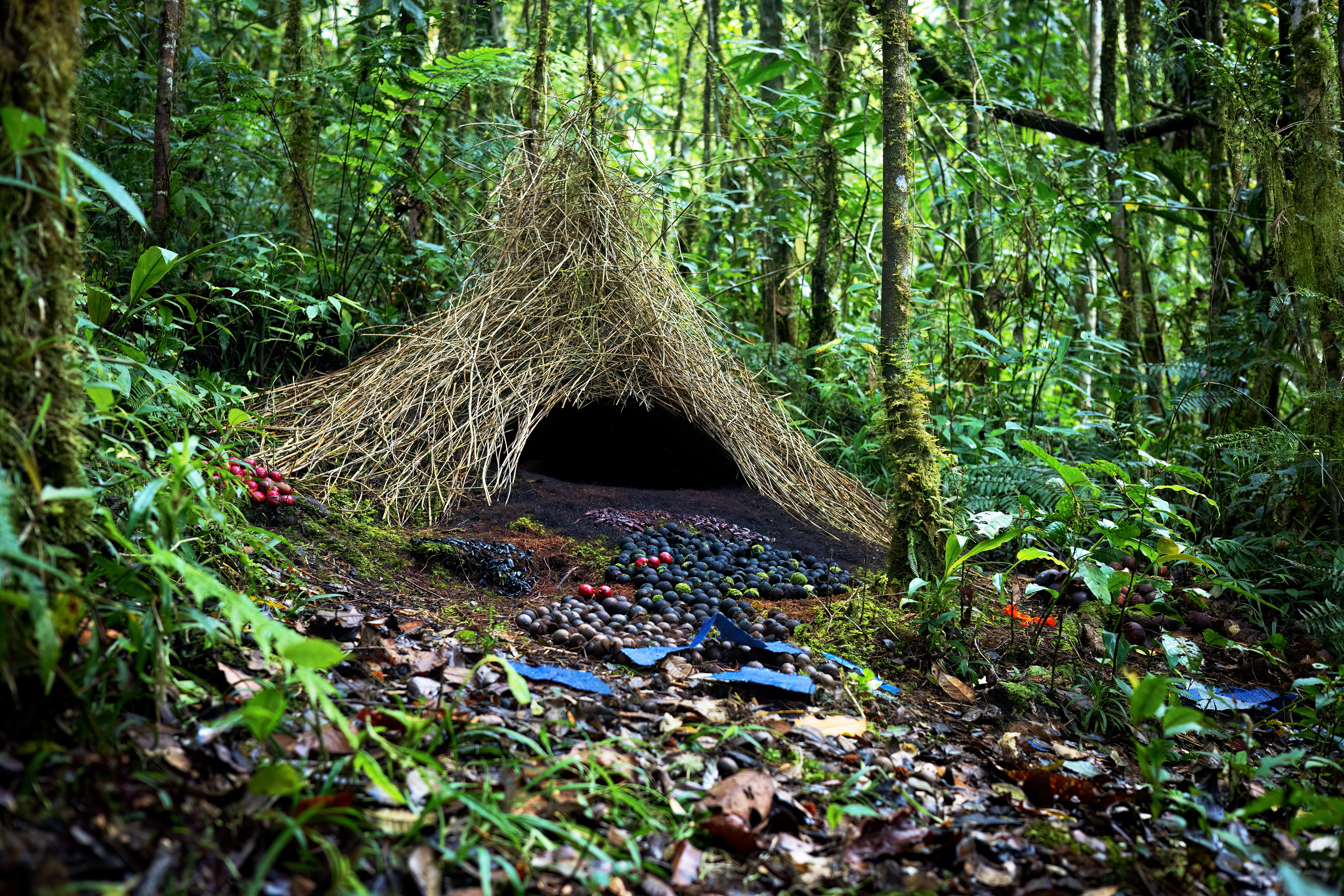
Vogelkop bowerbird bower

In addition to the bower construction and ornamentation, male birds perform involved courtship displays to attract the female. Research suggests the male adjusts his performance based on success and female response.

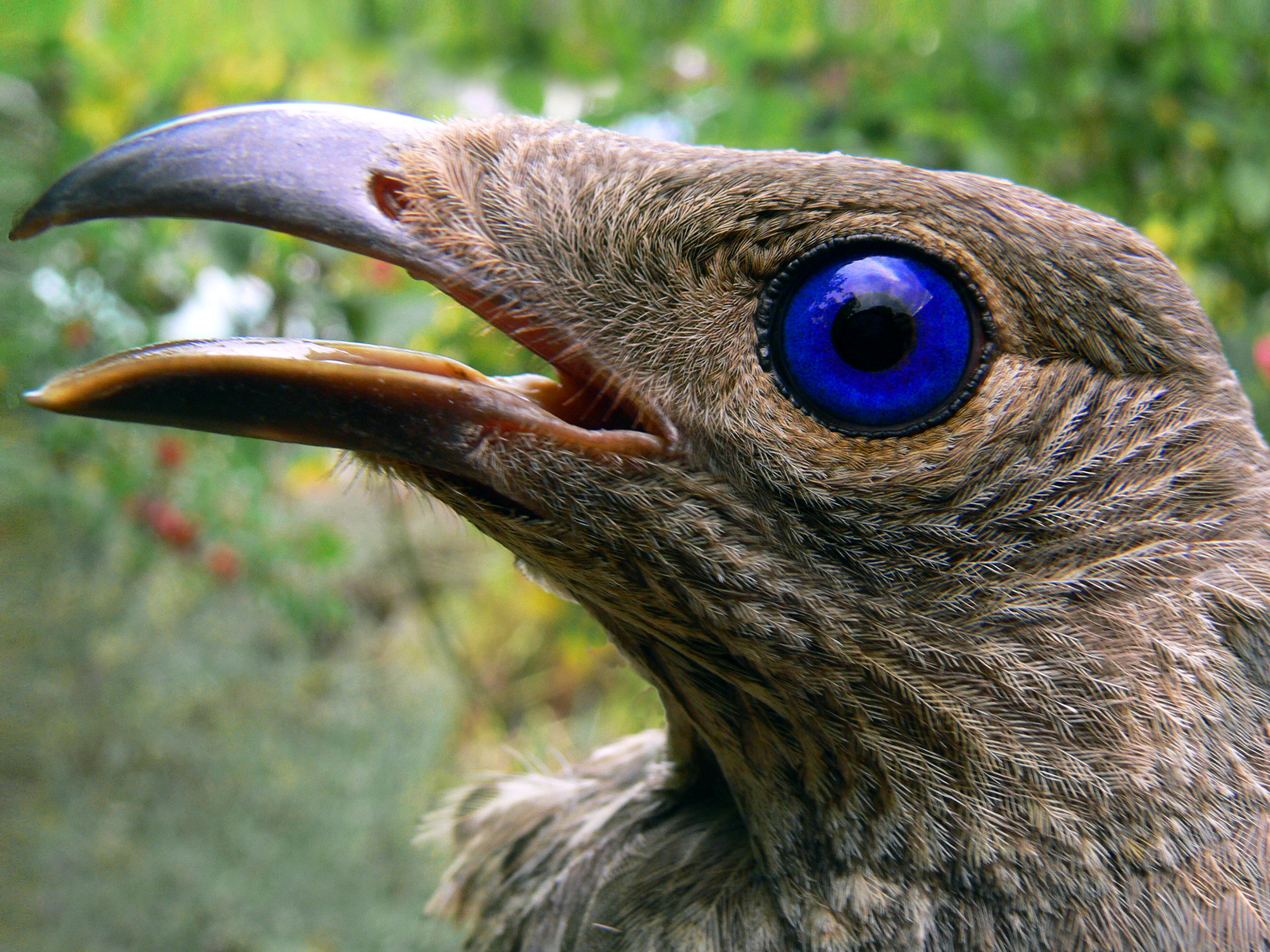
Female satin bowerbird

Mate-searching females commonly visit multiple bowers, often returning to preferred bowers several times, and watching males' elaborate courtship displays and inspecting the quality of the bower. Through this process the female reduces the set of potential mates. Many females end up selecting the same male, and many under-performing males are left without copulations. Females mated with top-mating males tend to return to the male the next year and search less.

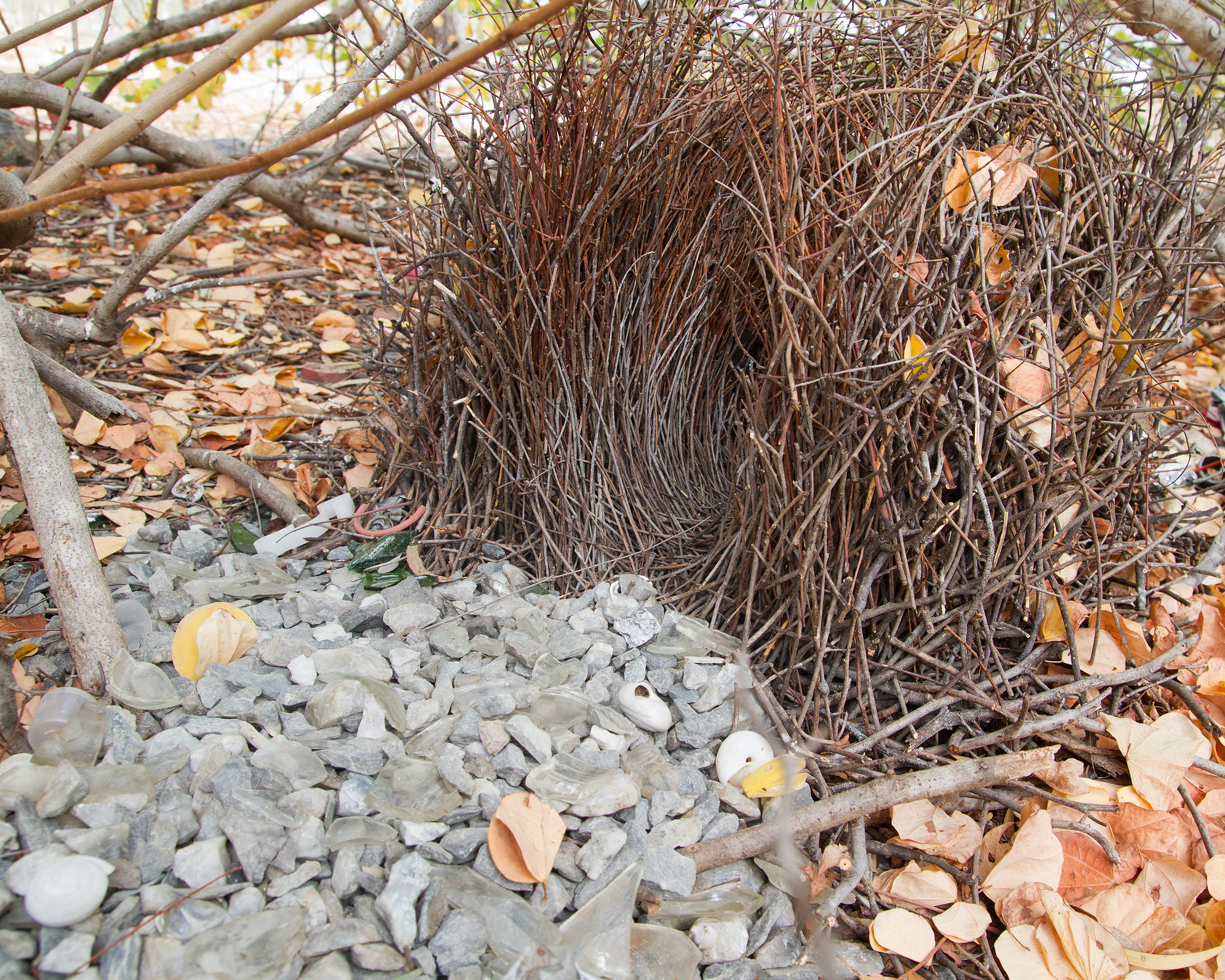
Bower of a great bowerbird

It has been suggested that there is an inverse relationship between bower complexity and the brightness of plumage. There may be an evolutionary "transfer" of ornamentation in some species, from their plumage to their bowers, in order to reduce the visibility of the male and thereby its vulnerability to predation. This hypothesis is not well supported because species with vastly different bower types have similar plumage. Others have suggested that the bower functioned initially as a device that benefits females by protecting them from forced copulations and thus giving them enhanced opportunity to choose males and benefits males by enhancing female willingness to visit the bower. Evidence supporting this hypothesis comes from observations of Archbold's bowerbirds that have no true bower and have greatly modified their courtship so that the male is limited in his ability to mount the female without her cooperation. In tooth-billed bowerbirds that have no bowers, males may capture females out of the air and forcibly copulate with them. Once this initial function was established, bowers were then co-opted by females for other functions such as use in assessing males based on the quality of bower construction. Recent studies with robot female bowerbirds have shown that males react to female signals of discomfort during courtship by reducing the intensity of their potentially threatening courtship. Young females tend to be more easily threatened by intense male courtship, and these females tend to choose males based on traits not dependent on male courtship intensity.

The high degree of effort directed at mate choice by females and the large skews in mating success directed at males with quality displays suggests that females gain important benefits from mate choice. Since males have no role in parental care and give nothing to females except sperm, it is suggested that females gain genetic benefits from their mate choice. However, this has not been established, in part because of the difficulty of following offspring performance since males take seven years to reach sexual maturity. One hypothesis for the evolutionary causation of the bower building display is Hamilton and Zuk's "bright bird" hypothesis, which states that sexual ornaments are indicators of general health and heritable disease resistance. Doucet and Montgomerie determined that the male bowerbird's plumage reflectance indicates internal parasitic infection, whereas the bower quality is a measure of external parasitic infection. This would suggest that the bowerbird mating display evolved due to parasite-mediated sexual selection, although there is some controversy surrounding this conclusion.

This complex mating behaviour, with its highly valued types and colors of decorations, has led some researchers to regard the bowerbirds as among the most behaviorally complex species of bird. It also provides some of the most compelling evidence that the extended phenotype of a species can play a role in sexual selection and indeed, act as a powerful mechanism to shape its evolution, as seems to be the case for humans. Inspired by their seemingly extreme courtship rituals, Charles Darwin discussed both bowerbirds and birds-of-paradise in his writings.

In addition, many species of bowerbird are superb vocal mimics. MacGregor's bowerbird, for example, has been observed imitating pigs, waterfalls, and human chatter. Satin bowerbirds commonly mimic other local species as part of their courtship display.

Bowerbirds have also been observed creating optical illusions in their bowers to appeal to mates. They arrange objects in the bower's court area from smallest to largest, creating a forced perspective which holds the attention of the female for longer. Males with objects arranged in a way that have a strong optical illusion are likely to have higher mating success.

== Taxonomy and systematics ==
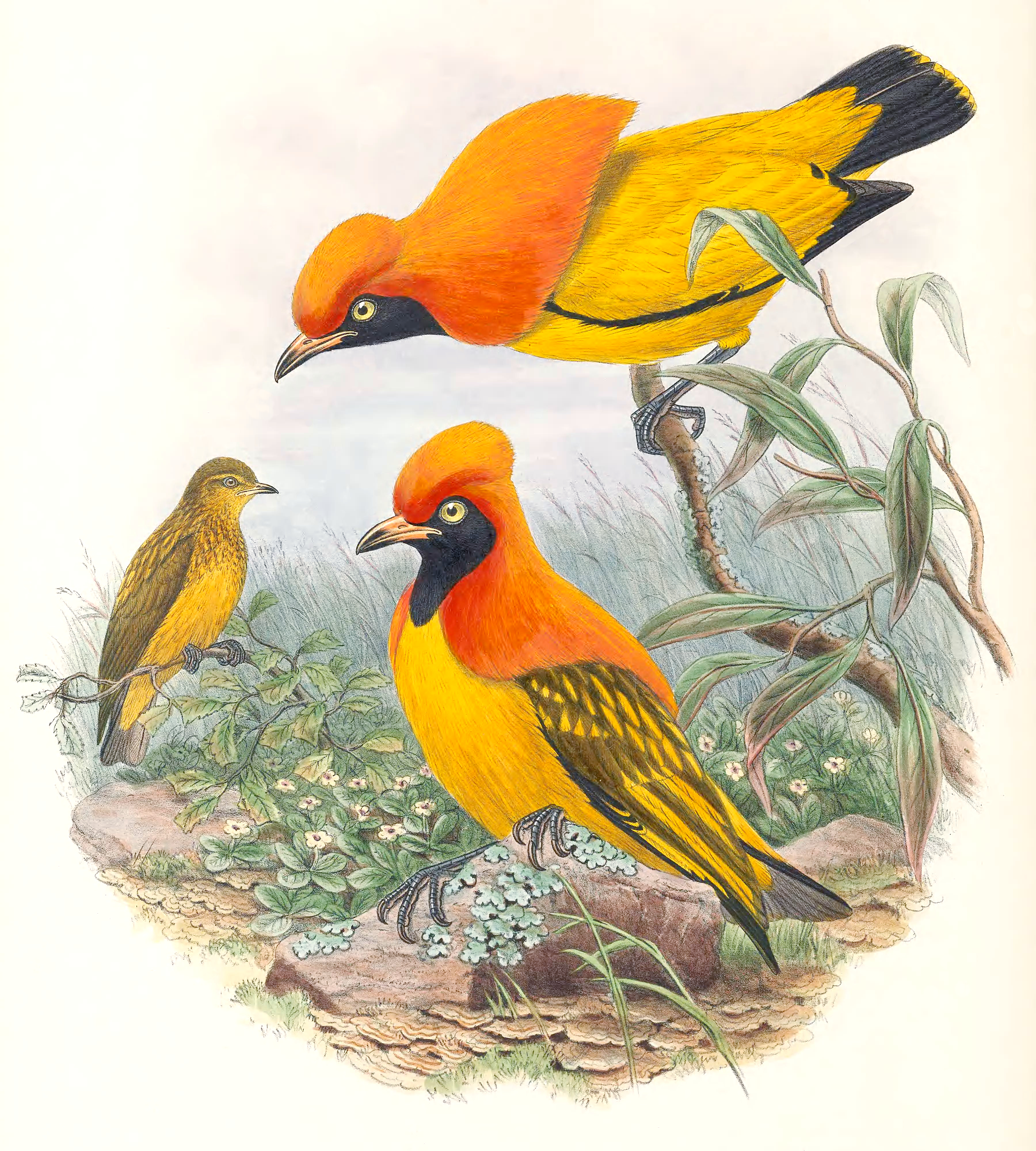
Two males displaying to a female masked bowerbird, Sericulus aureus, illustrated by John Gould (1804–1881)

Though bowerbirds have traditionally been regarded as closely related to the birds of paradise, recent molecular studies suggest that while both families are part of the great corvid radiation that took place in or near Sahul (Australia-New Guinea), the bowerbirds are more distant from the birds of paradise than was once thought. DNA–DNA hybridization studies placed them close to the lyrebirds; however, anatomical evidence appears to contradict this placement, and the true relationship remained unresolved for long. Cladistic analyses in the mid-2010s usually allied bowerbirds with the Australasian treecreepers (Climacteridae), another Sahul endemic family which is highly adapted to a woodpecker-like lifestyle (woodpeckers being absent from Sahul). This putative superfamily forms part of a large basal radiation of ancient songbirds, with the lyrebirds being part of a more ancestral branch than the bowerbirds and their DNA-DNA hybridization similarities being due to the phenetic methodology which (unlike cladistic analysis) merely assesses overall similarity without accounting for convergent evolution.

Many bowerbirds (in particular New Guinean species) are little known and even less studied. But the hypothesized relationships of 3 roughly equally distinct groups and one peculiar species inferred from courtship behaviour and external appearance are by and large confirmed by molecular phylogenetics. Some insights from the more recent studies, however, were less expected: The Tooth-billed catbird, with its unique "stagemaker" courtship, was long suspected not to be a true catbird (genus Ailuroedus). As it turned out, this is not only correct, but in fact the Tooth-billed catbird is robustly resolved by the mtDNA data as more closely related to the "maypole"-type bower builders than to Ailuroedus, and certainly warrants separation in genus Scenopoeetes. Also, the enigmatic "maypole-builder" genus Archboldia seems to be merely a Amblyornis with unusually heavy melanin pigmentation as is often found in tropical rainforest birds. On the other hand, the "avenue-builders" also have a hypermelanic lineage, the satin bowerbird, but this seems well separable as a monotypic genus Ptilonorhynchus, as is the "maypole-building" golden bowerbird (as Prionodura). Interestingly, the widely divergent "avenue-builders" may represent the oldest living lineage, with the monogamous true catbirds, which do not build a bower and were traditionally held to be "primitive", as the most derived group among living bowerbirds – the last common ancestor of the living bowerbirds is hypothesized to have been polygynous, with sexually dimorphic plumage – cryptic greenish in the females, and probably dark with a yellow belly in the males. But overall relationships between the true catbirds, the "maypole-builders" and the "avenue-builders" were not definitely resolvable, with only a small outgroup being used and outgroup effects on intra-family relationships not being tested. Even so, it is precisely this uncertainty about inter-group relationships that strongly suggests that the "maypole"/"avenue" bowers are not one ancestral and one derived type, but evolved independent of one another, perhaps from a "clean stage"-type courtship arena which is commonly established by all bower-building species at the start of bower construction, and persists in little-altered form (just adding some remarkable leaves strewn about as decoration) in Scenopoeetes which almost certainly is the most ancient living lineage of the "maypole-builders". Among the catbirds, the white-cheeked group (A.buccoides/geislerorum/stonii) is very likely the most ancient one, which is also in line with the hypothesis that bowerbirds have become more and more drab and inconspicuous as their evolution progressed.

The cladogram below showing the relationships between the genera is based on a molecular phylogenetic study by Per Ericson and collaborators that was published in 2020. The genus Archboldia was found to be embedded in the genus Amblyornis.

- Ptilonorhynchidae
  - - Sericulus – 4 species
    - - Ptilonorhynchus – satin bowerbird
      - Chlamydera – 5 species
  - - Ailuroedus – 6 species: catbirds
    - - Scenopoeetes – tooth-billed bowerbird
      - - Prionodura – golden bowerbird
        - Amblyornis – 4 species + Archboldia – Archbold's bowerbird

=== Genera and species ===
True catbirds
Genus Ailuroedus

- Ochre-breasted catbird, Ailuroedus stonii
- White-eared catbird, Ailuroedus buccoides
- Tan-capped catbird, Ailuroedus geislerorum
- Green catbird, Ailuroedus crassirostris
- Spotted catbird, Ailuroedus maculosus
- Black-eared catbird, Ailuroedus melanotis

Maypole-builders (including Tooth-billed bowerbird)
Genus Scenopoeetes

- Tooth-billed bowerbird, Scenopoeetes dentirostris

Genus Archboldia

- Archbold's bowerbird, Archboldia papuensis

Genus Amblyornis

- Vogelkop bowerbird, Amblyornis inornata
- MacGregor's bowerbird, Amblyornis macgregoriae
- Streaked bowerbird, Amblyornis subalaris
- Golden-fronted bowerbird, Amblyornis flavifrons

Genus Prionodura

- Golden bowerbird, Prionodura newtoniana

Avenue-builders
Genus Sericulus

- Flame bowerbird, Sericulus ardens
- Masked bowerbird, Sericulus aureus
- Fire-maned bowerbird, Sericulus bakeri
- Regent bowerbird, Sericulus chrysocephalus

Genus Ptilonorhynchus

- Satin bowerbird, Ptilonorhynchus violaceus

Genus Chlamydera

- Western bowerbird, Chlamydera guttata
- Spotted bowerbird, Chlamydera maculata
- Great bowerbird, Chlamydera nuchalis
  - Eastern great bowerbird, Chlamydera (nuchalis) orientalis (possibly a distinct species)
- Yellow-breasted bowerbird, Chlamydera lauterbachi
- Fawn-breasted bowerbird, Chlamydera cerviniventris

=== Fossil record ===
Bowerbirds have a scant fossil record that nonetheless extends to the Chattian (latest Oligocene), with the fossil species Sericuloides marynguyenae dated to 26 to 23 million years ago. It was found in Faunal Zone A deposits of the White Hunter Site at D-site Plateau of the Riversleigh World Heritage Area. S. marynguyenae was a tiny member of its family, about the same size as the golden bowerbird. It is known from the proximal end of a right carpometacarpus and the proximal end of a left tarsometatarsus. The material, though fragmentary, preserves much detail, and is overall more similar to the "avenue-builders" – in particular Chlamydera – than to the other two main groups. However, the splits between the three main groups of living bowerbirds are presumed to have occurred only in the Miocene, some time after Sericuloides lived. Thus, the fossil species may have belonged to a more basal and now entirely extinct lineage, and/or it may be considered to support the hypothesis that the "avenue-builders" are the most ancient group of bowerbirds and retain many "primitive" features in their anatomy.

Other than S. marynguyenae, as of 2025 only one other certain prehistoric bowerbird species is known. This has not been named, as it is only known from the distal left ulna piece QM F57970 (AR19857), also found on the D-site Plateau of Riversleigh WHA, but in interval 3 of Faunal Zone B at the Ross Scott-Orr site, in late early Miocene (Burdigalian) sediments dated to 16.55 mya. Even though this piece of fossil bone is merely some 16 mm long, it is excellently preserved, and its features are characteristic of a smallish bowerbird the size of a black-eared catbird. Bowerbird ulnae – to the extent they have been studied – differ little between genera and species, but the Miocene fossil is unlike all living members of the family in one detail or another. If anything, it resembles the presumably more advanced groups ("maypole-builders" and true catbirds) more than the "avenue-builders" and given its age it may well have been one of the earliest members of either of the former two groups. A third possible fossil bowerbird, Aeviperditus gracilis, was described in 2025 from fossils found in St Bathans, New Zealand. The species, from the Miocene, has a tarsometatarsus that is similar in appearance to the bowerbirds, albeit more slender. Further fossils are needed to confirm it is a bowerbird, but if it is, it would show that the family once had a wider distribution.
