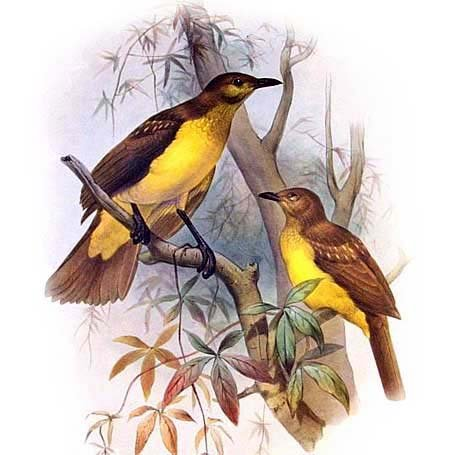

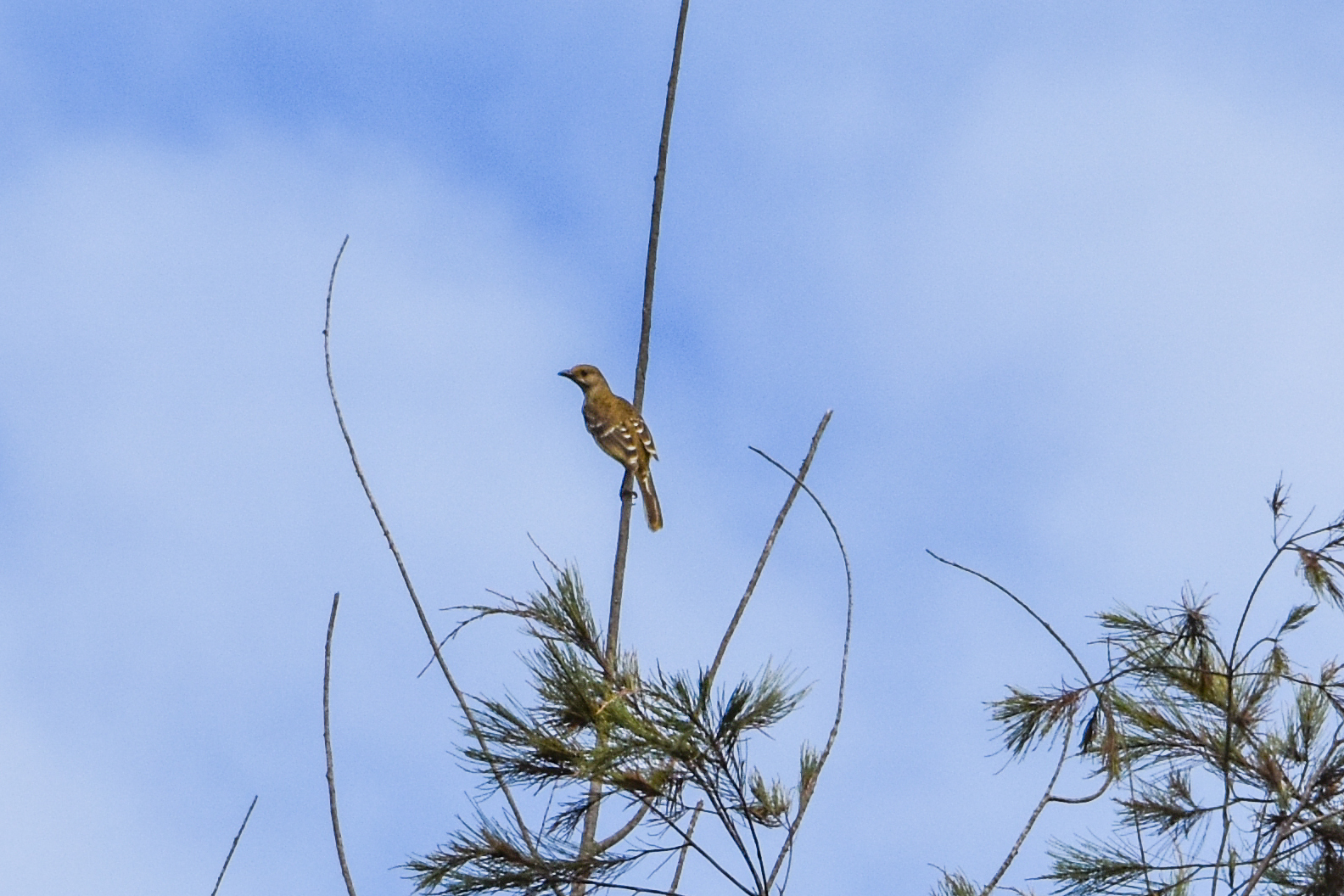

Conservation status
- Least Concern (IUCN 3.1)

Scientific classification
- Kingdom: Animalia
- Phylum: Chordata
- Class: Aves
- Order: Passeriformes
- Family: Ptilonorhynchidae
- Genus: Chlamydera
- Species: C. lauterbachi

Binomial name
- Chlamydera lauterbachi Reichenow, 1897

= Yellow-breasted bowerbird =

Species of bird

The yellow-breasted bowerbird (Chlamydera lauterbachi) also known as Lauterbach's bowerbird, is a medium-sized, approximately 27 cm long, bowerbird with a brownish-olive upperparts plumage, grayish-yellow upper breast, coppery crown, dark brown iris, yellow underparts, a black bill and pinkish-orange mouth. Both sexes are similar. The female exhibits less vibrant coloration than the male.

== Habitat ==
The yellow-breasted bowerbird is distributed on mainland New Guinea, where it inhabits grasslands, lowlands, and subtropical mountain forests. Its diet mainly consists of fruits, caterpillars, beetles, and other insects. The nest is a shallow cup made of small sticks located in a tree. The bower itself is of the "avenue" type, with four walls made of sticks and an outward-angled main avenue wall.

The scientific name commemorates its discoverer, the German botanist Carl Lauterbach. He discovered this bowerbird in 1896.

Widespread and a common species throughout its habitat range, the yellow-breasted bowerbird is evaluated as Least Concern on the IUCN Red List of Threatened Species.
