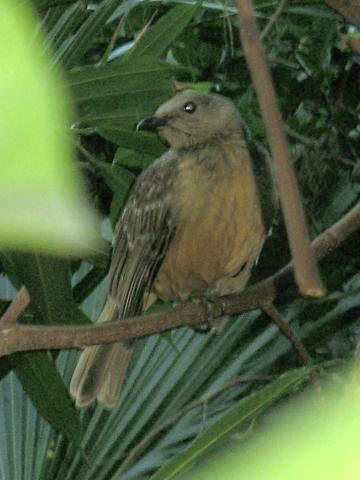
- Fawn-breasted bowerbird (Chlamydera cerviniventris)

Scientific classification
- Kingdom: Animalia
- Phylum: Chordata
- Class: Aves
- Order: Passeriformes
- Family: Ptilonorhynchidae
- Genus: Chlamydera; Gould, 1837

Type species
- Calodera maculata Gould, 1837

= Chlamydera =

Genus of birds

Chlamydera is a genus of passerine birds in the bowerbird family Ptilonorhynchidae that are found in Australia and New Guinea.

The birds in this genus build "avenue-type" bowers which consist of two parallel walls made of vertical sticks and pieces of grass.

== Taxonomy ==
The genus Chlamydera was introduced in 1837 by the English ornithologist John Gould to accommodate Calodera maculata Gould, the spotted bowerbird, which is therefore the type species by monotypy. The genus name combines the Ancient Greek χλαμυς/khlamus meaning "short cloak" with δερα/dera meaning "neck".

=== Species ===
The genus contains five species:

Image	Name	Common name
	Chlamydera cerviniventris	Fawn-breasted bowerbird
	Chlamydera guttata	Western bowerbird
	Chlamydera nuchalis	Great bowerbird
	Chlamydera lauterbachi	Yellow-breasted bowerbird
	Chlamydera maculata	Spotted bowerbird
