= Nggamadi =

Aboriginal Australian people

The Nggamadi were an indigenous Australian people of the Cape York Peninsula of northern Queensland.

== Name ==
They are often conflated with the Ankamuti, (Note: "Crowley (1983: 310) has established that some of these names are variant representations of the name of a language distinguished as either Nggammadi (var. Gamati, Gâmete, Gametty, Ngkamadyi, Nggamadi, Ngammatti), which is a form used by the initial CV-dropping speakers south of Port Musgrave or as Angkamuthi (var. Ankamati/Angkamuthi/Angkamuti/Anggamudi/An'Gamoti).") but Tindale regarded them as a separate tribal reality. Terry Crowley writes:

In the region referred to locally as the "Seven Rivers" area (the seven rivers being the Jardine, MacDonald, Skardon, Doughboy, Ducie and Jackson Rivers, and Crystal Creek), which constitutes the very narrow coastal stretch from the northern side of Port Musgrave as far as the Doughboy River, and also the inland area of Crystal Creek and the middle Jardine River, were the aŋkamuṯi -speaking people. The non-coastal aŋkamuṯi of the Jardine River were alternatively called yampaɣuƫaŋu or utuðanamu (meaning "leaf people" and "scrub dwellers" respectively). The aŋkamuṯi have previously been referred to in the literature by the name ŋkamuṯi (Gamiti in Roth 1910:96), Ngkamadyi in McConnel (1939-1940:60) and Nggammadi in Sharp (1939:257), which was used for the aŋkamuṯi by the CV-dropping groups to the south of Port Musgrave (Crowley 1981:146).

== Country ==
Norman Tindale estimated that the Nggamadi had about 750 square miles (1,900 km^{2}) of territory. They lay north of the Dulhunty River as far as around Vrilya Point (Cockatoo Creek), and were present also at the Jackson and Skardon rivers.

== Alternative names ==
- Ngkamadyi
- Ngammatti
- Nggamiti
- Ngamiti
- Ngammatta
- Gamete
- Gamiti
- Gametty
- Gomokudin

== Sources ==
- Crowley, Terry (1983). "Uradhi". In Dixon, Robert M. W.; Blake, Barry J. (eds.). Handbook of Australian languages. Vol. 3. Australian National University Press. pp. 306–428. ISBN 978-9-027-22005-9.
- Mathews, R. H. (1900). "Some tribes of Cape York Peninsula". Proceedings of the Royal Society of New South Wales. 34: 131–135.
- McConnel, Ursula H. (September 1939). "Social Organization of the Tribes of Cape York Peninsula, North Queensland". Oceania. 10 (1): 54–72. doi:10.1002/j.1834-4461.1939.tb00256.x. JSTOR 40327744.
- McConnel, Ursula H. (June 1940). "Social Organization of the Tribes of Cape York Peninsula, North Queensland (Continued)". Oceania. 10 (4): 434–455. doi:10.1002/j.1834-4461.1940.tb00305.x. JSTOR 40327867.
- McGillivray, John (1852). Narrative of the voyage of H.M.S. Rattlesnake, commanded by the late Captain Owen Stanley during the years 1846-50, including discoveries and surveys in New Guinea, the Louisiade Archipelago, etc: to which is added Mr. E.B. Kennedy's expedition for the exploration of the Cape York Peninsula (PDF). London: T. & W. Boone.
- Powell, Fiona (2014). "Locating Seven Rivers". In Clark, Ian D.; Hercus, Luise; Kostanski, Laura (eds.). Indigenous and Minority Placenames: Australian and International Perspectives. Australian National University Press. pp. 123–146. ISBN 9781925021622. JSTOR j.ctt13www5z.10.
- Thomson, Donald F. (1933). "The Hero Cult, Initiation and Totemism on Cape York". The Journal of the Royal Anthropological Institute of Great Britain and Ireland. 63: 453–537. doi:10.2307/2843801. JSTOR 2843801.
- Thomson, Donald F. (1934). "Notes on a Hero Cult from the Gulf of Carpentaria, North Queensland". The Journal of the Royal Anthropological Institute of Great Britain and Ireland. 64: 217–235. doi:10.2307/2843808. JSTOR 2843808.
- Tindale, Norman Barnett (1974). "Nggamadi (QLD)". Aboriginal Tribes of Australia: Their Terrain, Environmental Controls, Distribution, Limits, and Proper Names. Australian National University Press. ISBN 978-0-708-10741-6.
