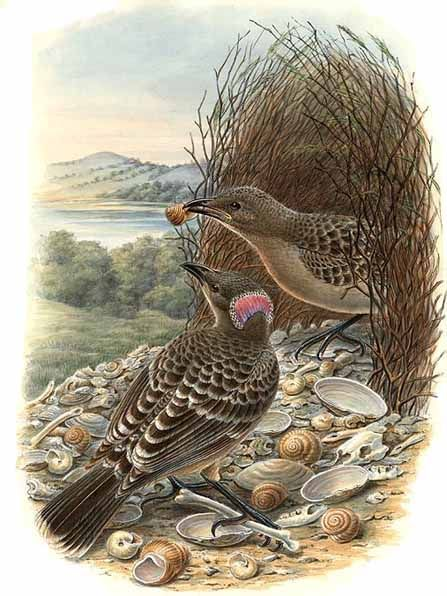

Conservation status
- Least Concern (IUCN 3.1)

Scientific classification
- Kingdom: Animalia
- Phylum: Chordata
- Class: Aves
- Order: Passeriformes
- Family: Ptilonorhynchidae
- Genus: Chlamydera
- Species: C. nuchalis

Binomial name
- Chlamydera nuchalis (Jardine & Selby, 1830)

= Great bowerbird =

Species of bird

The great bowerbird (Chlamydera nuchalis) is a common and conspicuous resident of northern Australia, from the area around Broome across the Top End to Cape York Peninsula and as far south as Mount Isa and Townsville. Favoured habitat is a broad range of forest and woodland, and the margins of vine forests, monsoon forest, and mangrove swamps.

As with most members of the bowerbird family, breeding considerations dominate the lifecycle: females nest inconspicuously and raise their young alone, while the males spend most of the year building, maintaining, improving, defending, and above all displaying from their bowers. Only a male with a successful bower can attract mates.

The great bowerbird is the largest of the bowerbird family and is 33 to 38 cm long and fawny grey in colour. Males have a small but conspicuous pink crest on the nape of the neck.

== Bower ==
The bower is a twin-walled avenue-type bower approximately 1 metre long and 45 cm high. It is typically located under a shrub or leafy branch. The ends of the bower are scattered with white and green objects - stones, bones, shells and leaves and small man-made objects such as plastic and bottle caps. Within the bower itself, clear glass is sometimes placed.

Uniquely among bowerbirds, groups of young males will attend a single bower concurrently, "practising" their bower-building skills prior to establishing their own bower for mating purposes.

== Display ==
The males most often perform their display at the north platform of the north–south oriented bowers. During peak mating hours in the early morning, this orientation reflects the most light off of the male's bright lavender nuchal crest, showing off this impressive plumage. Usually the male will hold a colored object in his mouth while bobbing his head up and down during the display.

== Gallery ==
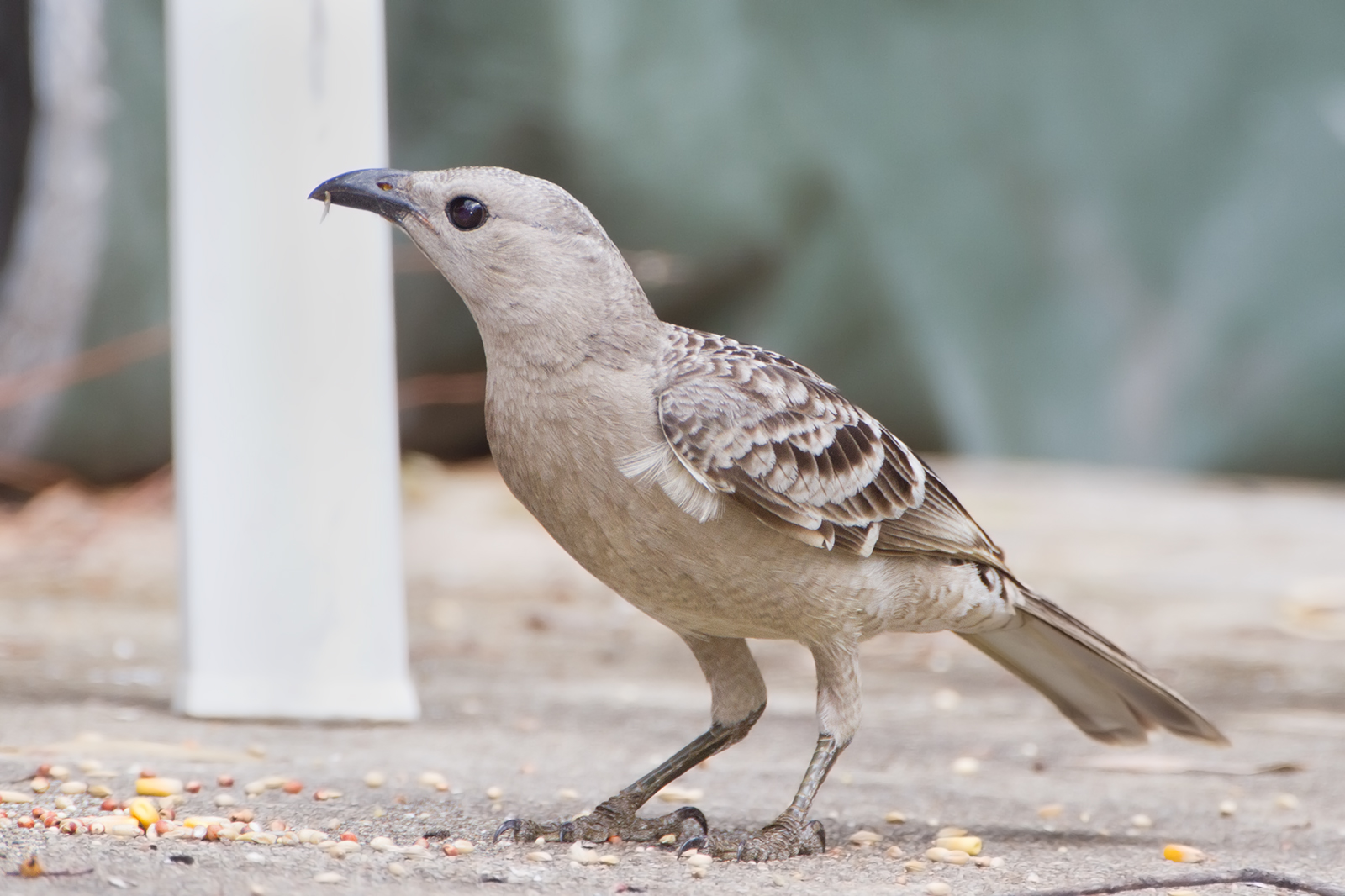
Adult

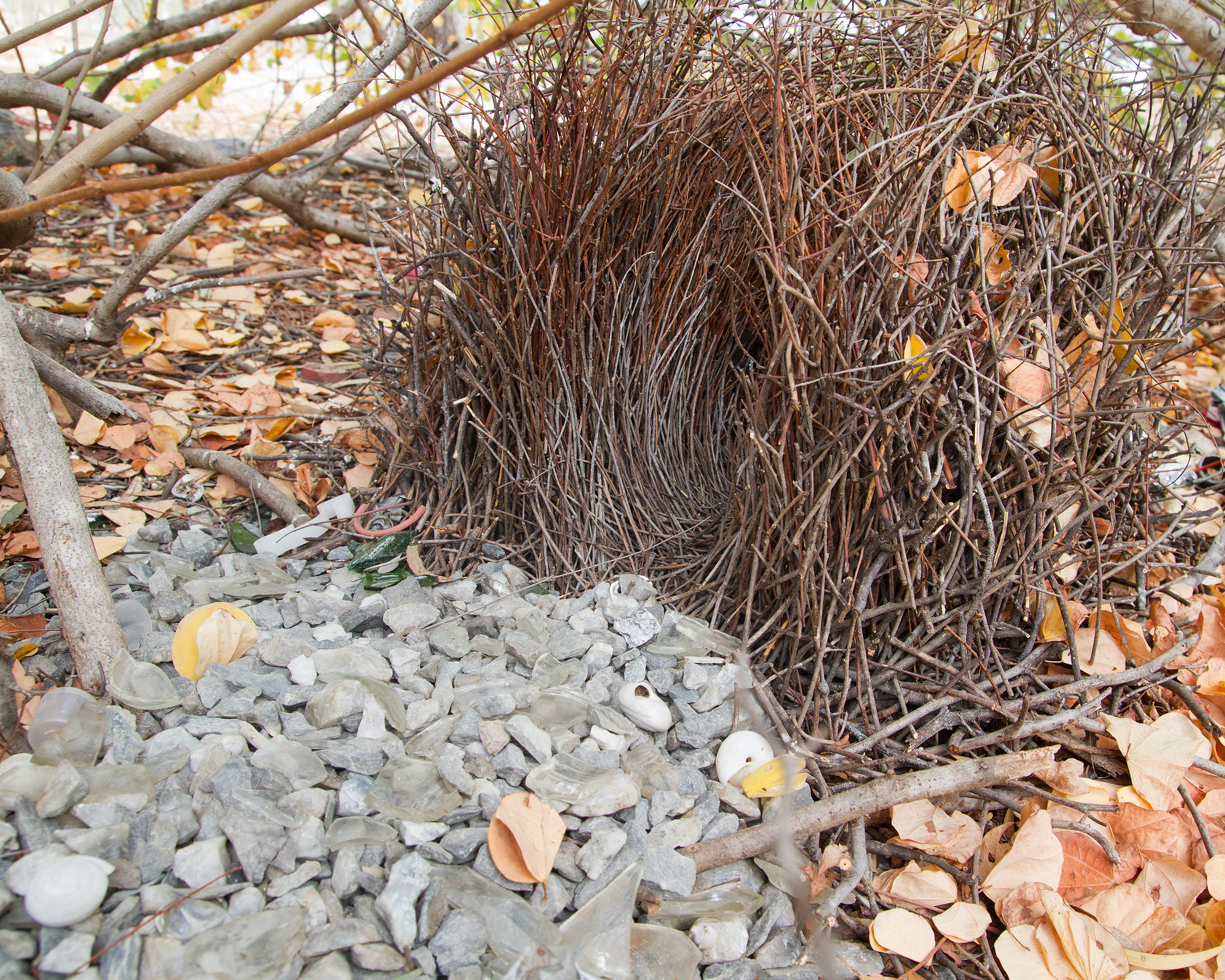
Bower

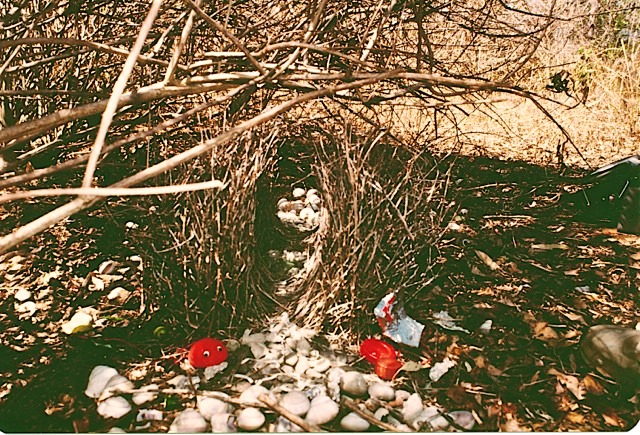
Bower near Cooktown, Australia

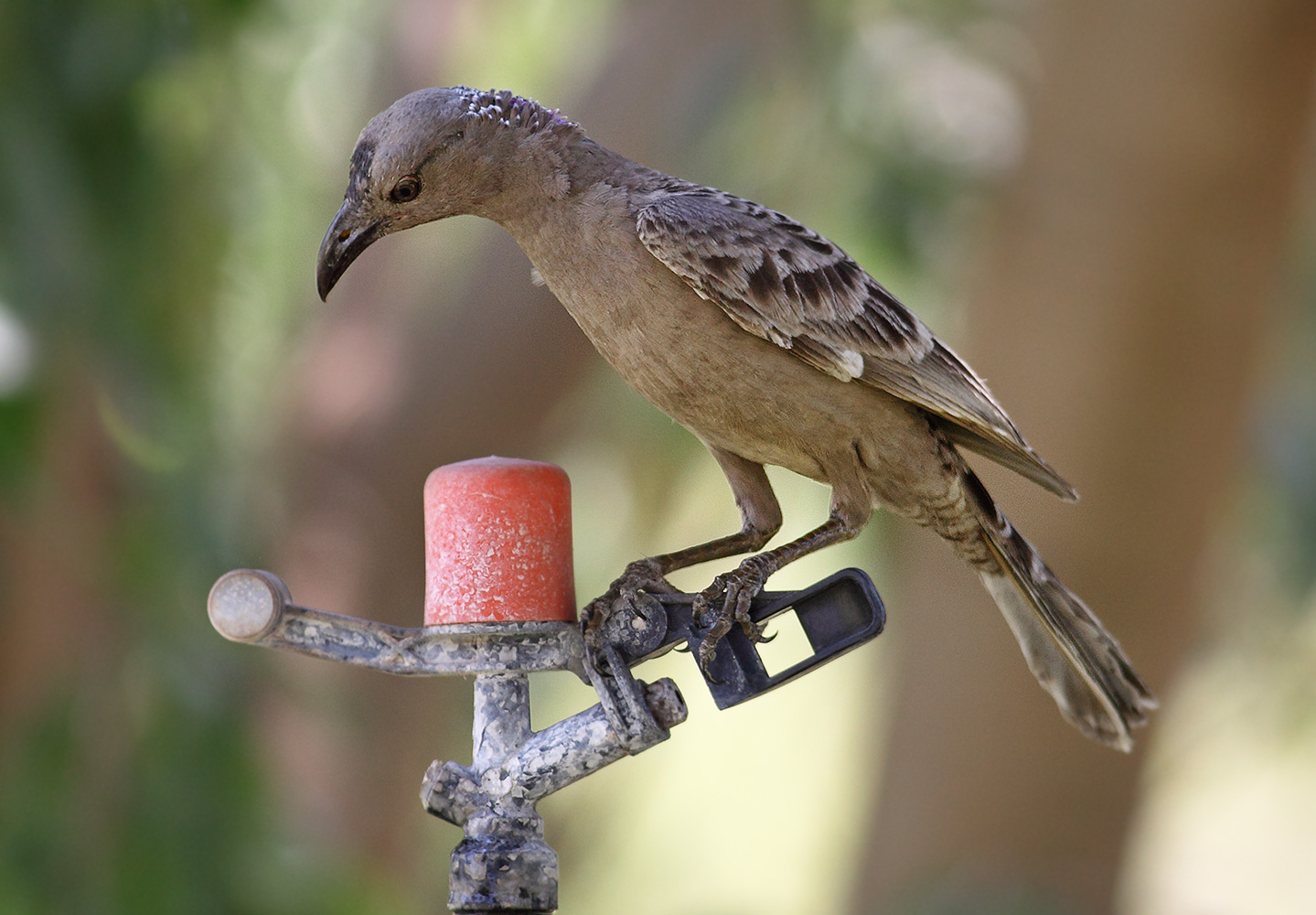
Male showing beginnings of bright plumage on nape of neck
