= Catbird =

Group of birds

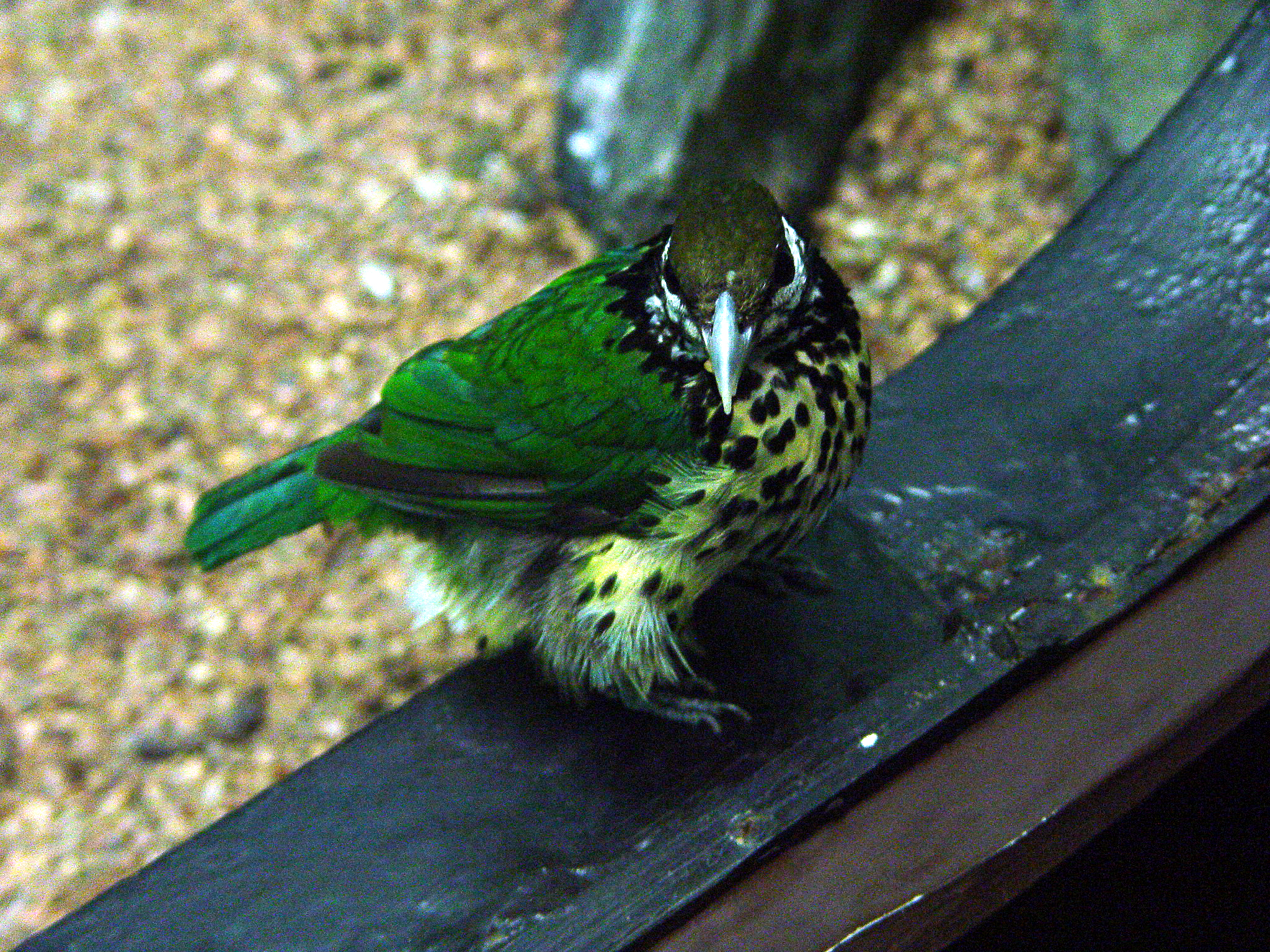
White-eared catbird

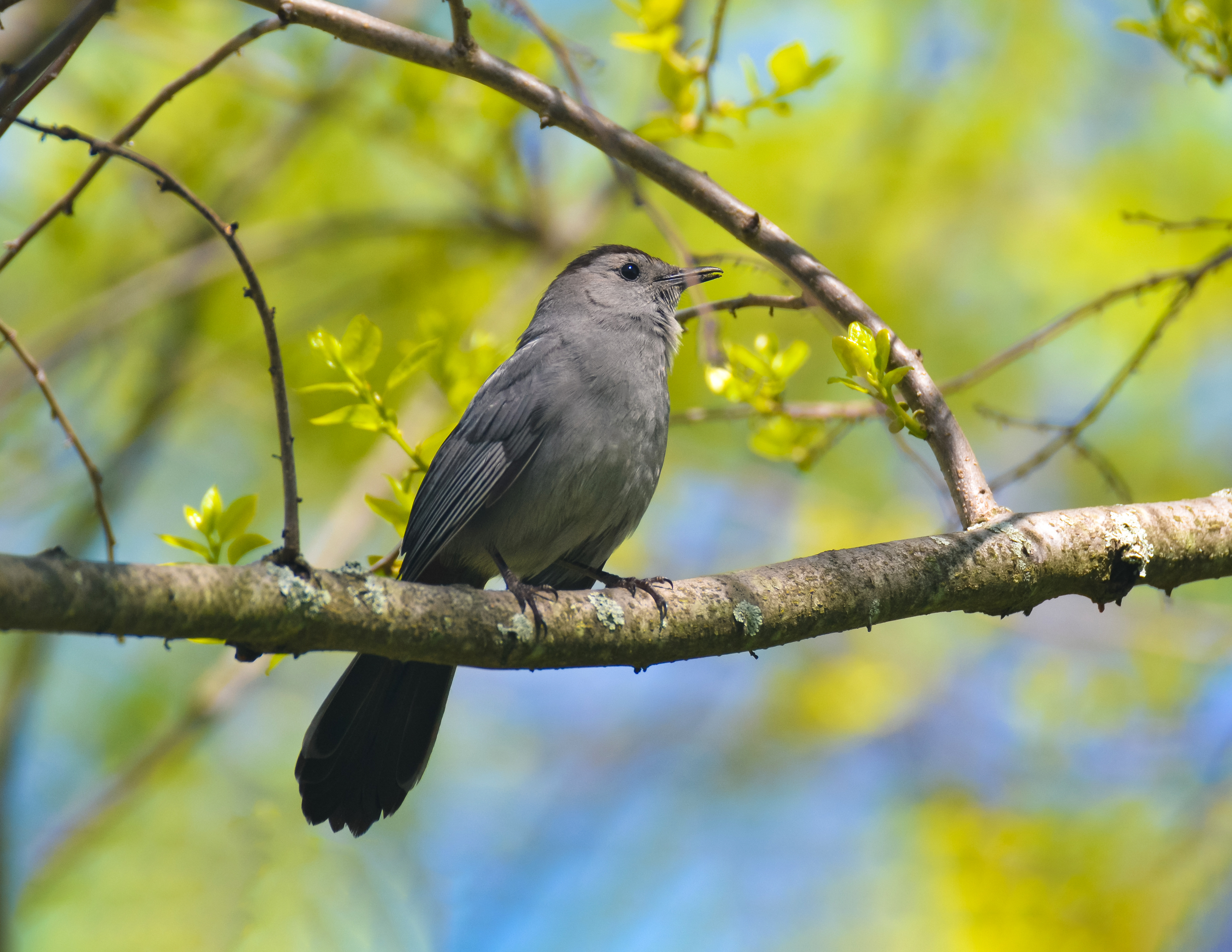
Gray catbird

A gray catbird voicing cat-like sounds at Wildwood Preserve Metropark, Ohio, US

Several unrelated groups of songbirds are called catbirds because of their wailing calls, which resemble a cat's meowing. The genus name Ailuroedus likewise is from the Greek for 'cat-singer' or 'cat-voiced'.

Australasian catbirds are the genera Ailuroedus and the monotypic Scenopooetes. They belong to the bowerbird family (Ptilonorhynchidae) of the basal songbirds:

- Ochre-breasted catbird (Ailuroedus stonii)
- White-eared catbird (Ailuroedus buccoides)
- Tan-capped catbird (Ailuroedus geislerorum)
- Green catbird (Ailuroedus crassirostris)
- Spotted catbird (Ailuroedus maculosus)
- Black-eared catbird (Ailuroedus melanotis)

New World catbirds are two monotypic genera from the mimid family (Mimidae) of the passeridan superfamily Muscicapoidea. Among the Mimidae, they represent independent basal lineages probably closer to the Caribbean thrasher and trembler assemblage than to the mockingbirds and Toxostoma thrashers:

- Gray catbird, Dumetella carolinensis
- Black catbird, Melanoptila glabrirostris

The Abyssinian catbird (Sylvia galinieri) is found in Africa. It was previously considered to represent a monotypic genus Parophasma.
