= List of Greek and Latin roots in English/A =

All Latin and Greek roots beginning with A

Lists of Greek and Latin roots in English beginning with other letters:
- A
- B
- C
- D
- E
- F
- G
- H
- I
- J
- K
- L
- M
- N
- O
- P
- Q
- R
- S
- T
- U
- V
- X
- Z

== A ==
Root	Meaning in English	Origin language	Etymology (root origin)	English examples
ab-, a-, abs-, au-	away from, down, off	Latin	ab	abdication, abduction, aberrant, abnormal, abrasion, absent, absorb, abstain, abstemious, abstraction, aversion, avulsion
abac-	slab	Ancient Greek	ἄβαξ, ἄβακος (ábax, ábakos), ἀβακίσκος (abakískos)	abaciscus, abacus, abax
ac-, acm-, acr-	point	Greek	ἀκή (akḗ), ἀκίς, ἀκίδος (akís, akídos), ἀκόνη (akónē), ἄκρος (ákros), ἄκρον (ákron), ἄκρα	Acidanthera, acme, acmeism, acmesthesia, acmic, acne
ac-, ace-	cure	Greek	ἀκεῖσθαι (akeîsthai), ἀκή (akḗ), ἄκος, ἄκεος (ákos, ákeos)	aceology, autacoid, panacea
academ-	Akademos	Greek	Ἀκάδημος (Akádēmos)	academe, academia, academic, academy
acanth-	thorn	Greek	ἀκή, ἄκανθα (ákantha)	Acanthaster, Acanthion, acanthite, Acanthocephala, acanthocephaliasis, acanthocyte, Acanthomintha, Acanthosaura, Acanthus, Metriacanthosaurus, neuroacanthocytosis
acar-	mite	Greek	ἀκαρί (akarí)	acariasis, acarid, acariphagous, acaroid, acarology, acarophobia, Acarus
accipitr-	hawk	Latin	accipiter	Accipiter, accipitrine
acer-, acri-	bitter, sharp, sour	Latin	ācer, ācris, acerbus, acere	acerbic, acrid, acrimonious, acrimony, exacerbate
acet-	sour, vinegar	Latin	acētum	acetabulum, acetate, acetic, acetone, acetum, triacetate
acid-	acidic, sour	Latin	acidus	acidiferous, acidity, acidosis, acidulation, acidulous
acr-	height, summit, tip, top	Greek	ἀκή (akḗ), ἄκρος (ákros) "high", "extreme", ἄκρον (ákron)	acrobat, acrobatics, acrochordon, acromegalia, acromegaly, acromion, acronym, acrophobia, acropolis, acrostic, acroterion, acrotomophilia
actin-	beam, ray	Greek	ἀκτίς, ἀκτῖνος (aktís, aktînos)	actinic, actinism, actinium, actinocerid, actinodrome, actinoid, actinomere, actinometer, actinomorphic, Actinomyces, actinophryid, actinopod, Actinopterygii, actinotherapy, Actinozoa
acu-, acut-	sharp, pointed	Latin	acutus, past participle of acuere "to sharpen", from acus "needle"	acerose, acupuncture, acumen, acute, acutifoliate
ad-, a-, ac-, af-, ag-, al-, am-, an-, ap-, ar-, as-, at-	movement to or toward; in addition to	Latin	ad "to", "toward"	accept, accurate, adapt, addition, address, adept, adherent, adhesive, adjust, admit, admonish, advertisement, affect, agglomerate, aggregate, aggression, allege, allude, ammunition, annectent, approximate, arreption, arride, arrogant, ascend, assault, assimilate, attend, attract
aden-	gland	Greek	ἀδήν, ἀδένος (adḗn, adénos)	adenocarcinoma, adenoid, adenoidectomy, adenology, adenoma, adenomyosis, adenosis
adip-	fat	Latin	adeps, adipis "fat"	adipocellular, adipose
aer- (ΑΕΡ)	lift, raise	Greek	ἀείρειν (aeírein), ἀορτή (aortḗ), αἰρόμενον, ἀϝείρω	aorta, aortic, endaortitis, meteor, meteorology
aer-, aero-	air, atmosphere	Greek	ἀήρ, ἀέρος (aḗr, aéros) "air"	aerobic, aerodynamic, aeronautics, aeroplane, aerorrhachia, aerosol, aerotitis
aesth-	feeling, sensation	Greek	αἰσθητός (aisthētós), αἰσθητικός (aisthētikós) "of sense perception" from αἰσθάνεσθαι (aisthánesthai) "to perceive"	aesthesia, aesthesis, aesthete, aesthetics, anaesthetic, synesthesia
aether-, ether-	upper pure, bright air	Greek	αἴθειν (aíthein), αἰθήρ (aithḗr)	ether, ethereal, etheric, hypaethros
aev-, ev-	age	Latin	aevum	age, coeval, eon, eternal, longevity, medieval, primeval
ag-, -ig-, act-	do, go, move	Latin	agere, actus	act, action, activation, activity, actor, agenda, agent, agile, agitate, ambiguous, castigate, cogent, cogitate, cogitation, deactivate, excogitate, mitigate, navigate, proactive, react, transaction
ag-	lead	Greek	ἄγειν (ágein) (cognate with Latin agere), ἀγωγός (agōgós)	agony, antagonist, antagonize, demagogue, pedagogue, pedagogy, strategy, synagogue
agap-	love	Greek	ἀγάπη (agápē)	agape
agr-	field	Greek	ἀγρός, ἀγροῦ (agrós, agroû)	agronomist, agronomy
agri-, -egri-	field	Latin	ager, agris "field, country"	agriculture, peregrine
ailur-	cat	Greek	αἴλουρος (aílouros)	Ailuroedus, ailuromancy, ailurophile, ailurophilia, ailurophobia
alac-	cheerful	Latin	alacer	alacrity, allegro
alb-	dull white	Latin	albus	albedo, albino, albumen
alcyon-	kingfisher	Greek	ἀλκυών, ἀλκυόνος (alkuṓn, alkuónos)	Halcyon, halcyon
ale- (ΑΛ)	wheat flour	Greek	ἀλέω, ἄλευρον (áleuron), ἀλείατα	aleuromancy, aleurone, aleuronic
alg-	pain	Greek	ἄλγος (álgos), ἀλγεινός, ἀλγεῖν (algeîn), ἄλγησις (álgēsis)	analgesic, arthralgia, neuralgia, nostalgia
ali-, alter-	other	Latin	alius "another", alter "other"	alias, alibi, alien, alter, alternate, altruism
all-	other	Greek	ἄλλος (állos)	allegory, allogenic, allograph, allophone, parallactic, parallax
allel-	one another	Greek	ἀλλήλων (allḗlōn)	allele, allelomorph, allelotaxis, parallel, parallelism, parallelogon, parallelogram
alph-	A, a	Greek	Α, α, ἄλφα (álpha)	alphabet, alphabetic, analphabetic, panalphabetic, polyalphabetic
alphit-	barley	Greek	ἀλφός (alphós), ἄλφιτον, ἀλφίτου (álphiton, alphítou)	alphitomancy
alt-	high, deep	Latin	altus, altitudo	altimeter, altitude, alto, altocumulus, contralto, exalt
am-, amat-	love, liking	Latin	amāre, amatus, amor	amateur, amatory, amenity, amorous, enamoured
am-, amic-, -imic-	friend	Latin	amicus	amiable, amicable, amity, enemy, enmity, inimical
amath-	sand	Greek	ἄμαθος (amathos)	amathophobia
ambi-, am-, amb-, ambo-, an-	both, on both sides	Latin	ambi	ambidexterity, ambient, ambiguous, ambit, ambition, ambivalent, amboceptor, amputation, ancipital, andante
ambly-	blunt, not sharp, dull	Greek	ἀμβλύς (amblús)	amblygeustia, amblygonite, amblyopia, Amblypoda
ambul-	walk	Latin	ambulare	ambulance, ambulatory, amble, perambulate, preamble, somnambulist
amm-	sand	Greek	ἄμμος (ámmos), ἄμαθος (ámathos)	amathophobia, Ammophila (a plant genus and a wasp genus)
amn-	lamb	Greek	ἀμνός (amnós), ἀμνεῖος, ἀμνειός, ἀμνίον (amníon)	amniocentesis, amnion, amnioscope, amniote, amniotic, anamniote
amph-, amphi-	both, on both sides of, both kinds	Greek	ἀμφί (amphí) "on both sides"	amphibian, amphibious, amphibole, amphibolic, amphimacer, Amphipoda, amphistyly, amphitheatre, amphoterism
ampl-	ample, abundant, bountiful, large	Latin	amplus	ample, amplify, amplitude
amygdal-	almond	Greek	ἀμυγδάλη (amugdálē), ἀμύγδαλον (amúgdalon)	almond, amygdala, amygdale, amygdalin, amygdaloid, amygdule
an-, a-, am-, ar-	not, without	Greek	Greek ἀν-/ἀ- "not"	ambrosia, anaerobic, anarchy, anemia, anesthesia, anhydrous, anonymous, apathy, aphasia, arrhythmia, atheism, atypical
ana-, am-, an-	again, against, back, up	Greek	ἀνά (aná)	anagram, anabaptist, anaphylaxis, anarrhexis, anion, anode
andr- (ΑΝΕΡ)	male, masculine	Greek	ἀνήρ, ἀνδρός (anḗr, andrós), ἀνδρότης	Andrew, Alexander, androcentric, androcentrism, androgen, androgenous, androgyne, androgynous, androgyny, android, andrology, androphobia, androspore, diandry, misandry, monandry, philander, polyandrous, polyandry, protandry, pseudandry, synandrous
anem- (ΑΝ)	wind	Greek	ἄνεμος (ánemos)	anemograph, anemometer, anemometric, anemone, anemophilous, anemophily, anemophobia, anemoscope, anemotropism
anim-	breath, life, soul, spirit	Latin	anima "breath", "soul"	animal, animation, anime, animism, animus, inanimate, equanimity
ann-, -enn-	year, yearly	Latin	annus "year"	anniversary, annual, centennial, millennium, perennial
ant-, anti-	against, opposed to, preventive	Greek	ἀντί (antí) "against"	antagonist, antagonize, antibiotic, antibody, antichrist, antidepressant antidote, antifreeze, antifungal, antigen, antinomies, antipathy, antipodes, antirrhinum, antiseptic, antisocial, antithesis
ante-, anti-	before, in front of, prior to; old	Latin	ante "before", "against"; see also antiquus "old"	antebellum, antecedent, antedate, antediluvian, anteroom, anticipate, antiquarian, antiquate, antique, antiquity
anth-	flower	Greek	ἀνθεῖν (antheîn), ἄνθος (ánthos), ἄνθησις (ánthēsis), ἄνθημα (ánthēma), ἀνθηρός (anthērós)	anther, anthesis, Anthocoridae, anthodite, anthology, anthophobia, anthophore, Anthozoa, chrysanthemum, dianthus, enanthem, enanthema, exanthem, exanthematic, hydranth, hypanthium, perianth, zoanthid
anthrac-	coal	Greek	ἄνθραξ, ἄνθρακος (ánthrax, ánthrakos)	anthracite, anthracnose, anthracycline, anthrax
anthrop-	human	Greek	ἄνθρωπος (ánthrōpos) "man"	anthropology, anthroposophy, anthropomorphic, misanthrope, philanthropy
ap-, apo-	off, away from, separate, at the farthest point	Greek	ἀπό (apó) "from, away, un-, quite", sometimes "changed, switched"	aphelion, apocrine, apocryphal, apogee, aporrhinosis, apostasy, apostate
aper-	open	Latin	aperire	aperient, apéritif, aperitive, aperture, overt, overture, pert
aphrod-	Aphrodite	Greek	Ἀφροδίτη (Aphrodítē), Ἀφροδίσιος (Aphrodísios), ἀφροδισιακόν (aphrodisiakón)	aphrodisiac, pseudohermaphroditism
api-	bee	Latin	apis	apian, apiary, apicula, apium; Petrus Apianus
aqu-	water	Latin	aqua	acquacotta, akvavit, aqua vitae, aquaculture, aquamarine, aquarelle, aquarium, Aquarius, aquatic, aquatile, aqueduct, aqueous, aquifer, aquiferous, aquiform, gouache, semiaquatic
ara-	plow, till	Latin	ărāre	arability, arable, aration, aratory, exarate, exaration, inarable, nonarable
arachn-	spider	Greek	ἀράχνης, ἀράχνη (arákhnē)	Arachne, arachnid, arachnodactyly, arachnoid, arachnology, arachnophobia
arbit-	judge	Latin	arbiter (from ad "to" + baetere "to come, go")	arbiter, arbitrage, arbitrary, arbitration
arcan-	box	Latin	arcanus	arcane, arcanum
arch-, arche-, archi-	ruler	Greek	ἄρχειν (árkhein), ἄρχων (árkhōn), ἀρχή (arkhḗ) "rule" (in compounds: ἀρχε-, ἀρχι-)	anarchism, anarchist, anarchy, andrarchy, antarchy, archangel, archetype, architect, archon, autarch, autarchism, autarchy, eparch, eparchy, exarch, gynarchy, monarch, monarchism, monarchist, monarchy, navarch, octarchy, oligarchy, patriarchy, plutarchy, polyarchy, synarchism, synarchy, tetrarchy, triarchy, trierarch
archae-, arche-	ancient	Greek	ἀρχαῖος (arkhaîos) "ancient" from ἀρχή (arkhḗ) "rule"	Archaea, archaeoastronomy, archaeology, archaic, archaism, archegonium, archeology
arct-	Relating to the North Pole or the region near it; relating to cold	Greek	ἄρκτος (árktos) "bear", ἀρκτικός (arktikós)	Antarctic, arctic, Arctic Ocean, palearctic
ard-	heat, glow, passion	Latin	ardere "to burn", arsus	ardent, ardor, arson
ardu-	difficult	Latin	arduus "high, steep"	arduous
aret-	virtue	Greek	ἀρετή, ἀρετῆς (aretḗ, aretês)	aretaic, arete
argent-	silver	Latin	argentum	argent, Argentina
arid-	be dry	Latin	ārēre "be dry or parched"	arid
arist-	excellence	Greek	ἄριστος (áristos)	aristocracy, aristocrat
arithm-	count, number	Greek	ἀριθμός (arithmós), ἀριθμέω, ἀριθμητικός (arithmētikós)	antilogarithm, arithmetic, arithmomania, logarithm, logarithmic
arm-	weapon	Latin	arma	armament, armistice, armor, armory, arms, army, disarm, rearm
arsen-	male	Greek	ἄρσην, ἄρσενος (ársēn, ársenos), ἀρσενικός (arsenikós)	arsenic, arsenopyrite
art-	art, skill	Latin	ars, artis	artifact, artifice, artificial, artificiality, artisan
arthr-	joint	Greek	ἄρθρον (árthron)	Anarthria, arthritic, arthritis, arthrogryposis, arthropathy, arthroplasty, arthropod, arthroscope, arthroscopic, arthroscopy, arthrosis, dysarthria, osteoarthritis, spondyloarthropathy
arti-	even	Greek	ἄρτιος (ártios), ἀρτιότης "evenness", ἀρτιάκις	artiodactyl, artiodactylous
asc-	bag	Greek	ἀσκός (askós), ἀσκίδιον (askídion)	ascidium, ascites, ascitic, ascocarp, ascoma, ascomycete, Ascomycota, ascospore, ascus
asin-	donkey, ass	Latin	asinus	asinine, ass, easel
asper-	rough	Latin	asper "rough"	asperity, exasperate
aspr-	white	Greek	ἄσπρος (áspros)	diaper
aster-, astr-	star, star-shaped	Greek	ἀστήρ, ἀστέρος (astḗr, astéros), ἄστρον (ástron) "star"	aster, asterisk, asteroid, astrology, astronomy, astronaut, diasterism geaster, monaster
asthen-	weak	Greek	ἀσθενής (asthenḗs)	asthenopia, asthenosphere, asthenozoospermia
ather-	gruel	Greek	ἀθάρη (athárē)	atherogenic, atheroma, atherosclerosis
athl-	contest	Greek	ἆθλος (âthlos) "contest, feat", ἄεθλος	athlete, athletic, decathlon, pentathlon, triathlon
-athroid-	gathered or lumped together	Greek	ἀθροίζειν (athroízein) "to gather together"	epiathroid, hypoathroid
audac-	daring	Latin	audax "brave, bold, daring", from audere "to dare"	audacious, audacity
aud-	hearing, listening, sound	Latin	audire "to hear"	audible, audience, audio, audiobook, audiology, audiovisual, audit, audition, auditorium, auditory
aug-, auct-	grow, increase	Latin	augēre, auctus "to increase"	auction, augend, augment, augmentation, augur, augury, august, author, auxiliary, inauguration
aul-	flute, tube	Greek	ἄημι (ἄϝημι), αὐλός (aulós), αὐλέω, αὔλησις, αὐλητής (aulētḗs)	aulete, aulos, hydraulic, hydraulus
aur-	relating to gold, or gold-colored	Latin	aurum "gold"	aureate, aureole
auri-, aus-	relating to the ear	Latin	auris "ear"	aural, auricle, aurinasal, auscultate, auscultation
aut-, auto-	self; directed from within	Greek	αὐτός (autós) "self", "same"	autarchism, autarchy, autarky, authentic, autism, autistic, autobiography, autocracy, autograph, autoimmune, automatic, automaton, automobile, autonomy, autopilot
aux-	increase	Greek	αὔξειν (aúxein), αὐξάνειν auxánein, αὔξησις (aúxēsis), αὐξητικός (auxētikós)	auxanogram, auxanography, auxanology, auxanometer, auxesis, auxetic, auxin, auxochrome, auxology, auxotroph, auxotrophy
av-	desire	Latin	avere "crave, long for"	avarice, avaricious, avarous, ave, avid, avidity
avi-, au-	bird	Latin	avis	auspice, auspicious, avian, aviary, aviation, aviator
axi-	merit, worth	Greek	ἄξιος (áxios) "worth"	axiology, axiom, axiomatic
axi-	axis	Latin	axis	axion, axis, axisymmetry
axon-	axis, axle	Greek	ἄξων, ἄξονος (áxōn, áxonos)	axon, axonography, axonometric, axonotmesis
