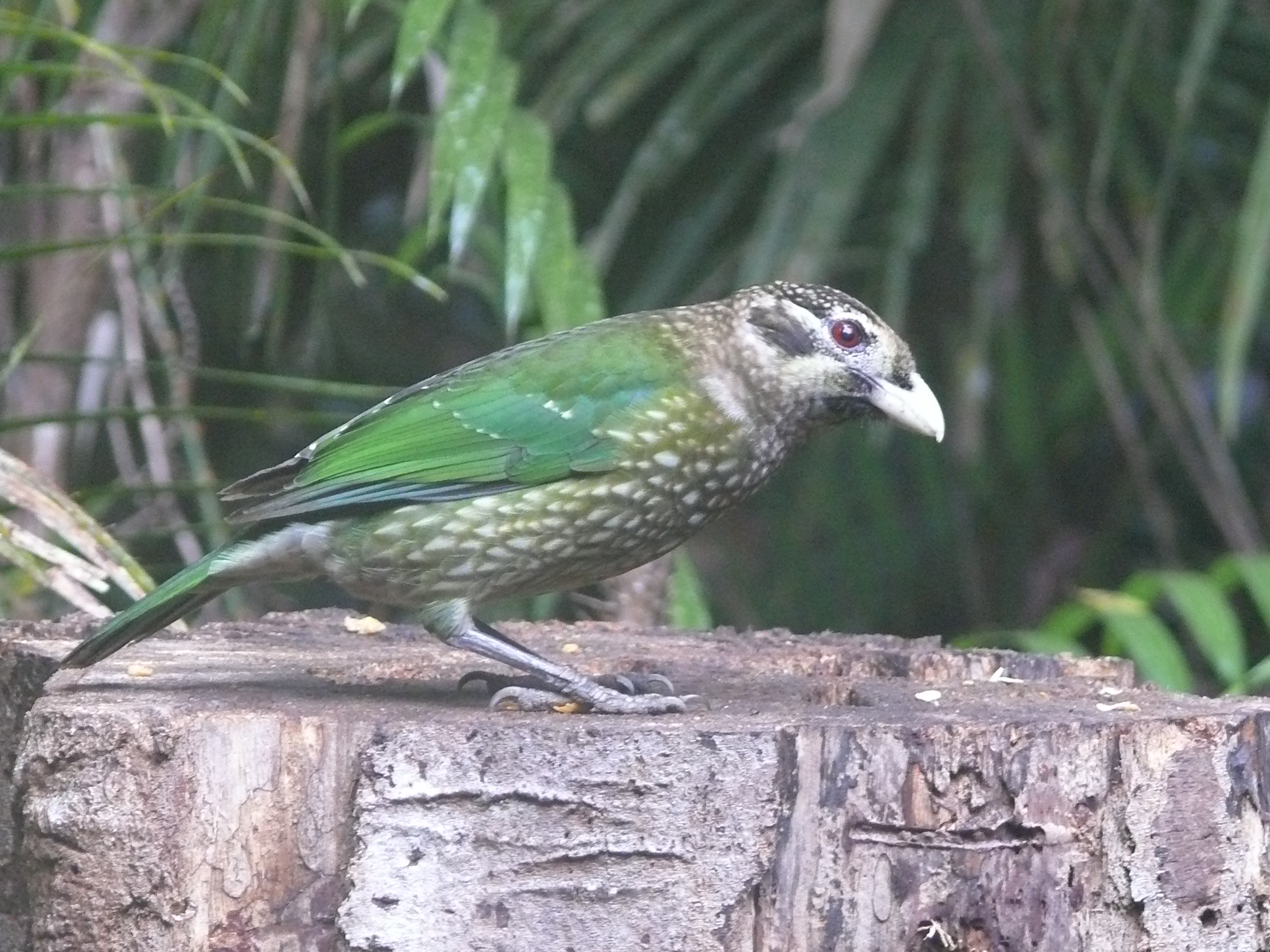

Conservation status
- Least Concern (IUCN 3.1)

Scientific classification
- Kingdom: Animalia
- Phylum: Chordata
- Class: Aves
- Order: Passeriformes
- Family: Ptilonorhynchidae
- Genus: Ailuroedus
- Species: A. melanotis

Binomial name
- Ailuroedus melanotis (GR Gray, 1858)

Subspecies
- See text

= Black-eared catbird =

Species of bird

The black-eared catbird (Ailuroedus melanotis) is a species of bowerbird (Ptilonorhynchidae) which can be found northern Queensland, Australia, and New Guinea, including its surrounding islands. They are named after their cat-like wails and black ear spot.

== Taxonomy ==
The black-eared catbird was formally described in 1858 as Ptilonorhynchus melanotis by the English zoologist George Gray based on a specimen collected by Alfred Russel Wallace in the Aru Islands. The specific epithet combines the Ancient Greek μελας/melas, μελανος/melanos meaning "black" with -ωτις/-ōtis meaning "-eared". The black-eared catbird is now one of six catbirds placed in the genus Ailuroedus that was introduced in 1851 by the German ornithologist Jean Cabanis. The genus name combines the Ancient Greek αιλουρος/ailouros meaning "cat" with αοιδος/aoidos or ωδος/ōdos meaning "singer".

Until 2016, A. melanotis was given the English common name of spotted catbird, this name has now been reassigned to A. maculosus. Martin Irestedt and colleagues examined the black-eared, spotted- and green catbird species complex genetically and found there were seven distinct lineages: the green catbird (A. crassirostris) of eastern Australia and the spotted catbird (A. maculosus) of eastern Queensland being the earliest offshoots, followed by the Huon catbird (A. astigmaticus) and black-capped catbird (A. melanocephalus) of eastern New Guinea, the Arfak catbird (A. arfakianus) of the Bird's Head (Vogelkop) Peninsula, the northern catbird (A. jobiensis) of central-northern New Guinea, and black-eared catbird (A.melanotis) of southwestern New Guinea, Aru Islands and far North Queensland. However in 2025 AviList reconsidered the Ailuroedus melanotis complex and based on the relatively modest genetic and morphological differences chose to treat the complex as containing three rather than seven species.

== Subspecies ==
Eight subspecies are recognized:

- A. m. melanocephalus Ramsay, EP, 1883 – mountains of southeastern New Guinea (black-capped catbird)
- A. m. astigmaticus Mayr, E, 1931 – northeastern New Guinea (mountains of Huon Peninsula) (Huon catbird)
- A. m. jobiensis Rothschild, LW, 1895 – north-central New Guinea (north slope of Western, Border, and Eastern ranges and coastal ranges from Foja Mountains eastward to Adelbert Mountains) (northern catbird)
- A. m. misoliensis Mayr, E & Meyer de Schauensee, R, 1939 – Misool (Raja Ampat Islands, off western New Guinea)
- A. m. arfakianus Meyer, AB, 1874 – western New Guinea (Arfak Mountains of Bird's Head Peninsula) (Arfak catbird)
- A. m. facialis Mayr, E, 1936 – western New Guinea (Nassau and Jayawijaya mountains)
- A. m. melanotis (Gray, GR, 1858) – southern New Guinea, including Aru Islands (off southwestern New Guinea)
- A. m. joanae Mathews, GM, 1941 – northeastern Australia (northeastern Cape York Peninsula, northern Queensland)
