= Heinrich Georg Bronn =

German geologist and paleontologist

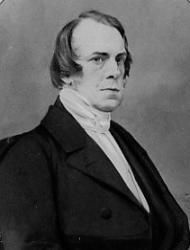
Heinrich Georg Bronn

Heinrich Georg Bronn (3 March 1800 – 5 July 1862) was a German geologist and paleontologist. He was the first to translate Charles Darwin's On the Origin of Species into German in 1860, although not without introducing his own interpretations, as also a chapter critiquing the work.

== Biography ==
Bronn was born at Ziegelhausen (now part of Heidelberg) in the electoral Palatinate. Studying at the university of Heidelberg he took his doctor's degree in the faculty of medicine in 1821, and in the following year was appointed professor of natural history. He now devoted himself to palaeontological studies, and to field-work in various parts of Germany, Italy and France.

From its commencement in 1830 to 1862 he assisted in editing the Jahrbuch für Mineralogie continued as Neues Jahrbuch. His principal work, Lethaea geognostica (2 vols., Stuttgart, 1834–1838; 3rd ed. with F. Romer, 3 vols., 1851–1856), has been regarded as one of the foundations of German stratigraphical geology.

His Handbuch einer Geschichte der Natur, of which the first part was issued in 1841, gave a general account of the physical history of the earth, while the second part dealt with the life-history, species being regarded as direct acts of creation. The third part included his Index Palaeontologicus, and was issued in 3 vols., 1848–1849, with the assistance of Hermann von Meyer and Heinrich Göppert. This record of fossils has proved of inestimable value to all palaeontologists. Bronn's quantitative analysis of the appearance of specific fossils revealed that particular species, such as the ammonites, appeared and disappeared at different times in the fossil record.

An important work on recent and fossil zoology, Die Klassen und Ordnungen des Thier-Reichs, was commenced by Bronn. He wrote the volumes dealing with Amorphozoa, Actinozoa, and Malacozoa, published 1859–1862; the work was continued by other naturalists. Bronn was elected to the American Philosophical Society in 1860. In 1861 Bronn was awarded the Wollaston medal by the Geological Society of London. He died at Heidelberg.

He speculated on evolutionary ideas of adaptation and selective breeding before Charles Darwin in the 1850s but did not fully embrace the transmutation of species. He translated On the Origin of Species by Darwin into the German language. In 1858, Bronn proposed a "tree of life" as a means of depicting the genealogical relationships among organisms. (Note: (Bronn, 1858) The tree of life diagram appears on p. 481, and the explanation of the diagram appears on pp. 481–482. From pp. 481–482, starting from "Anm. Es ergibt sich aus den vorangehenden Untersuchungen, … ": "Note: It emerges from the preceding investigations that not only the invertebrate animals, the fishes, the reptiles, the warm-blooded birds and mammals and finally Man only gradually appeared one after the other – yet also in the individual subkingdoms of the radiata, molluscs, insects, fishes, the higher branches of the system appeared only after the lower [ones] – however in a way that the higher twig of a lower branch often developed later than the lower twig of a higher branch. If one wants to represent this relation by an image, then it will correspond to a tree-shaped image of the system, in which the higher or lower position of the different twigs would be sure to express the absolute level of organization of each individual twig, no matter whether it [i.e., the twig] sits on a higher or lower branch. Thus, the twig a on the lowest branch A developed earlier than branch B, but twig c of the first branch [A developed] only after twig b of the second [branch B] and with twig c of the second [branch] (B) and of third branch (C). The first twig g of the fourth branch D only emerged after the first twig f of the following branch E appeared, and so forth. – In almost all groups and classes of the system, it is a discernable phenomenon that the highest classes of a lower group, the highest orders of a lower class are definitely more perfect than the lowest classes of the next higher group and the lowest orders of the next higher class (we recall the Amphioxus as the lowest fish and the octopus as the highest mollusc, between which nevertheless the whole group of the insects lies): – and so it can often be consistent with the law of progressive development that an animal group M appeared after the animal group P, because it is more perfectly organized, although it belongs to a lower branching of the system than that [one, namely P].")

== Works ==
- System der urweltlichen Konchylien. durch Diagnose, Analyse und Abbildung der Geschlechter erläutert. J.C.B. Mohr, Heidelberg 1824. doi:10.5962/bhl.title.8749
- System der urweltlichen Pflanzenthiere. J.C.B. Mohr, Heidelberg 1825. doi:10.5962/bhl.title.9094
- Italiens Tertiär-Gebilde und deren organische Einschlüsse. Groos, Heidelberg 1831. doi:10.5962/bhl.title.59236
- als Herausgeber mit Karl Cäsar von Leonhard: Neues Jahrbuch für Mineralogie, Geognosie, Geologie und Petrefaktenkunde. E. Schweizerbart's Verlagshandlung, Stuttgart 1833–1862. online
- Die ersten Auflagen der Lethaea geognostica oder Abbildungen und Beschreibungen der für die Gebirgs-Formationen bezeichnendsten Versteinerungen. In mehreren Bänden inkl. Bilderatlas. Stuttgart 1834–1838. https://doi.org/10.5962/bhl.title.59080
- Untersuchungen über die Entwickelungs-Gesetze der organischen Welt während der Bildungs-Zeit unserer Erd-Oberfläche. E. Schweizerbart'sche Verlagshandlung, Stuttgart 1858. doi:10.5962/bhl.title.50675
- Die Klassen und Ordnungen des Thier-Reichs (alternative title Dr. H.G. Bronn's Klassen und Ordnungen des Thier-Reichs: wissenschaftlich dargestellt in Wort und Bild). C.F. Winter, Leipzig und Heidelberg, 1859. Some volumes were not published. doi:10.5962/bhl.title.2054.
  - First editions:
    - Band 1: Amorphozoa, von H.G. Bronn, 1859, .
    - Band 2: Actinozoa, von H.G. Bronn, 1860, .
    - Band 3, Malacozoa, Abt. 1: Malacozoa acephala, von H.G. Bronn, 1862, .
    - Band 3, Malacozoa, Abt. 2: Malacozoa cephalophora, von W. Keferstein, 1862–1866, .
    - Band 5, Arthropoden, Abt. 1, Crustacea, Halfte 1: Entomostraca. Von A. Gerstaecker, 1866–1879, .
    - Band 5, Arthropoden, Abt. 1, Crustacea, Halfte 2: Malacostraca. Von A. Gerstaecker, und A. E. Ortmann. Princeton, 1901, , plates .
  - Band 1, Protozoa, Abt. 1: Sarkodina und Sporozoa, von O. Bütschli, 1880–82, .
  - Band 1, Protozoa, Abt. 2: Mastigophora, von O. Bütschli, 1883–87, , plates .
  - Band 1, Protozoa, Abt. 3: Infusoria und System der Radiolaria, von O. Bütschli, 1887–89, , plates .
  - Band 2, Abt. 1: Spongien (Porifera), von Dr. G.C.J. Vosmaer, 1887, .
  - Band 2, Abt. 2, Coelenterata, Buch 1, Abs. 1: Allgemeine Naturgeschichte der Cölenteraten, bearbeitet von Prof. Dr. Carl Chun, 1889–1892, .
  - Band 2, Abt. 2, Coelenterata, Buch 1, Abs. 2: Specieller Theil, bearbeitet von Prof. Dr. Carl Chun, 1894–1916.
  - Band 2, Abt. 2, Coelenterata, Buch 2: Scyphomedusae, bearbeitet von M. E. Thiel, 1936–1962.
  - Band 2, Abt. 2, Coelenterata, Buch 3: Anthozoa, bearbeitet von Dr. O. Carlgren, 1903 + atlas, .
  - Band 2, Abt. 3, Echinodermen (Stachelhäuter), Buch 1: Die Seewalzen, von Dr. Hubert Ludwig, 1889–1892, .
  - Band 2, Abt. 3, Echinodermen (Stachelhäuter), Buch 2: Die Seesterne, begonnen von Dr. Hubert Ludwig, fortgesetzt von Prof. Dr. Otto Hamann, 1899, .
  - Band 2, Abt. 3, Echinodermen (Stachelhäuter), Buch 3: Die Schlangensterne, begonnen von Dr. Hubert Ludwig, fortgesetzt von Prof. Dr. Otto Hamann, 1901.
  - Band 2, Abt. 3, Echinodermen (Stachelhäuter), Buch 4: Die Seeigel, begonnen von Dr. Hubert Ludwig, fortgesetzt von Prof. Dr. Otto Hamann, 1904, .
  - Band 2, Abt. 3, Echinodermen (Stachelhäuter), Buch 5: Die Seelilien, von Dr. Hubert Ludwig, 1889–1907, .
  - Band 3, Mollusca, Abt. 1: Amphineura und Scaphopoda, von Dr. H. Simroth, 1892–1895, .
  - Band 3, Mollusca, Abt. 2, Buch 1: Gastropoda prosobranchia, von Dr. H. Simroth, 1896–1907 + atlas, .
  - Band 3, Mollusca, Abt. 2, Buch 2: Pulmonata, von Dr. H. Simroth, fortgeführt von Dr. H. Hoffmann, 1896–1907 + atlas.
  - Band 3, Mollusca, Abt. 3: Bivalvia, Teil 1–2, bearbeitet von Dr. F. Haas, 1935–1955.
  - Band 3, Supplement 1, Tunicata (Manteltiere), Abt. 1: Die Appendicularien und Ascidien, begonnen von Dr. Osw. Seeliger, fortgesetzt von Dr. R. Hartmeyer, 1893–1911, , , .
  - Band 3, Supplement 1, Tunicata (Manteltiere), Abt. 2: Pyrosomen, begonnen von Dr. Osw. Seeliger, fortgesetzt von Dr. G. Neumann, 1910–1913, .
  - Band 3, Supplement 2, Tunikaten (Manteltiere), Abt. 2, Buch 2, Lief. 1: Doliolidae, bearbeitet von Prof. Dr. Günther Neumann.
  - Band 3, Supplement 2, Tunikaten (Manteltiere), Abt. 2, Buch 2, Lief. 2–3: Salpidae, bearbeitet von J. E. W. Ihle, 1935–1939.
  - Band 4, Vermes, Abt. 1a: Mionelminthes, Trichoplax und Trematodes, bearbeitet von Prof. Dr. H. Pagenstecher und Prof. Dr. M. Braun, 1879–1893, .
  - Band 4, Vermes, Abt. 1b: Cestodes, fortgesetzt von Prof. Dr. M. Braun, 1894–1900 + atlas, .
  - Band 4, Vermes, Abt. 1c, Turbellaria, Abt. 1: Acoela und Rhabdocoelida, bearbeitet von Dr. L. von Graff, mit Beiträgen von Prof. Dr. L. Böhmig und Prof. Dr. Fr. von Wagner, 1904–1908 + atlas, .
  - Band 4, Vermes, Abt. 1c, Turbellaria, Abt. 2: Tricladida, bearbeitet von Dr. L. von Graff, mit Beiträgen von Prof. Dr. P. Steinmann, Prof. Dr. L. Böhmig und Dr. A. Meixner, 1912–1917 + atlas, .
  - Band 4, Vermes, Abt. 1c, Turbellaria, Abt. 3: Polycladida, bearbeitet von R. Stummer-Traunfels, 1933.
  - Band 4, Vermes, Abt. 2, Aschelminthen, Trochelminthes, Buch 1, Teil 1: Rotatorien, Gastrotrichen und Kinorhynchen, bearbeitet von A. Remane, 1929–1933.
  - Band 4, Vermes, Abt. 2, Aschelminthen, Buch 1, Teil 2: Gastrotricha und Kinorhyncha, bearbeitet von Prof. Dr. A. Remane, 1935–1936.
  - Band 4, Vermes, Abt. 2, Aschelminthen, Buch 3: Nematodes und Nematomorpha, bearbeitet von L. A. Jägerskiöld und J. H. Schuurmans Stekhoven Jr, 1913–1959.
  - Band 4, Vermes, Abt. 2, Aschelminthen, Buch 4: Kamptozoa, bearbeitet von Dr. Carl I. Cori, 1936.
  - Band 4, Vermes, Abt. 3, Annelides, Buch 2: Polychaeta, bearbeitet von F. Hempelmann, 1937.
  - Band 4, Vermes, Abt. 3, Annelides, Buch 3: Oligochaeta, bearbeitet von H. A. Stolte, 1935–1969.
  - Band 4, Vermes, Abt. 3, Annelides, Buch 4: Hirudineen, Teil 1–2, bearbeitet von Dr. K. Herter, Dr. W. Schleip und Dr. H. Autrum, 1936–1939.
  - Band 4, Vermes, Abt. 4, Tentaculaten, Chaetognathen und Hemichordaten, Buch 1, Phoronidea, Ektoprokta und Brachiopoda, Teil 1: Phronidea, bearbeitet von Prof. Dr. Carl I. Cori, 1939.
  - Band 4, Vermes, Abt. 4, Tentaculaten, Chaetognathen und Hemichordaten, Buch 2, Chaetognathen und Hemichordaten, Teil 1: Chaetognatha, bearbeitet von Dr. W. Kuhl, 1938.
  - Band 4, Vermes, Abt. 4, Tentaculaten, Chaetognathen und Hemichordaten, Buch 2, Chaetognathen und Hemichordaten, Teil 2: Hemichordata, bearbeitet von Dr. C. J. van der Horst. 1934–1939.
  - Band 4, Vermes, Supplement: Nemertini (Schnurwürmer), bearbeitet von Dr. O. Bürger, 1897–1907, .
  - Band 5, Arthropoden, Abt. 1, Crustacea, Buch 1: Allgemeines.
  - Band 5, Arthropoden, Abt. 1, Crustacea, Buch 2, Teil 1: Phiillopoda.
  - Band 5, Arthropoden, Abt. 1, Crustacea, Buch 2, Teil 2: Ostracoda.
  - Band 5, Arthropoden, Abt. 1, Crustacea, Buch 3, Teil 3: Cirripedia, bearbeitet von Paul Krüger, 1940
  - Band 5, Arthropoden, Abt. 1, Crustacea, Buch 3, Teil 4: Ascothoracida, bearbeitet von Paul Krüger, 1940
  - Band 5, Arthropoden, Abt. 1, Crustacea, Buch 4: Thermosbaenacea, bearbeitet von Th. Monod, 1940
  - Band 5, Arthropoden, Abt. 1, Crustacea, Buch 4, Teil 2: Syncarida, bearbeitet von R. Siewing, 1959
  - Band 5, Arthropoden, Abt. 1, Crustacea, Buch 5: Isopoda.
  - Band 5, Arthropoden, Abt. 1, Crustacea, Buch 6, Teil 2: Stomatopoda, bearbeitet von Heinrich Balss. 1938
  - Band 5, Arthropoden, Abt. 1, Crustacea, Buch 7: Decapoda, bearbeitet von Heinrich Balss und W. v. Buddenbrock, 1940–1957.
  - Band 5, Arthropoden, Abt. 2, Myriapoda, Buch 1: Klasse Chilopoda, von Dr. K. W. Verhoeff, 1902–1925.
  - Band 5, Arthropoden, Abt. 2, Myriapoda, Buch 2: Klasse Diplopoda, Teil 1–2, bearbeitet von Dr. K. W. Verhoeff, 1926–1932.
  - Band 5, Arthropoden, Abt. 2, Myriapoda, Buch 3, Symphyla und Pauropoda, bearbeitet von Dr. K. W. Verhoeff, 1933–1934.
  - Band 5, Arthropoden, Abt. 3, Insecta, Buch 6: Embioidea und Orthopteroidea, bearbeitet von Dr. Max Beier, 1955–1959.
  - Band 5, Arthropoden, Abt. 3, Insecta, Buch 8, Teil b.ε: Coccina, ; Teil b.γ: Psyllina, , bearbeitet von Dozent Dr. Otto Pflugfelder, 1939–1941.
  - Band 5, Arthropoden, Abt. 3, Insecta, Buch 12, Teil a: Neuroptera, bearbeitet von Prof. Dr. Hermann Friedrich, 1953.
  - Band 5, Arthropoden, Abt. 3, Insecta, Buch 13, Teil f: Aphaniptera, bearbeitet von Prof. Dr. Julius Wagner, 1939, .
  - Band 5, Arthropoden, Abt. 4, Arachnoidea, Buch 1: Pentastomida, bearbeitet von Prof. Dr. R. Heymons, 1935.
  - Band 5, Arthropoden, Abt. 4, Arachnoidea, Buch 2: Pantopoda, bearbeitet von H. Helfer und E. Schlottke, 1935.
  - Band 5, Arthropoden, Abt. 4, Arachnoidea, Buch 3: Tardigrada, bearbeitet von Ernst Marcus, 1929.
  - Band 5, Arthropoden, Abt. 4, Arachnoidea, Buch 4: Solifuga, Palpigrada, bearbeitet von C. Fr. Roewer, 1933–1934, .
  - Band 5, Arthropoden, Abt. 4, Arachnoidea, Buch 6, Teil 1: Chelonethi oder Pseudoskorpione, bearbeitet von Prof. Dr. C. Fr. Roewer, 1940.
  - Band 5, Arthropoden, Abt. 4, Arachnoidea, Buch 8: Scorpiones, Pedipalpi, bearbeitet von Franz Werner, 1934–1935.
  - Band 6, Vertebrata, Abt. 1: Pisces (Fische), Buch 1: Einleitendes, Leptocardii und Cyclostomi, bearbeitet von Dr. E. Lönnberg, G. Favaro, B. Mozejko und M. Rauther, 1924.
  - Band 6, Vertebrata, Abt. 1: Pisces (Fische), Buch 2, Echte Fische, Teil 1: Anatomie, Physiologie und Entwicklungsgeschichte, bearbeitet von Prof. Dr. M. Rauther und M. Leiner, 1927–1940.
  - Band 6, Vertebrata, Abt. 1: Pisces (Fische), Buch 2, Echte Fische, Teil 2: Anatomie, bearbeitet von Z. Grodzinski und H. Hoyer und M.Rauther, 1938–1954.
  - Band 6, Vertebrata, Abt. 1: Pisces (Fische), Buch 2, Echte Fische, Teil 3: Ökologie, Systematik, Geographische Verbreitung und Stammesgeschichte. Bearbeitet von G. Duncker und E. Mohr, Hamburg. Wird 1940 zu erscheinen beginnen.
  - Band 6, Vertebrata, Abt. 2: Wirbelthiere (Amphibien), fortgesetzt von C. K. Hoffmann, 1873–1878, .
  - Band 6, Vertebrata, Abt. 3, Reptilien, Teil 1: Schildkröten, fortgesetzt von C. K. Hoffmann, 1890, .
  - Band 6, Vertebrata, Abt. 3, Reptilien, Teil 2: Eidechsen und Wasserechsen, fortgesetzt von C. K. Hoffmann, 1890, , .
  - Band 6, Vertebrata, Abt. 3, Reptilien, Teil 3: Schlangen und Entwicklungsgeschichte der Reptilien, fortgesetzt von C. K. Hoffmann, 1890, , .
  - Band 6, Vertebrata, Abt. 4, Vögel (Aves), Teil 1: Anatomischer Teil. Von H. Gadow (Cambridge) und E. Selenka (Erlangen), 1891, .
  - Band 6, Vertebrata, Abt. 4, Vögel (Aves), Teil 2: Systematischer Theil, von Hans Gadow, 1893, .
  - Band 6, Vertebrata, Abt. 5, Mammalia, Buch 1 (oder Band 1): Osteologie, Muskulatur, Integument, Verdauungsorgane, Atmungsorgane, Schilddrüse, Thymus, Winterschlaf drüse, bearbeitet von Prof. Dr. C. G. Giebel und Prof. Dr. W. Leche, 1874–1900 + atlas, .
  - Band 6, Vertebrata, Abt. 5, Mammalia, Buch 2, Gefäß- und Urogenitalsystem, Teil 1: Das Gefässystem, bearbeitet von Dr. W. Leche, fortgsetzt von Dr. E. Göppert, 1902–1906.
  - Band 6, Vertebrata, Abt. 5, Mammalia, Buch 2, Gefäß- und Urogenitalsystem, Teil 2: Das Herz. Bearbeitet E. Ackernecht, Leipzig.
  - Band 6, Vertebrata, Abt. 5, Mammalia, Buch 2, Gefäß- und Urogenitalsystem, Teil 3: Die Arterien.
  - Band 6, Vertebrata, Abt. 5, Mammalia, Buch 2, Gefäß- und Urogenitalsystem, Teil 4: Die Venen. Bearbeitet H. Grau, Keredj.
  - Band 6, Vertebrata, Abt. 5, Mammalia, Buch 2, Gefäß- und Urogenitalsystem, Teil 5, Lieferung 1–4: Urogenitalsystem, herausgegeben von Dr. E. Göppert. Erste Unterabteilung, bearbeitet von Dr. U. Gerhardt, 1914, . Lieferung 5: begonnen von Prof. Dr. U. Gerhardt, fortgsetzt von Prof. Dr. Ludwig Freund, 1939, .
  - Band 6, Vertebrata, Abt. 5, Mammalia, Buch 2, Gefäß- und Urogenitalsystem, Teil 6: Das Lymphgefäßsystem. Bearbeitet H. Grau, Keredj.
  - Band 6, Vertebrata, Abt. 5, Mammalia, Buch 3, Nervensystem und Sinnesorgane, Teil 1: Das Zentralnervensystem, bearbeitet von Dr. phil. et med. Ernst Scharrer, 1936.
  - Band 6, Vertebrata, Abt. 5, Mammalia, Buch 3, Nervensystem und Sinnesorgane, Teil 2: Peripheres und autonomes Nervensystem. Bearbeitet H. Chreiber, Frankfurt. Wird 1940 zu erscheinen beginnen.
  - Band 6, Vertebrata, Abt. 5, Mammalia, Buch 3, Nervensystem und Sinnesorgane, Teil 3: Sinnesorgane. Bearbeitet H. Kahmann. München. Wird 1940 zu erscheinen beginnen.
- mit Georg Hartung: Die Azoren in ihrer äusseren Erscheinung und nach ihrer geognostischen Natur. W. Engelmann, Leipzig 1860. doi:10.5962/bhl.title.60459
- Charles Darwin, über die Entstehung der Arten im Thier- und Pflanzen-Reich durch natürliche Züchtung, oder Erhaltung der vervollkommneten Rassen im Kampfe um's Daseyn. E. Schweizerbart'sche Verlagshandlung und Druckerei, Stuttgart 1860. doi:10.5962/bhl.title.50672
- Über die Einrichtungen zur Befruchtung Britischer und ausländischer Orchideen durch Insekten. Schweizerbart'sche Verlagshandlung, Stuttgart 1862 doi:10.5962/bhl.title.15549
