= Dystenoid =

A dystenoid nervous system is an arrangement of ganglia in the anterior region of some molluscs where the cerebral and pleural ganglia are situated closer to each other than they are in those molluscs with the more archaic hypoathroid nervous system, but still further apart than those animals with an evolutionarily more recent epiathroid nervous system.

Examples of animals having dystenoid systems include Macleaniella moskalevi, Teuthirustria cancellata, and Fedikofella caymanensis (weakly dystenoid in all three). These are deep sea limpets belonging to the superfamily Cocculinoidea.
