= Crithomancy =

Form of divination

Crithomancy (also known as critomancy) is a form of divination by the study of barley cakes in hope of drawing omens from them. The paste of cakes which are offered in sacrifice is closely examined, and the sought-for answers are drawn from the flour which is spread upon them.

It was in use among the aborigines that lived in the Americas. The native tribes in what is now Arizona would have used a mixture of powdered grains as ritual sacrifice every morning and carried it around with them as well.

The term crithomancy (from Greek κριθή krithḗ) is also used for divination by cereal grains. The ancient Greek priests would have thought of as divining through the use of corn grains. The soothsayer would scatter the grains on either freshly sacrificed or soon to be sacrificed animals and read them for omens.

There were also incidents of this form of divination identified in ancient Egypt and Peru where medicine men would take signs from the shapes of randomly drawn grains of corn.

== See also ==
- Alphitomancy
