= Corsned =

Type of trial by ordeal in Anglo-Saxon law

In Anglo-Saxon law, corsned (OE cor, "trial, investigation", + snǽd, "bit, piece". Latin panis conjuratus), also known as the accursed or sacred morsel, or the morsel of execration, was a type of trial by ordeal that consisted of a suspected person eating a piece of barley bread and cheese totaling about one ounce in weight and consecrated with a form of exorcism as a trial to determine innocence. If guilty, it was believed that the bread would produce convulsions and paleness and cause choking. If innocent, it was believed the person could swallow it freely, and the bread would turn to nourishment. The term dates to before 1000 AD; the laws of Ethelred II reference this practice: "Gif man freondleasne weofod-þen mid tihtlan belecge, ga to corsnæde."(transl. If anyone accuses a friendless priest of a crime, let him go to the Corsned) The ecclesiastical laws of Canute the Great also mention the practice. According to Isaac D'Israeli, the bread was of unleavened barley, and the cheese was made of ewe's milk in the month of May. Writers such as Richard Burn and John Lingard have considered it an imitation of the "water of jealousy" used in the ordeal prescribed in Numbers 5:11–31 for cases of jealousy.

== Details ==
In this ordeal, the priest wrote the Lord's Prayer on the bread, of which he then weighed out ten pennyweights, and so likewise with the cheese. Under the right foot of the accused, he set a cross of poplar wood, and, holding another cross of the same material over the man's head, threw over his head the theft written on a tablet. He placed the bread and cheese in the mouth of the accused at the same moment and, on doing so, recited the conjuration:

I conjure thee, O man, by the Father and the Son and the Holy Ghost and by the four-and-twenty elders, who daily sound praises before God, and by the twelve patriarchs, the twelve prophets, the twelve apostles, the evangelists, martyrs, confessors, and virgins, by all the saints and by our Redeemer, our Lord Jesus Christ, who for our salvation and for our sins did suffer His hands to be affixed to the cross; that if thou wast a partner in this theft or didst know of it, or hadst any fault, that bread and cheese may not pass thy gullet and throat, but that thou mayest tremble like an aspen-leaf, Amen; and not have rest, O man, until thou dost vomit it forth with blood, if thou hast committed aught in the matter of the aforesaid theft. Through Him who liveth.

—

The following prayer and exorcism were also used and ordered to be repeated three times:

Holy Father, omnipotent, eternal God, maker of all things visible, and of all things spiritual, who dost look into secret places, and dost know all things, who dost search the hearts of men, and dost rule as God, I pray Thee, hear the words of my prayer; that whoever has committed or carried out or consented to that theft, that bread and cheese may not be able to pass through his throat.

I exorcize thee, most unclean dragon, ancient serpent, dark night, by the word of truth, and the sign of light, by our Lord Jesus Christ, the immaculate Lamb generated by the Most High, conceived of the Holy Ghost, born of the Virgin Mary—Whose coming Gabriel the archangel did announce; Whom seeing, John did call out: This is the living and true Son of God—that in no wise mayest thou permit that man to eat this bread and cheese, who has committed this theft or consented to it or advised it. Adjured by Him who is to come to judge the quick and the dead, so thou close his throat with a band—not, however, unto death.

—

Legal historian Richard Burn believed that corsned bread may have originally been the very sacramental bread, but that later, the bishops and clergy would no longer allow the communion bread for such superstitious purposes; they would, however, allow the people to use the same judicial rite, in eating some other morsels of bread, blessed or cursed for the same uses.

It has been asserted that this ordeal was specifically preserved for the clergy. On the other hand, Godwin, Earl of Wessex, is said to have died in this manner in 1053 while denying that he had any role in the death of King Edward the Confessor's brother Alfred in 1036; however, the primary contemporary source for this information is the Croyland Chronicle, attributed to Ingulph (d. 1109), which has since been shown to be a much later forgery. The practice has long since been gradually abolished. Du Cange observed that the expression, "May this piece of bread choke me!" comes from this custom. Other common phrases of the same origin include "I will take the sacrament upon it!" and "May this morsel be my last!".

== See also ==
- Alphitomancy
- Witches of Belvoir – One of the women in this case reportedly died after wishing she should choke on her food if she was guilty.
