= Alphito =

Alphito (Ancient Greek: Ἀλφιτώ) is a supernatural being first recorded in the Moralia of Plutarch, where "apotropaic nursery tales" about her are told by nursemaids to frighten little children into behaving. Her name is related to alphita, "white flour" (compare Latin albus), and alphitomanteia, a form of divination (-manteia) from flour or barley meal. She was presumably old, with white hair the color of flour.

Although Alphito has been called a mere boogeyman, the 19th-century folklorist Wilhelm Mannhardt, forerunner of J.G. Frazer, classified her as originally a "corn mother" because of her name, and others have considered her a vegetation spirit. According to Robert Graves, Frazer thought Alphito was actually Demeter or Persephone.

Although evidence for Alphito rests in the minimal reference in Plutarch and an indirectly relevant entry in the lexicographer Hesychius, Graves developed an elaborate thesis that Alphito was "'the White Goddess', who in Classical times had degenerated into a nursery bugbear but who seems originally to have been the Danaan Barley-goddess of Argos." In The White Goddess: A Historical Grammar of Poetic Myth, Graves describes the whiteness of the goddess as a dichotomy:

In one sense it is the pleasant whiteness of pearl-barley, or a woman's body, or milk, or unsmutched snow; in another it is the horrifying whiteness of a corpse, or a spectre, or leprosy. … Alphito, it has been shown, combined these senses: for alphos is white leprosy, the vitiliginous sort which attacks the face, and alphiton is barley, and Alphito lived on the cliff tops of Nonacris in perpetual snow."

No ancient source connects Alphito to leprosy nor the Arcadian site of Nonacris.

In recent scholarship, Alphito is classed with spirits or demons that threaten reproduction and child-nurturing such as Acco, Gello, and Mormo.
