= Georg Hartung =

German geologist (1821–1891)

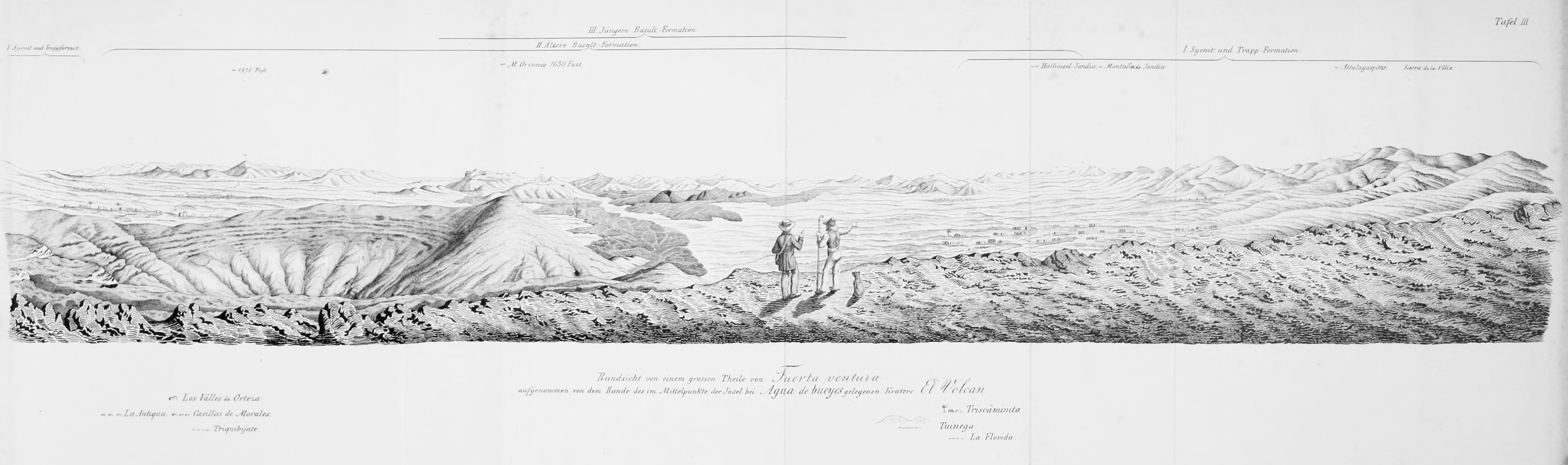
Hartung and his guide in Fuerta Ventura as depicted by him, 1857

Georg Friedrich Karl Hartung (13 July 1821 – 28 March 1891) was a pioneering German traveller and geologist. He is best known for several books and articles about the islands of Macaronesia, especially the Azores, Madeira and the Canary Islands.

== Life and work ==
Hartung was born in Königsberg where his father, Georg Friedrich Hartung (1782–1849), owned a press and published the Hartungsche Zeitung. His mother was Anna Maria Sophie Greis (1797–1870). The family was prosperous and his father served as a municipal councillor for Königsberg. He went to the Classical Grammar school in Insterburg and at the age of 16 he first worked with his father, contributing his sketches for publications. studied agronomy at the University of Greifswald (1841-43) and after missing the academic year for the University of Heidelberg, he studied geology privately from 1855 under Gustav von Leonhard (1816–1878). His father gave the house to Georg and the printing firm was sold off in 1871 and the family assets funded Hartung's life. He travelled widely into the tropics partly for health reasons. In Madeira he lived in Funchal where he shared a house with the paleobotanist Oswald Heer (who had been advised the warm climate by Leopold von Buch) and joined him on outings. He also met Charles Lyell in 1853-54 and accompanied him. He became interested in the theories of von Buch on mountain uplift and Lyell's ideas on them. Hartung later travelled to Lanzarote and Fuertaventura on his own. He sketched the scenery and made notes on his geological observations. He wrote to others interested in geology and Alexander von Humboldt encouraged him to study the Azores. In 1857 he visited the Azores and wrote on the geology of Terceira Island. In 1858 he began to examine volcanic regions in Europe. He published his notes on Lanzarote, Fuertaventura, Madeira and Porto Santo Island. He received an honorary doctorate from the University of Königsberg in 1862 for his work on the geology of the Atlantic islands. In 1870 he travelled to the United States where he met Louis Agassiz. In 1873 he visited Scandinavia and began to study glaciation. The work of Hartung on the Azores contains illustrations of scientific interest. Hartung also met and corresponded with Charles Darwin. From 1855 Hartung had a home in Heidelberg.

Selected works

- Hartung. Mitbeschreibung der fossilen reste, von Prof. H. G. Bronn ..., Wilhelm Engelmann, Leipzig, 1860.
- Fritsch, Karl Wilhelm Georg von Hartung, Georg Reiss, Johann Wilhelm. Tenerife geologisch-topographisch dargestellt, ein Beitrag zur Kenntniss vulkanischer Gebirge von K. v. Fritsch, G. Hartung und W. Reiss, J. Wurster, 16 pp., 1867.
- Die Azoren in ihrer äusseren erscheinung und nach ihrer geognostischen natur. 1860.
- Hartung, Georg. Die geologischen Verhältnisse der Inseln Lanzarote und Fuertaventura, Zürich, 166 pp., 1857.
- Hartung, Georg. Betrachtungen über Erhebungskrater, ältere und neuere Eruptivmassen, nebst einer Schilderung der geologischen Verhältnisse der Insel Gran Canaria. Wilhelm Engelmann, Leipzig, 108 pp., 1862.
- Hartung, Georg. Originalzeichnungen und Probedrucke zu Illustrationen der geologischen Beschreibungen der Azoren und Kanarischen Inseln. 1850 [ca.]
