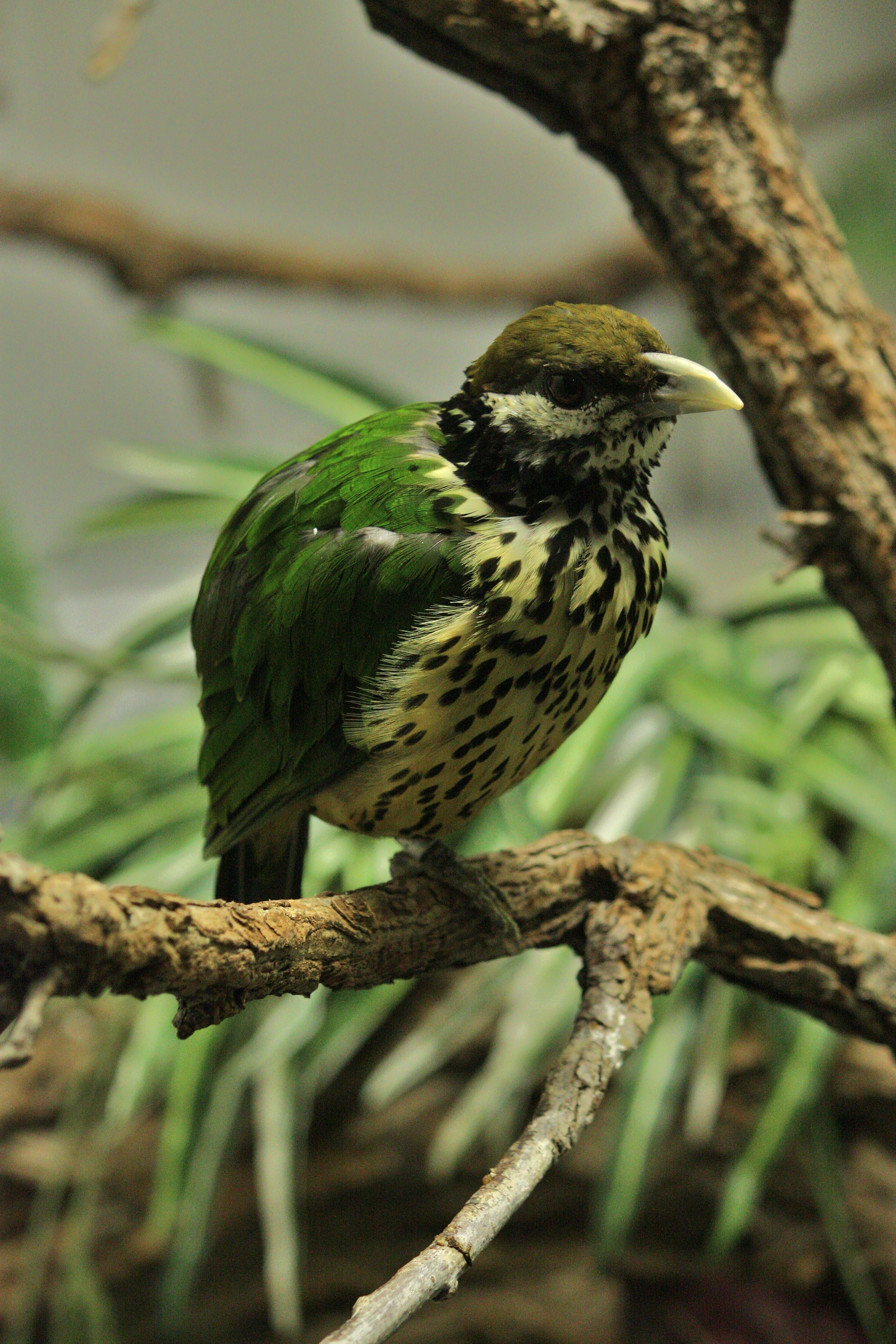
- At Denver Zoo, USA

Conservation status
- Least Concern (IUCN 3.1)

Scientific classification
- Kingdom: Animalia
- Phylum: Chordata
- Class: Aves
- Order: Passeriformes
- Family: Ptilonorhynchidae
- Genus: Ailuroedus
- Species: A. buccoides

Binomial name
- Ailuroedus buccoides (Temminck, 1836)

= White-eared catbird =

Species of bird

The white-eared catbird (Ailuroedus buccoides) is a species of bird in the family Ptilonorhynchidae found on New Guinea and the West Papuan Islands. Its natural habitats are subtropical or tropical dry forest and subtropical or tropical moist lowland forest.

Martin Irestedt and colleagues examined the white-eared catbird species complex genetically and found there were three distinct lineages: the white-eared catbird (Ailuroedus buccoides) proper of the Bird's Head (Vogelkop) Peninsula, the ochre-breasted catbird (Ailuroedus stonii) of the southern lowlands of New Guinea, and tan-capped catbird (Ailuroedus geislerorum) of the northern lowlands of New Guinea. In 2016, the ochre-breasted catbird and the tan-capped catbird were split from the white-eared catbird as separate species.

== Gallery ==
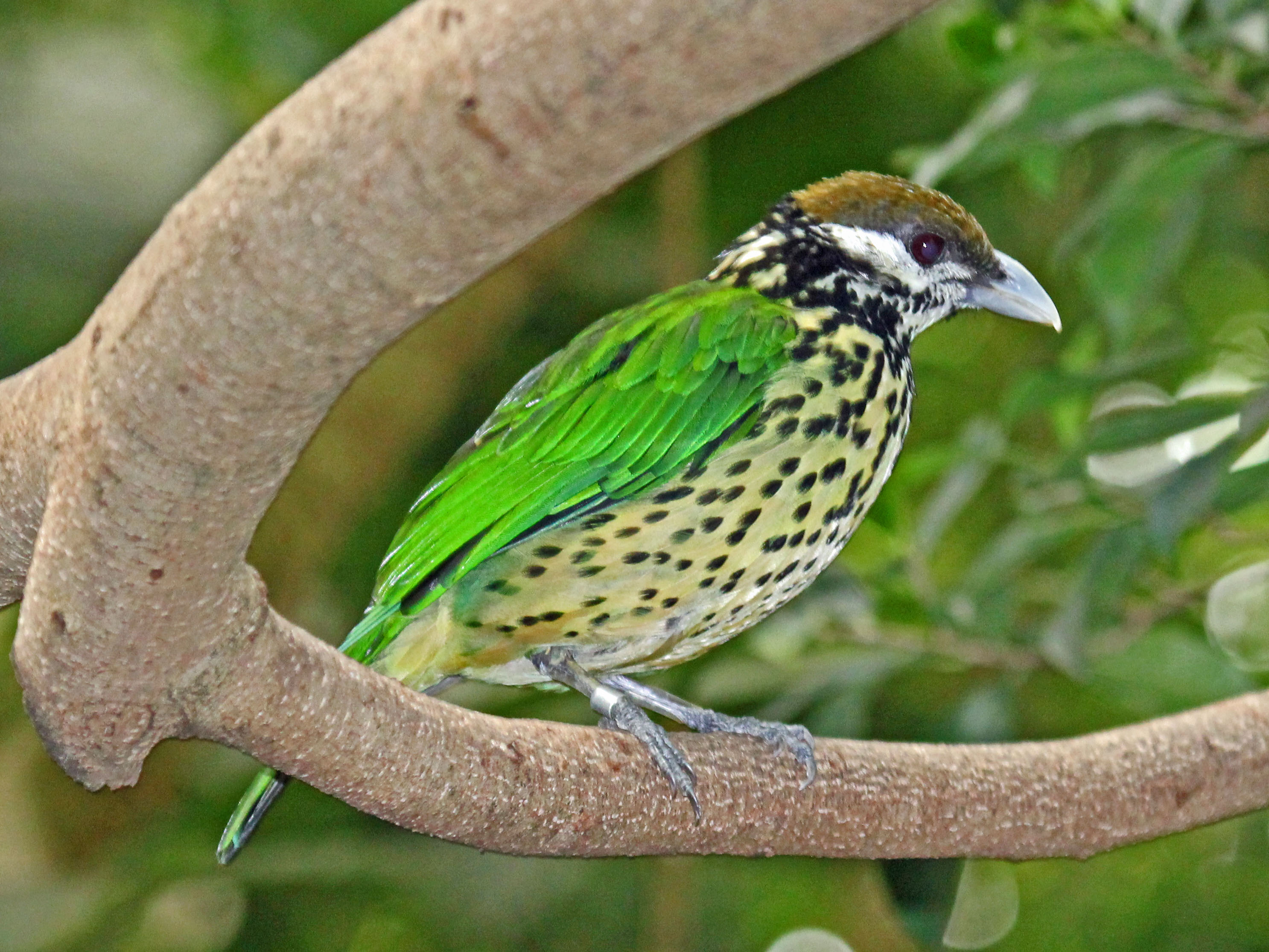
National Aviary, Pittsburgh USA
