= Hypoathroid =

Anatomic arrangement of molluscan nervous system

A hypothetical ancestral mollusc or HAM showing its hypoathroid nervous system in which the pleural and pedal ganglia are separated from the cerebral ganglia by long connectives.

The term hypoathroid (Ancient Greek hypo-, "under" + -athroid, "gathered together") is used to describe the arrangement of ganglia in the nervous system of molluscs. In the hypoathroid state, the pleural ganglia of the "chest" and the pedal ganglia of the "feet" lie close to each other more or less underneath the gut, and they communicate with the cerebral ganglia via long connectives. It is a condition that is characteristic of the Archaeogastropoda clade, and represents one end of a three-part spectrum of such arrangements, the other two being the dystenoid system in which the pleural and cerebral ganglia are closer together but still distinctly separate, and the epiathroid condition in which the pleural, pedal, and cerebral ganglia all lie close together (characteristic, for example, of the Mesogastropoda and Neogastropoda). The centralization of the nervous system generally is considered evidence of an evolutionary advancement among molluscs, while the more diffuse condition is viewed as a sign of evolutionary proximity to the hypothetical "archimollusc" ancestor of all molluscs.
