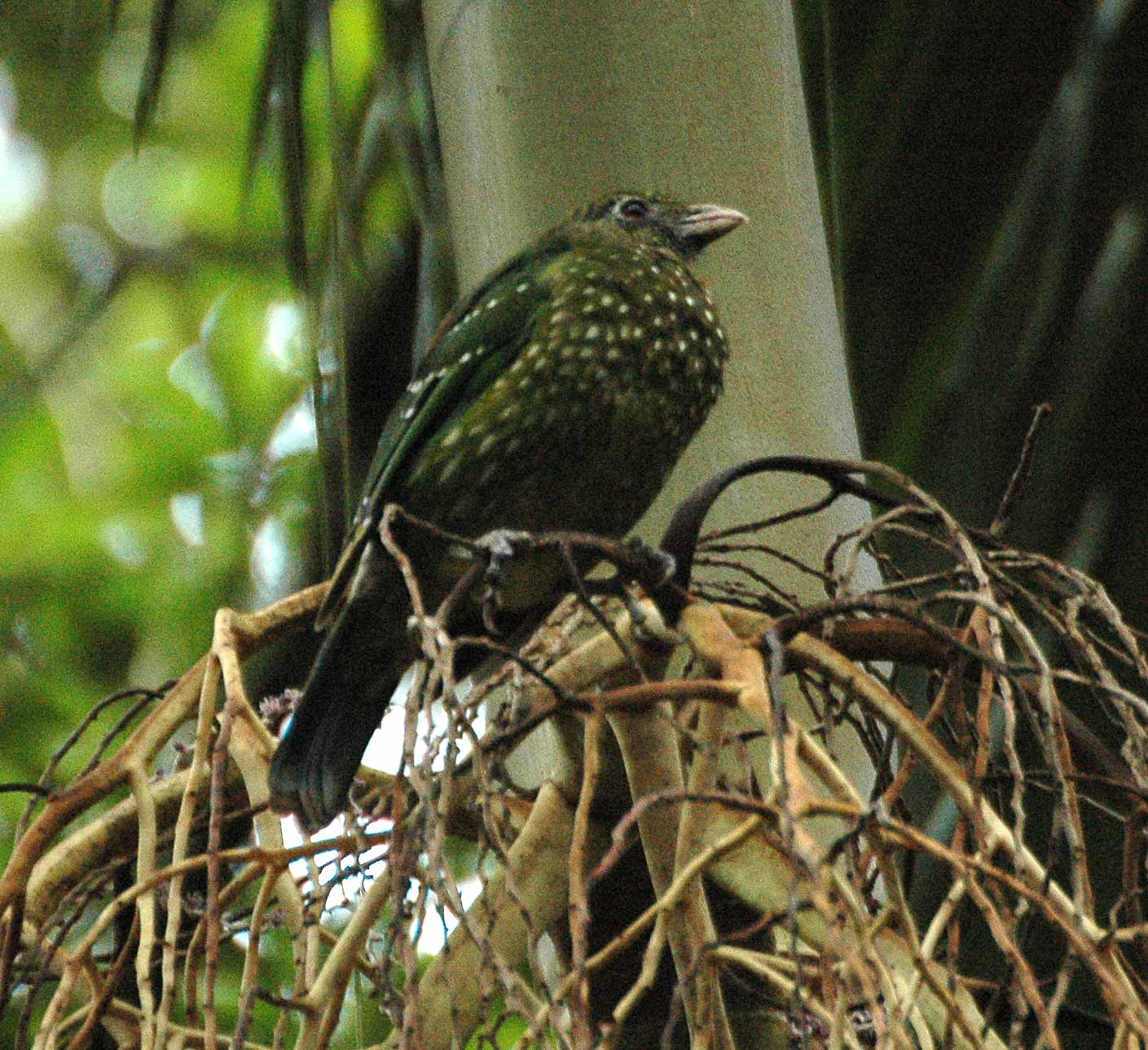

Scientific classification
- Kingdom: Animalia
- Phylum: Chordata
- Class: Aves
- Order: Passeriformes
- Family: Ptilonorhynchidae
- Genus: Ailuroedus; Cabanis, 1851

Type species
- Ptilonorhynchus smithii Vigors & Horsfield, 1827=Lanius crassirostris Paykull, 1815

Species
- see text

= Ailuroedus =

Genus of birds

Ailuroedus is a genus of birds in the bowerbird family, Ptilonorhynchidae, native to forests in Australia and New Guinea. The common name, catbird, refers to these species' "wailing cat-like calls". The scientific name Ailuroedus is derived from the Greek 'ailouros', meaning cat, and 'eidos', referring to form (or perhaps from oaidos, singer).

== Taxonomy ==
The genus Ailuroedus was introduced in 1851 by the German ornithologist Jean Cabanis to accommodate a single species, Ptilonorhynchus smithii Vigors and Horsfield. This is a junior synonym of Lanius crassirostris Paykull, 1815, the green catbird. The genus name combines the Ancient Greek αιλουρος/ailouros meaning "cat" with αοιδος/aoidos or ωδος/ōdos meaning "singer".

Traditionally, the Ailuroedus catbirds were classified as consisting as either two or three species. A 2016 genetic and morphological study by Martin Irestedt and collaborators found that the taxa formed distinct genetic lineages. Based on this result the taxa were separated into ten species. Some of the taxa were also included in a genetic study published in 2020. However in 2025 AviList reconsidered the Ailuroedus melanotis complex and chose to treat it as three rather than seven species based on the modest genetic and morphological differences.

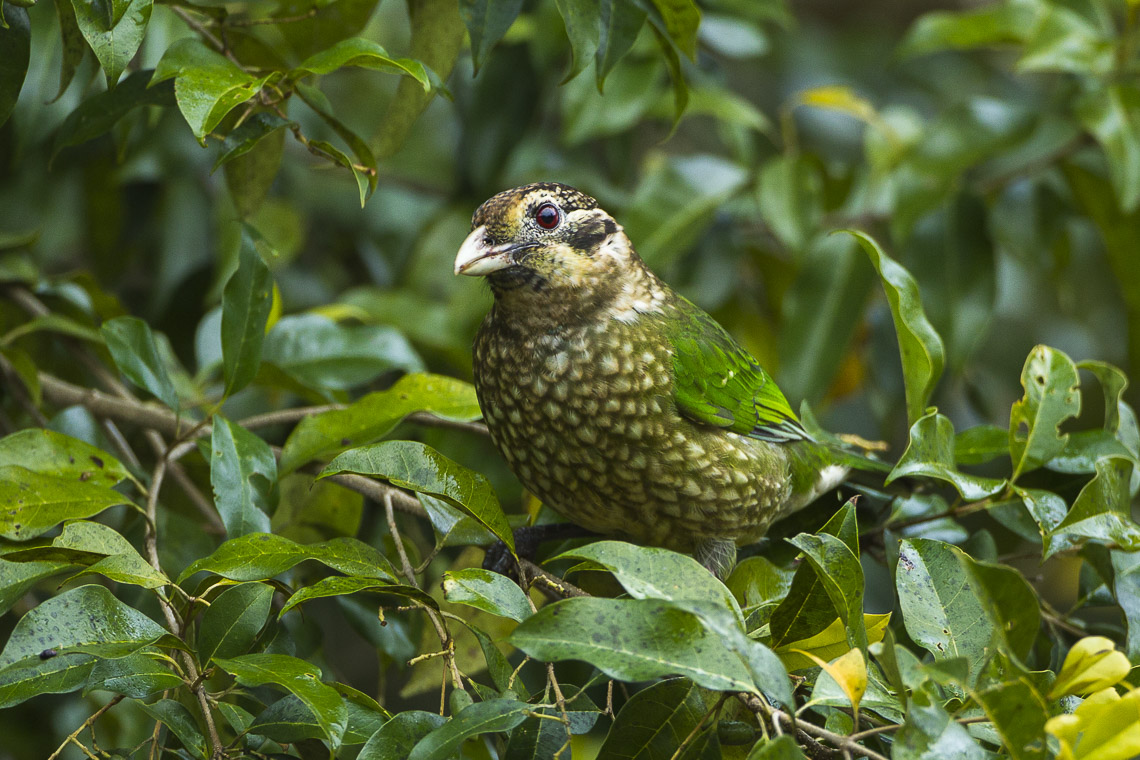
Spotted catbird, Queensland.

=== Species ===
The genus contains six species:

Image	Name	Common name	Distribution
	Ailuroedus buccoides	White-eared catbird	northwestern New Guinea eastward to southeastern Cenderawasih Bay, including Raja Ampat Islands (off western New Guinea)
	Ailuroedus stonii	Ochre-breasted catbird	south and southeast New Guinea
	Ailuroedus geislerorum	Tan-capped catbird	Yapen (Geelvink Bay, northwest New Guinea), north lowlands and north watershed of southeast New Guinea
	Ailuroedus maculosus	Spotted catbird	northeastern Australia (Wet Tropics region, northern Queensland)
	Ailuroedus melanotis	Black-eared catbird	northern Queensland, Australia, and New Guinea, including its surrounding islands (includes the Huon, Black-capped, Northern and Arfak catbirds)
	Ailuroedus crassirostris	Green catbird	eastern Australia (Kroombit Tops, southeastern Queensland to southern New South Wales)

== Description ==
Catbirds are characterize by ivory-colored bill with the hooked maxilla, large head, green dorsal plumage, ventral spotting, powerful grasping claws and fig-eating habit.

In contrast to the other genera within the Ptilonorhynchidae family, all of the Ailuroedus catbirds lack marked sexual dimorphism, are pair bonded, monogamous breeders, with both parents caring for the offspring. They form pair bonds in which the male helps to build the nest, and have simple arboreal chasing displays, without bowers or stages.
