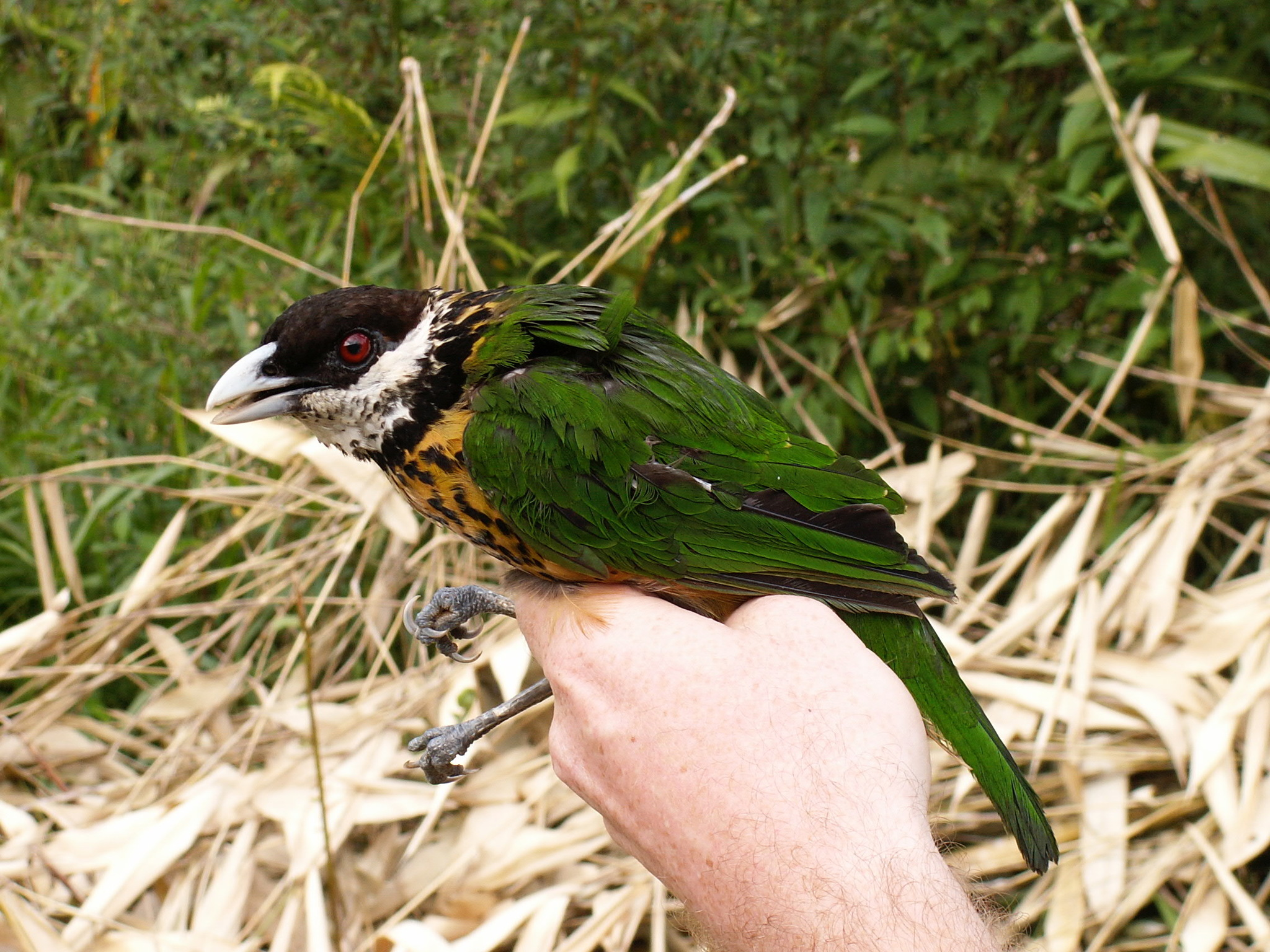

Scientific classification
- Kingdom: Animalia
- Phylum: Chordata
- Class: Aves
- Order: Passeriformes
- Family: Ptilonorhynchidae
- Genus: Ailuroedus
- Species: A. stonii

Binomial name
- Ailuroedus stonii Sharpe, 1876

Subspecies
- See text

= Ochre-breasted catbird =

Species of bird

The ochre-breasted catbird (Ailuroedus stonii) is a species of bird in the family Ptilonorhynchidae. It is found in southern New Guinea. Its natural habitats are subtropical or tropical dry forests and subtropical or tropical moist lowland forests.

Until 2016, the ochre-breasted catbird was considered conspecific with the white-eared catbird. Martin Irestedt and colleagues examined the white-eared catbird species complex genetically and found there were three distinct lineages: the white-eared catbird (Ailuroedus buccoides) proper of the Bird's Head (Vogelkop) Peninsula, the ochre-breasted catbird (Ailuroedus stonii) of the southern lowlands of New Guinea, and tan-capped catbird (Ailuroedus geislerorum) of the northern lowlands of New Guinea.

== Subspecies ==
Two subspecies are recognised:

- Ailuroedus stonii stonii – Sharpe, 1876: found in southeast New Guinea
- Ailuroedus stonii cinnamomeus – Mees, 1964: found in southeast and southwest New Guinea
