= Epiathroid =

The term epiathroid (Ancient Greek epi-, "above" + -athroid, based on the Ancient Greek for "gathered together") is used to describe the arrangement of ganglia in the nervous system of molluscs. In the epiathroid state, the pleural ganglia of the "chest" and the pedal ganglia of the "feet" lie close to the cerebral ganglia of the "head" forming a neural cluster which begins to approximate a brain. It is a condition characteristic of the Mesogastropoda and Neogastropoda, and is the obverse of the more-primitive hypoathroid condition in which the pleural and pedal ganglia lie close together under the animal's gut and communicate with the cerebral ganglia via long connectives. The Archaeogastropoda clade is described as "hypoathroid", and is the clade closest to the original hypothetical ancestral mollusc (sometimes called an "archimollusc" or a H.A.M.). In between these two extremes lie those animals with a dystenoid nervous system in which the pleural and cerebral ganglia are closer than they are in the hypoathroid condition but still further apart than they are in the epiathroid one.
