= Alphitomancy =

Form of divination using barley

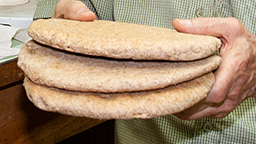
Barley bread

Alphitomancy (from Greek: ἄλφιτον, romanized: alphiton, lit. 'barley', and μαντεία, manteia, 'divination') is a form of divination involving barley cakes or loaves of barley bread.

When someone in a group was suspected of a crime, the members of the group would be fed barley cakes or slices of barley bread. Supposedly, the guilty party would get indigestion, while all others would feel well.

== See also ==
- Corsned
- Alphito
- Crithomancy
