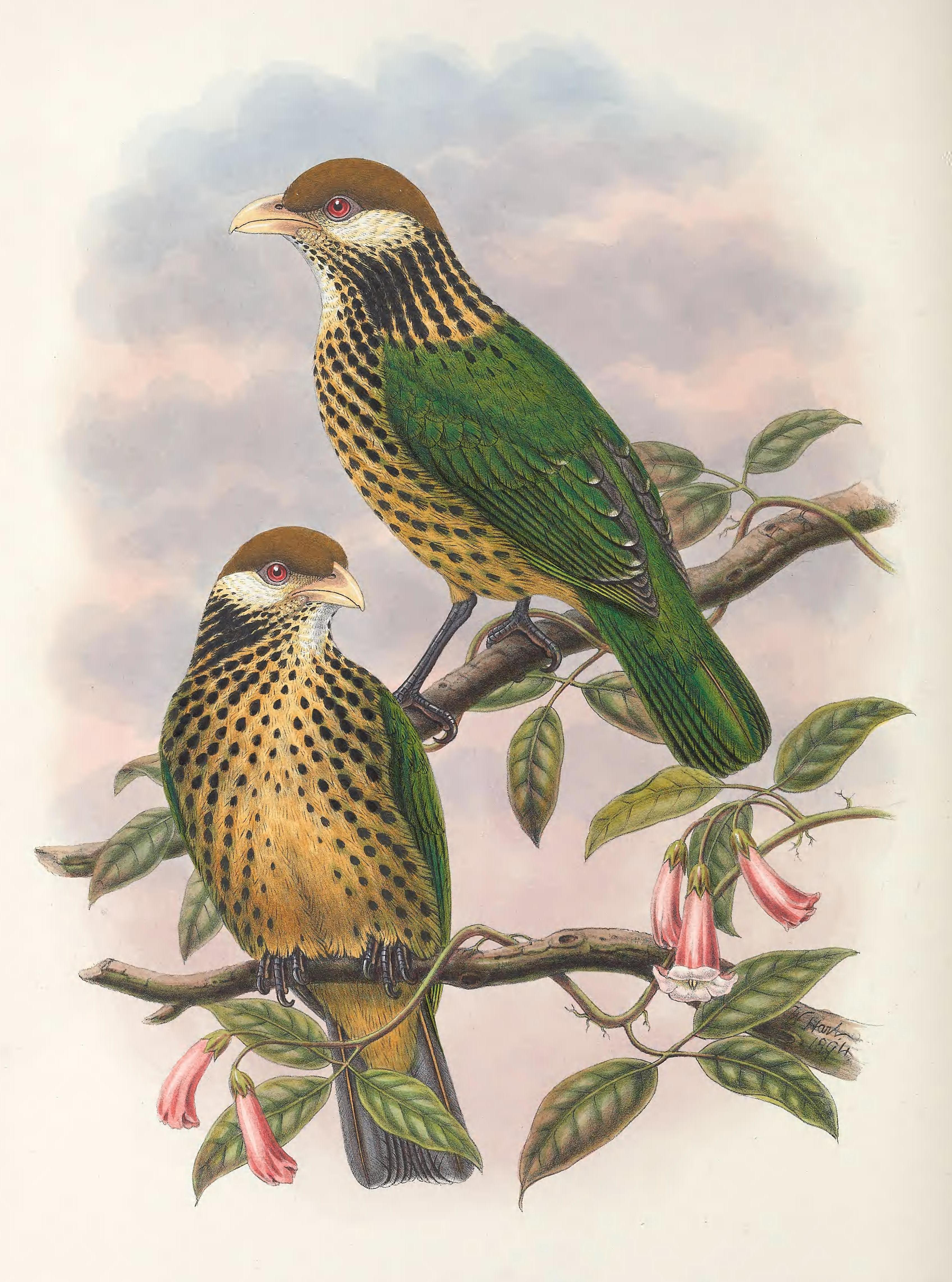

Scientific classification
- Kingdom: Animalia
- Phylum: Chordata
- Class: Aves
- Order: Passeriformes
- Family: Ptilonorhynchidae
- Genus: Ailuroedus
- Species: A. geislerorum

Binomial name
- Ailuroedus geislerorum Meyer, AB, 1891

Subspecies
- See text

= Tan-capped catbird =

Species of bird

The tan-capped catbird (Ailuroedus geislerorum) is a species of bird in the family Ptilonorhynchidae. It is found in Indonesia and Papua New Guinea. Its natural habitats are subtropical or tropical dry forests and subtropical or tropical moist lowland forests.

Until 2016, the ochre-breasted catbird was considered conspecific with the white-eared catbird. Martin Irestedt and colleagues examined the white-eared catbird species complex genetically and found there were three distinct lineages: the white-eared catbird (Ailuroedus buccoides) proper of the Bird's Head (Vogelkop) Peninsula, the ochre-breasted catbird (Ailuroedus stonii) of the southern lowlands of New Guinea, and tan-capped catbird (Ailuroedus geislerorum) of the northern lowlands of New Guinea.

== Subspecies ==
While two separate subspecies (A. g. geislerorum and A. g. molestus) are recognised by some authorities, this classification is not yet widely accepted.
