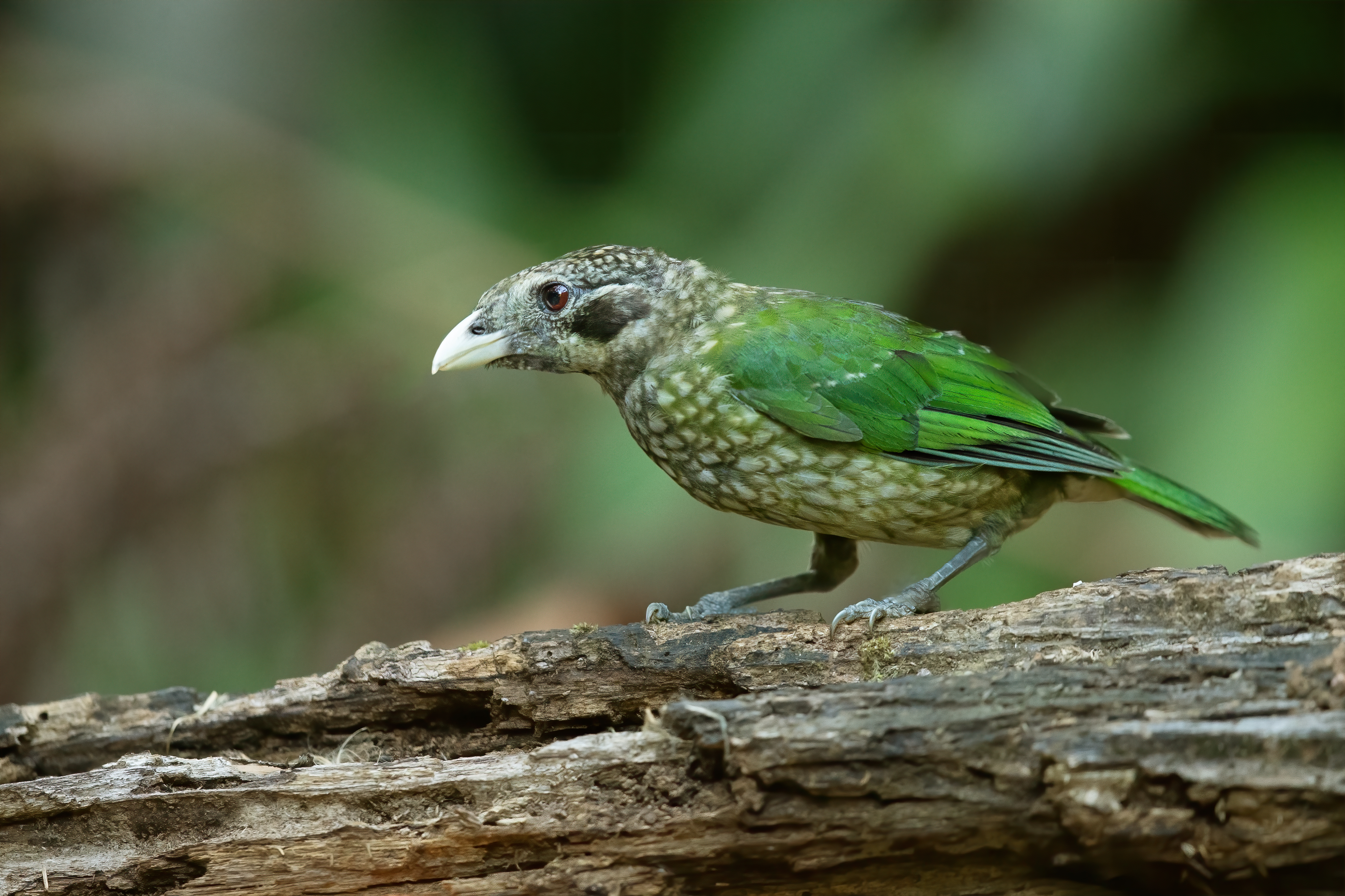

Scientific classification
- Kingdom: Animalia
- Phylum: Chordata
- Class: Aves
- Order: Passeriformes
- Family: Ptilonorhynchidae
- Genus: Ailuroedus
- Species: A. maculosus

Binomial name
- Ailuroedus maculosus Ramsay, EP, 1875

= Spotted catbird =

Species of bird

The spotted catbird (Ailuroedus maculosus) is a species of bowerbird (Ptilonorhynchidae) which can be found in north Queensland in Australia, the eastern Moluccas and New Guinea. Although it is a member of the bowerbird family, it does not build a bower.

Widespread and common throughout its large range, the spotted catbird is evaluated as Least Concern on IUCN Red List of Threatened Species. It is a chunky rainforest bird with emerald green upperparts, a black spot below the dark red eye, and green-olive underparts with extensive pale spotting. It inhabits the Wet Tropics of Queensland (Cairns region), and thus does not overlap with similar green catbird.

== Taxonomy ==
The spotted catbird is one of ten species in the genus Ailuroedus, the non bower-building bowerbirds. The noticeable difference between the two Australian dwelling species is the lack of black ear-coverts and reduction in dorsal spotting on A. cassirostris. Molecular evidence suggests Ailuroedus is a sister group to the other bowerbirds, diverging into the only genus within the eight species of Australian bowerbirds that is monogamous and does not build a bower or clear a court for mating. The other bowerbirds are polygynous and make various forms of bowers or create stages for mating. One study revealed the catbirds have a smaller brain for their body size compared to the bower-building species. Until 2016, A. maculosus was considered a subspecies of either A. melanotis, then also named the spotted catbird, or as a subspecies of A. crassirostris (green catbird).

== Habitat ==
The spotted catbird is an Australo-Papuan species. It can be found in tropical rainforest and is locally common in its range. Within Australia it has two isolated populations, both located in far north Queensland. One group occurs on Cape York and the other further south in the wet tropics region. The tropical forests of the Bellenden Ker range and adjoining scrub area from Cardwell to Cooktown may be the species "headquarters". Spotted catbirds are a highly specialized rainforest species and in the Australian wet tropics they prefer to nest in well vegetated areas with steep creek slopes and also in forests with Calamus tangles and will nest in the same location year after year. They have a home range of 1-2 hectares and forage about 68 m from their nests.

=== Habitat threats ===
Destruction of their rainforest habitat and rising temperatures could pose a threat to the spotted catbird. There have been attempts at revegetation on the Atherton Tablelands in north Queensland. This has resulted in habitat heterogeneity. These attempts may not be helpful to the habitat specific species. This rainforest fragmentation creates corridors in the attempt to provide habitat for rainforest birds. These corridors are subject to edge effects and go unused by the specialized rainforest species. However, they have been regularly detected in well-established rainforest regrowth in Australia.

== Description ==
Spotted catbirds are 26–30 cm. Males weigh 180g and females weigh 168g. Adults have a large, dusky colored head with a blackish cap and black ear-patch. They have mostly bright-green upperparts with heavy olive chevrons and white streaking on the underbody. They have slim white wing bars and a white-tipped green tail. The eye is red and it has a stout, cream colored beak. The legs and feet are dark to bluish grey. Males and females have similar plumage. Their coloring differs from other bowerbirds which have a plumage color pattern consisting of a mixture of two colors of various proportions. The cryptic plumage coloring of the catbird aids in parental care by helping the catbird blend into its surroundings allowing males and females to tend to the nestlings. It may also allow spotted catbirds to spend more time foraging as they blend into the surrounding foliage. Their voice is described as loud with cat-like wailing. They produce a nasal "here-I-arr" call with sharp clicks and three loud cries. They can be heard calling all times of the day especially at dawn and dusk and call more frequently on during cooler temperatures with dewy mornings and after rain.

== Behavior ==
A curious spotted catbird in the wet tropics of Queensland, Australia.

The following notes were made in regard to the spotted catbird's curious personality, "On entering a scrub from the roadside one may hear a Catbird call perhaps a hundred yards away. The bird will probably call several times in the next few minutes, advancing nearer and each time, until, at last, the bird will be seen arriving on a branch close to the intruder, where it will continue its harah calling at intervals, whilst watching closely its human neighbour. In all probability after a short interval the bird’s mate will arrive in answer to the calls of the first bird." They exhibit arboreal displays similar to other passerines.

== Diet ==
Spotted catbird eating fruit in the rainforest of Queensland, Australia.

The spotted catbird is mainly frugivorous. They have been seen foraging at varying altitudinal levels. They often forage on the ground and use their strong feet and powerful bills to eat small, structurally-unprotected fruit under 10mm in diameter. They also eat large, structurally-unprotected fruit between 13-21mm in diameter. Their bright green plumage may prevent them from joining foraging flocks of brown and black colored birds in the rainforest. In one observation from Cooktown, Australia, a lady stated that spotted catbirds become very bold during cumquat season and were observed feeding alongside honeyeaters on mandarins in a nearby site. They eat the seeds of palms, wild figs, berries from the stinging tree and all kinds of soft fruit. Spotted catbirds will also eat beetles and insects as well as new buds and shoots of ferns. The adults and nestlings have also been observed feeding on cicadas with parents and adults feeding cicadas to nestlings. Spotted catbirds have also been photographed attacking nests on the ground and have even been observed feeding nestlings taken from nests to their young. In one study, the imprints from the bill closely resembled the marks on dummy eggs in 87.9% of the 66 nests depredated by birds. Spotted catbirds are also known to eat birds that have become trapped in mist-nets. Nestlings are also fed severed heads and other parts of fruit dove squabs. It has also been suggested that catbirds eat small, soft-shelled snails.

== Reproduction ==
=== Mating ===
The Ailuroedus genus of the bowerbird family consists of monogamous pairs that do not build a bower. The males and females both defend an all-purpose territory. Spotted catbirds form pair bonds, some which are known to last for more than one breeding season and it is believed that this monogamy results from the need for two parents to raise the brood successfully. During courtship the pair excitedly hop around perches in trees and the male makes sharp tic notes until the female sits still. The male then hops around the female between two perches usually with food in his beak. There has been one observation of catbirds mating in captivity which Firth describes, "He held some food in his bill, drew close to the female and stretched his head and neck up vertically to full extent while looking at her so that the somewhat erected feathers of the neck appeared sparse. He directly mounted the crouching female for a few seconds and the two birds then flew together directly to the ground, the male still holding the food in his bill. Once on the ground the male passed the food to the female, who took and swallowed it. Both birds then flew off together. The breeding season is from August to March.

=== Nest ===
Spotted catbirds build a nest instead of making a bower. Only females build the nest. Nesting begins in September when rainfall and temperatures increase. The nest is about nine inches wide and six to eight inches deep. The egg cavity in five and a half inches wide and three inches deep. The nest foundation is made up of sticks and twigs around a lower nest cup. The bowl is composed of medium-sized dry leaves, leaf skeletons and vine tendrils. In the bottom of the bowl, decaying wood pulp is arranged with pieces of mud or clay. The nest egg cup lining made of vine tendrils is placed in the bottom of the bowl. Nests have been found built on top of old ones from years past and new nests may be built close to old ones. Incubation of the eggs lasts an average of 22-23 days and the average nestling period is 19-20 days. Spotted catbirds protect their nests by working together to distract any intruder. When a couple of observers approached a nest, "both sexes became greatly agitated and the presumed male would perch close by, restlessly shifting his position and singing his strange song – ‘meeyooweh’. He put a great deal of energy into these songs, tossing his head back as he did so and ending each with a squeak. Meanwhile, the other bird would perform a distraction display, running along the ground rapidly with tail fanned so that the white terminal spots were prominent, and making peculiar squeaking sounds."

=== Eggs ===
There are usually two, but possibly three eggs which are glossy, cream colored and oval in shape. There is some tapering slightly towards the small end and the shell is close-grained and smooth. The eggs are laid at long intervals which has also been observed in the Green catbird. These eggs are laid on alternate days about 48 hours apart. The female is the sole incubator of the eggs.
