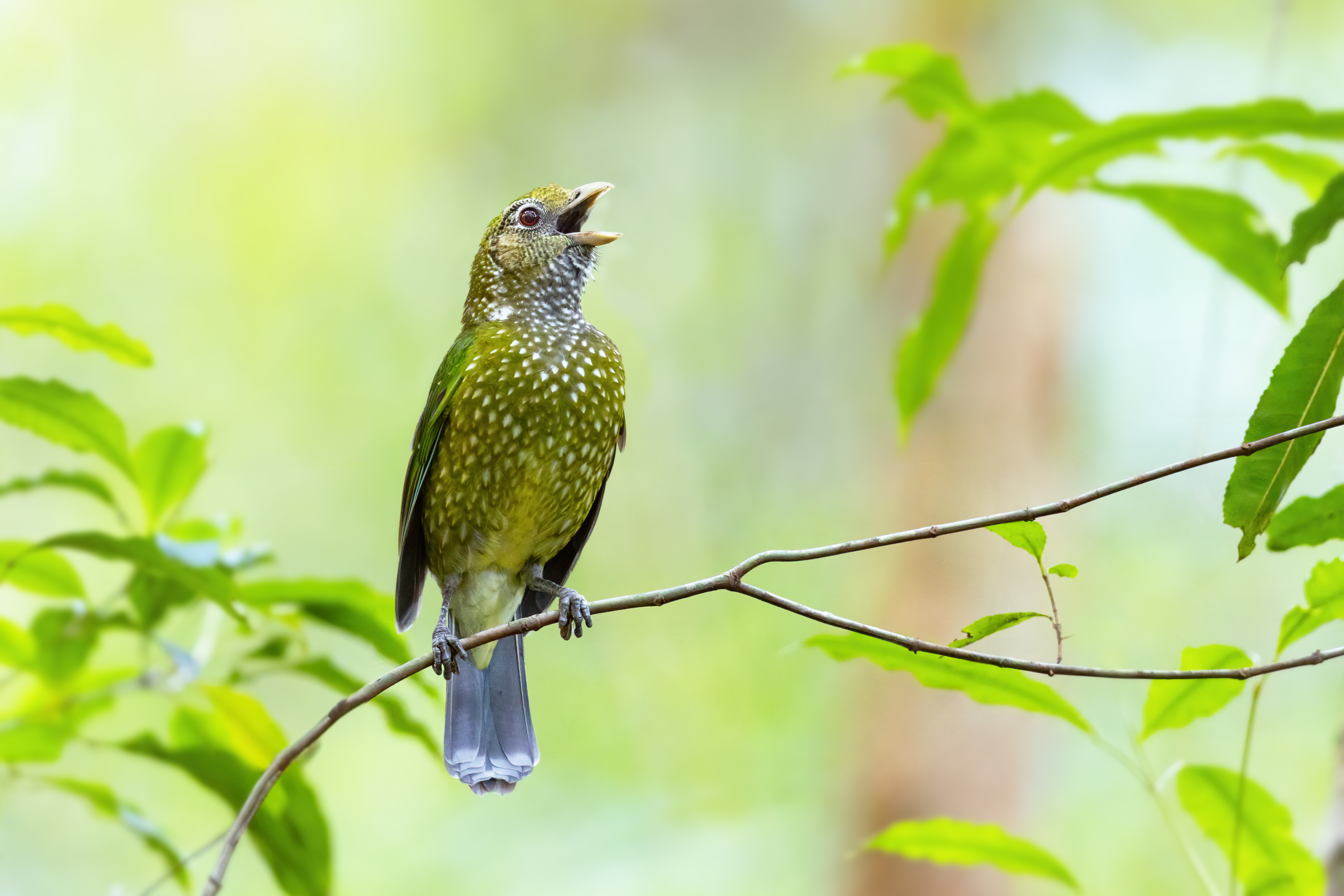

Conservation status
- Least Concern (IUCN 3.1)

Scientific classification
- Kingdom: Animalia
- Phylum: Chordata
- Class: Aves
- Order: Passeriformes
- Family: Ptilonorhynchidae
- Genus: Ailuroedus
- Species: A. crassirostris

Binomial name
- Ailuroedus crassirostris (Paykull, 1815)
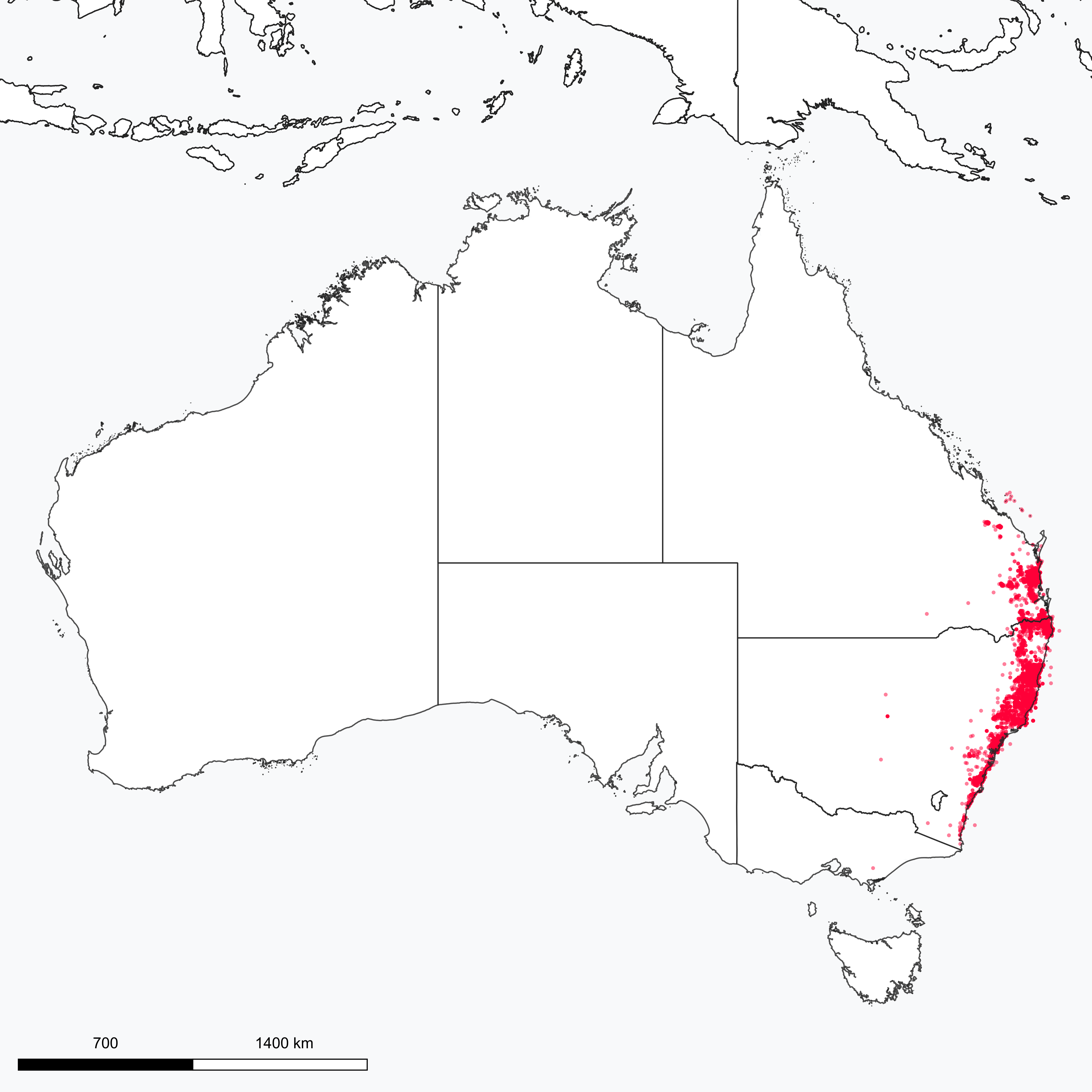
- Species distribution

Audio
- A recording of a green catbird at Bunya Mountains National Park

= Green catbird =

Species of bird

The green catbird (Ailuroedus crassirostris) is a species of bowerbird found in subtropical forests along the east coast of Australia, from southeastern Queensland to southern New South Wales. It is named after its distinctive call which sounds like a cat meowing, although it has also been mistaken for a crying child. The green catbird resembles the spotted catbird, which is found in wet tropical rainforests of Far North Queensland.

== Description ==
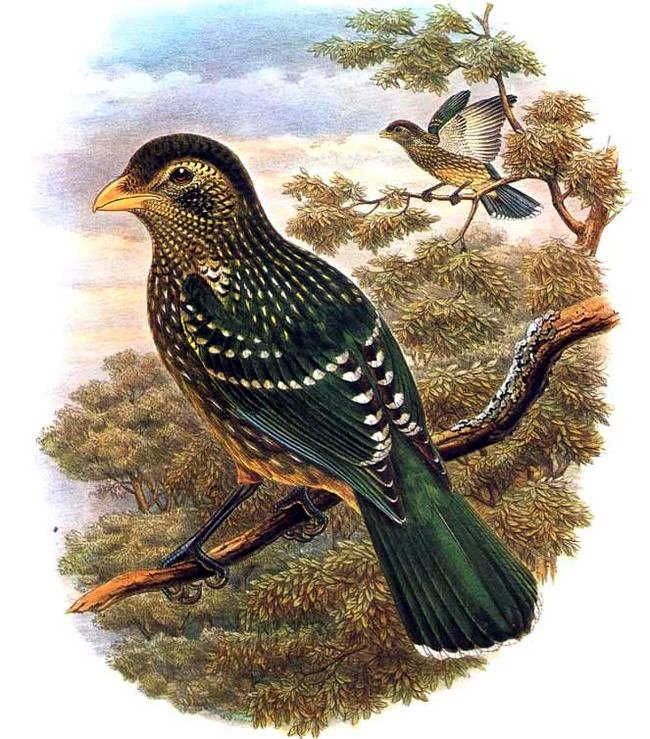
Illustration by Richard Bowdler Sharpe

Green catbirds are a medium-sized stocky bird with long, powerful legs and a long, stout bill. The back, wings and rump are brilliant emerald green, with very conspicuous pure white spots at the tips of the tertiaries and secondaries, which, on the tips of coverts, form two white wing-bars. The tail is brownish emerald with white tips. The head is greenish brown mottled black and finely flecked pale buff. The chest is greenish buff to dull emerald with distinctive short white streaks.

The bill is horn coloured and the legs are greyish brown.

The iris is bright red in direct sun with a partial white eye-ring.

Male and female birds share similar plumage, making it very difficult to distinguish between the sexes. Juvenile birds also have similar plumage, although it is duller. Very young birds have fluffy grey down on their heads (Donaghey. R. 1996).

== Call ==
The green catbird's call varies from a short, recognisable "heer-I-aar" to a long, drawn-out, quavering version: "heeeir-Ieee-aaa-aarr".

== Distribution and habitat ==
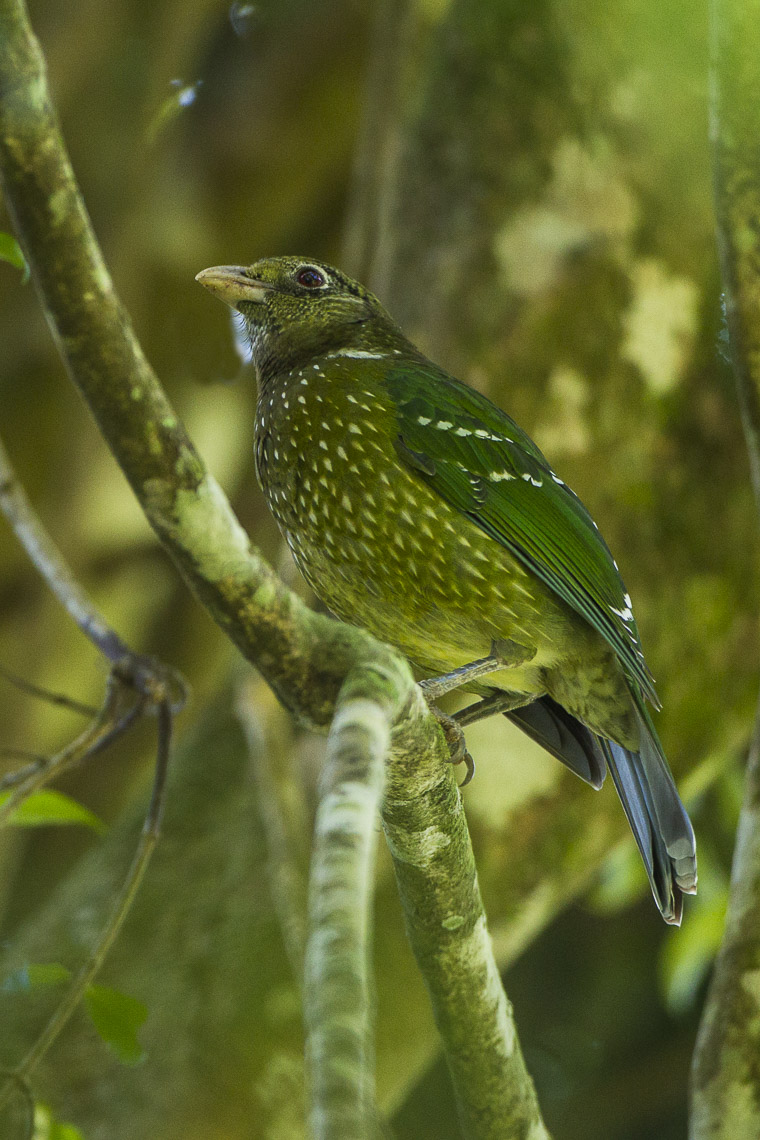
Green catbird in Lamington National Park, Queensland

According to The Field Guide to Australian Birds (Michael Morcombe, 2003) (2nd edition), green catbirds are found along the length of the east coast of NSW (in areas of suitable habitat) through to the Cooloola Coast in South East Queensland.

The birds are found in subtropical and temperate rainforest and paperbarks, and occasionally in adjacent eucalypt forest.

The average home range of the birds is two hectares, although this is greatly reduced during breeding season. Breeding territories usually contain several fig trees which regularly produce large amounts of ripe fruit for several months which coincides with the catbird breeding season. Green catbirds drink and bath in pools of water that are found in the crevices of surrounding trees or water courses.

== Breeding and life cycle ==
Unlike other male bower birds, the male green catbird does not build a bower, however the male will clear an area from which he will perform and display to other females. Similar to other male bower birds, he will attempt to attract females by displaying colourful fruits, flowers and leaves in his beak.

Green catbirds are monogamous breeders. Once a female accepts a male they will mate for life. The pair bonding is maintained by the male feeding the female throughout the year, as well as by calls in duet.

The breeding season is usually from October to January, although can be as early as September and as late as March. The nest is a large and bulky; built of large sticks bound with vine tendrils and with an inner lining of dry leaves. The nest interiors are noted for having an unusual layer of wet, soft decayed wood beneath the lining of fine twigs and leaves; adding to its overall large size relative to the size of the bird.

The nest is placed in the dense crown of a low understorey tree where there are many twigs and stems to support its bulk, or in thorny or stinging trees, the crown of a tree fern, or in the upwardly cupped fronds of a bird's nest fern.

The clutch typically consists of 2 - 3 eggs which are incubated by the female for 23 – 24 days.

The male assists in rearing the young through the 20 – 22 days to fledging.

No detailed studies have been undertaken on the longevity of the bird in the wild or in captivity, although the average lifespan in the wild is thought to be around eight years and one bird in captivity was known to have lived for at least fifteen years.

== Social behaviour ==
Although usually seen individually, green catbirds typically socialize in pairs but can be seen in groups of 3–5 at the end of breeding season when their young are still somewhat dependent on their parents. Green catbirds do not flock but outside of breeding seasons it is not uncommon to see them in groups of around 20 birds all feeding in mutual territories, this is most common during winter fruiting seasons. Amongst these groups of green catbirds other species that can be found during these communal feeds are satin bowerbirds, regent bowerbirds and fig birds.

Green catbirds will constantly spend their time seeking out food sources both inside and outside their territories and fiercely defend food sources within their territory from other males and females. Patrolling their territory also makes up a large portion of their daily activity. They will be heard regularly calling but this is most common during breeding season, when predators are in the vicinity of nests and when engaging other birds in territorial battles.

== Diet ==
Green catbirds are classified as omnivorous but are mainly frugivorous (native, introduced or cultivated), feeding on figs and a variety of vegetable matter such as buds, shoots, flowers and seeds. Catbirds will also be seen in cultivated fruit orchards when their naturally occurring food sources become scarce. Their diet is also supplemented with insects such as grasshoppers, cicadas, beetles, millipedes and mites and small vertebrates such as tree frogs and hatchlings of smaller birds that inhabit their area.

Green catbirds forage in trees, active and wary, moving from limb to limb in the mid to upper strata as they forage.

== Conservation status and threats ==
Although the green catbird is listed as Least Concern on IUCN Red List of Threatened Species, it is listed as Vulnerable in NSW, which is the majority of its range.

Although it is widespread and common in its favoured habitat, ongoing clearing of rainforest and paperbark swamps for development is likely to continue to threaten the green catbird in the future.
