= Actinozoa =

Obsolescent term in systematic zoology

Actinozoa is an obsolescent term in systematic zoology, first used by Henri Marie Ducrotay de Blainville in his Manuel d'Actinologie (1834) to designate animals the organs of which were disposed radially about a centre. De Blainville included in his group many unicellular forms, sea anemones, corals, jellyfish, hydroid polyps, echinoderms, polyzoa, and rotifera.

Thomas Huxley afterwards applied the term in a restricted sense. He showed that within de Blainville's group, along with a number of heterogeneous forms, there was a group of animals characterized by being composed of two layers of cells comparable with the first two layers in the development of vertebrate animals. These he called Coelentera, and showed that they had no special affinity with echinoderms, polyzoa, etc. He further divided the Coelentera into a group Hydrozoa, in which the sexually produced embryos were usually set free from the surface of the body, and a group Actinozoa, in which the embryos are detached from the interior of the body and escape generally by the oral aperture. Huxley's Actinozoa comprised the sea-anemones, corals and sea pens, on the one hand, and the Ctenophora (comb jellies) on the other.

Modern biology confirms Huxley's criticism of De Blainville's Actinozoa, and upholds Hydrozoa, but it is now known that the Ctenophora are only distantly related to jellyfish and their relatives, so Huxley's Actinozoa and Coelentera are no longer used (though the name Actinozoa is occasionally applied to the Anthozoa). Modern taxonomies place the comb jellies in their own phylum Ctenophora and the jellyfish, sea anemones, and Hydrozoa together in the phylum Cnidaria.
