= List of antbird species =

The avian family Thamnophilidae is usually called the typical antbirds. The International Ornithological Committee (IOC) recognizes these 238 species distributed among 63 genera in the family, 24 of which have only one species. Confusingly, only 96 of the species are called "antbirds"; the others are variously named antwren, antshrike, antvireo, bushbird, bare-eye, fire-eye, and stipplethroat.

This list is presented according to the IOC taxonomic sequence and can also be sorted alphabetically by common name and binomial.

== List ==
Common name	Binomial name + authority	IOC sequence
Rufous-rumped antwren	Euchrepomis callinota (Sclater, PL, 1855)	1
Chestnut-shouldered antwren	Euchrepomis humeralis (Sclater, PL & Salvin, 1880)	2
Yellow-rumped antwren	Euchrepomis sharpei (Berlepsch, 1901)	3
Ash-winged antwren	Euchrepomis spodioptila (Sclater, PL & Salvin, 1881)	4
Wing-banded antbird	Myrmornis torquata (Boddaert, 1783)	5
Spot-winged antshrike	Pygiptila stellaris (Spix, 1825)	6
Russet antshrike	Thamnistes anabatinus Sclater, PL & Salvin, 1860	7
Rufescent antshrike	Thamnistes rufescens Cabanis, 1873	8
Dot-winged antwren	Microrhopias quixensis (Cornalia, 1849)	9
Black bushbird	Neoctantes niger (Pelzeln, 1859)	10
Recurve-billed bushbird	Clytoctantes alixii Elliot, DG, 1870	11
Rondonia bushbird	Clytoctantes atrogularis Lanyon, S, Stotz & Willard, 1991	12
Checker-throated stipplethroat	Epinecrophylla fulviventris (Lawrence, 1862)	13
Brown-bellied stipplethroat	Epinecrophylla gutturalis (Sclater, PL & Salvin, 1881)	14
White-eyed stipplethroat	Epinecrophylla leucophthalma (Pelzeln, 1868)	15
Rufous-backed stipplethroat	Epinecrophylla haematonota (Sclater, PL, 1857)	16
Rio Madeira stipplethroat	Epinecrophylla amazonica (Ihering, HFA, 1905)	17
Foothill stipplethroat	Epinecrophylla spodionota (Sclater, PL & Salvin, 1880)	18
Ornate stipplethroat	Epinecrophylla ornata (Sclater, PL, 1853)	19
Rufous-tailed stipplethroat	Epinecrophylla erythrura (Sclater, PL, 1890)	20
Stripe-backed antbird	Myrmorchilus strigilatus (Wied-Neuwied, M, 1831)	21
Yapacana antbird	Aprositornis disjuncta (Friedmann, 1945)	22
Grey-bellied antbird	Ammonastes pelzelni (Sclater, PL, 1890)	23
Black-throated antbird	Myrmophylax atrothorax (Boddaert, 1783)	24
Moustached antwren	Myrmotherula ignota Griscom, 1929	25
Pygmy antwren	Myrmotherula brachyura (Hermann, 1783)	26
Guianan streaked antwren	Myrmotherula surinamensis (Gmelin, JF, 1788)	27
Amazonian streaked antwren	Myrmotherula multostriata Sclater, PL, 1858	28
Pacific antwren	Myrmotherula pacifica Hellmayr, 1911	29
Cherrie's antwren	Myrmotherula cherriei Berlepsch & Hartert, EJO, 1902	30
Klages's antwren	Myrmotherula klagesi Todd, 1927	31
Stripe-chested antwren	Myrmotherula longicauda Berlepsch & Stolzmann, 1894	32
Yellow-throated antwren	Myrmotherula ambigua Zimmer, JT, 1932	33
Sclater's antwren	Myrmotherula sclateri Snethlage, E, 1912	34
White-flanked antwren	Myrmotherula axillaris (Vieillot, 1817)	35
Silvery-flanked antwren	Myrmotherula luctuosa Pelzeln, 1868	36
Slaty antwren	Myrmotherula schisticolor (Lawrence, 1865)	37
Rio Suno antwren	Myrmotherula sunensis Chapman, 1925	38
Salvadori's antwren	Myrmotherula minor Salvadori, 1864	39
Long-winged antwren	Myrmotherula longipennis Pelzeln, 1868	40
Band-tailed antwren	Myrmotherula urosticta (Sclater, PL, 1857)	41
Ihering's antwren	Myrmotherula iheringi Snethlage, E, 1914	42
Rio de Janeiro antwren	Myrmotherula fluminensis Gonzaga, 1988	43
Yungas antwren	Myrmotherula grisea Carriker, 1935	44
Unicolored antwren	Myrmotherula unicolor (Ménétriés, 1835)	45
Alagoas antwren	Myrmotherula snowi Teixeira & Gonzaga, 1985	46
Plain-winged antwren	Myrmotherula behni Berlepsch & Leverkühn, 1890	47
Grey antwren	Myrmotherula menetriesii (d'Orbigny, 1837)	48
Leaden antwren	Myrmotherula assimilis Pelzeln, 1868	49
Streak-capped antwren	Terenura maculata (Wied-Neuwied, M, 1831)	50
Orange-bellied antwren	Terenura sicki Teixeira & Gonzaga, 1983	51
Black-and-white antbird	Myrmochanes hemileucus (Sclater, PL & Salvin, 1866)	52
Narrow-billed antwren	Formicivora iheringi Hellmayr, 1909	53
Black-hooded antwren	Formicivora erythronotos Hartlaub, 1852	54
Southern white-fringed antwren	Formicivora grisea (Boddaert, 1783)	55
Northern white-fringed antwren	Formicivora intermedia Cabanis, 1847	56
Serra antwren	Formicivora serrana (Hellmayr, 1929)	57
Black-bellied antwren	Formicivora melanogaster Pelzeln, 1868	58
Rusty-backed antwren	Formicivora rufa (Wied-Neuwied, M, 1831)	59
Sincora antwren	Formicivora grantsaui Gonzaga, Carvalhaes & Buzzetti, 2007	60
Marsh antwren	Formicivora acutirostris (Bornschein, Reinert & Teixeira, 1995)	61
Banded antbird	Dichrozona cincta (Pelzeln, 1868)	62
Star-throated antwren	Rhopias gularis (Spix, 1825)	63
Plain-throated antwren	Isleria hauxwelli (Sclater, PL, 1857)	64
Rufous-bellied antwren	Isleria guttata (Vieillot, 1824)	65
Dusky-throated antshrike	Thamnomanes ardesiacus (Sclater, PL & Salvin, 1868)	66
Saturnine antshrike	Thamnomanes saturninus (Pelzeln, 1868)	67
Cinereous antshrike	Thamnomanes caesius (Temminck, 1820)	68
Bluish-slate antshrike	Thamnomanes schistogynus Hellmayr, 1911	69
Pearly antshrike	Megastictus margaritatus (Sclater, PL, 1855)	70
Silvery-cheeked antshrike	Sakesphoroides cristatus (Wied-Neuwied, M, 1831)	71
Bahia antwren	Herpsilochmus pileatus (Lichtenstein, MHC, 1823)	72
Black-capped antwren	Herpsilochmus atricapillus Pelzeln, 1868	73
Aripuana antwren	Herpsilochmus stotzi Whitney, Cohn-Haft, Bravo, Schunck & Silveira, 2013	74
Predicted antwren	Herpsilochmus praedictus Cohn-Haft & Bravo, 2013	75
Creamy-bellied antwren	Herpsilochmus motacilloides Taczanowski, 1874	76
Ash-throated antwren	Herpsilochmus parkeri Davis, TJ & O'Neill, 1986	77
Spot-tailed antwren	Herpsilochmus sticturus Salvin, 1885	78
Dugand's antwren	Herpsilochmus dugandi Meyer de Schauensee, 1945	79
Todd's antwren	Herpsilochmus stictocephalus Todd, 1927	80
Spot-backed antwren	Herpsilochmus dorsimaculatus Pelzeln, 1868	81
Roraiman antwren	Herpsilochmus roraimae Hellmayr, 1903	82
Pectoral antwren	Herpsilochmus pectoralis Sclater, PL, 1857	83
Large-billed antwren	Herpsilochmus longirostris Pelzeln, 1868	84
Ancient antwren	Herpsilochmus gentryi Whitney & Álvarez A, J, 1998	85
Yellow-breasted antwren	Herpsilochmus axillaris (Tschudi, 1844)	86
Rusty-winged antwren	Herpsilochmus frater Sclater, PL & Salvin, 1880	87
Rufous-margined antwren	Herpsilochmus rufimarginatus (Temminck, 1822)	88
Spot-breasted antvireo	Dysithamnus stictothorax (Temminck, 1823)	89
Plain antvireo	Dysithamnus mentalis (Temminck, 1823)	90
Streak-crowned antvireo	Dysithamnus striaticeps Lawrence, 1865	91
Spot-crowned antvireo	Dysithamnus puncticeps Salvin, 1866	92
Rufous-backed antvireo	Dysithamnus xanthopterus Burmeister, 1856	93
Bicolored antvireo	Dysithamnus occidentalis (Chapman, 1923)	94
Plumbeous antvireo	Dysithamnus plumbeus (Wied-Neuwied, M, 1831)	95
White-streaked antvireo	Dysithamnus leucostictus Sclater, PL, 1858	96
Collared antshrike	Thamnophilus bernardi Lesson, RP, 1844	97
Black-backed antshrike	Thamnophilus melanonotus Sclater, PL, 1855	98
Band-tailed antshrike	Thamnophilus melanothorax Sclater, PL, 1857	99
Barred antshrike	Thamnophilus doliatus (Linnaeus, 1764)	100
Chapman's antshrike	Thamnophilus zarumae Chapman, 1921	101
Bar-crested antshrike	Thamnophilus multistriatus Lafresnaye, 1844	102
Lined antshrike	Thamnophilus tenuepunctatus Lafresnaye, 1853	103
Chestnut-backed antshrike	Thamnophilus palliatus (Lichtenstein, MHC, 1823)	104
Black-hooded antshrike	Thamnophilus bridgesi Sclater, PL, 1856	105
Black antshrike	Thamnophilus nigriceps Sclater, PL, 1869	106
Cocha antshrike	Thamnophilus praecox Zimmer, JT, 1937	107
Blackish-grey antshrike	Thamnophilus nigrocinereus Sclater, PL, 1855	108
Castelnau's antshrike	Thamnophilus cryptoleucus (Ménégaux & Hellmayr, 1906)	109
White-shouldered antshrike	Thamnophilus aethiops Sclater, PL, 1858	110
Uniform antshrike	Thamnophilus unicolor (Sclater, PL, 1859)	111
Plain-winged antshrike	Thamnophilus schistaceus d'Orbigny, 1837	112
Mouse-colored antshrike	Thamnophilus murinus Sclater, PL & Salvin, 1868	113
Upland antshrike	Thamnophilus aroyae (Hellmayr, 1904)	114
Black-crowned antshrike	Thamnophilus atrinucha Salvin & Godman, 1892	115
Northern slaty antshrike	Thamnophilus punctatus (Shaw, 1809)	116
Natterer's slaty antshrike	Thamnophilus stictocephalus Pelzeln, 1868	117
Bolivian slaty antshrike	Thamnophilus sticturus Pelzeln, 1868	118
Planalto slaty antshrike	Thamnophilus pelzelni Hellmayr, 1924	119
Sooretama slaty antshrike	Thamnophilus ambiguus Swainson, 1825	120
Amazonian antshrike	Thamnophilus amazonicus Sclater, PL, 1858	121
Acre antshrike	Thamnophilus divisorius Whitney, Oren & Brumfield, 2004	122
Streak-backed antshrike	Thamnophilus insignis Salvin & Godman, 1884	123
Variable antshrike	Thamnophilus caerulescens Vieillot, 1816	124
Rufous-winged antshrike	Thamnophilus torquatus Swainson, 1825	125
Rufous-capped antshrike	Thamnophilus ruficapillus Vieillot, 1816	126
Black-crested antshrike	Sakesphorus canadensis (Linnaeus, 1766)	127
Glossy antshrike	Sakesphorus luctuosus (Lichtenstein, MHC, 1823)	128
Caatinga antwren	Radinopsyche sellowi (Whitney & Pacheco, 2000)	129
White-bearded antshrike	Biatas nigropectus (Lafresnaye, 1850)	130
Fasciated antshrike	Cymbilaimus lineatus (Leach, 1814)	131
Bamboo antshrike	Cymbilaimus sanctaemariae Gyldenstolpe, 1941	132
Great antshrike	Taraba major (Vieillot, 1816)	133
Large-tailed antshrike	Mackenziaena leachii (Such, 1825)	134
Tufted antshrike	Mackenziaena severa (Lichtenstein, MHC, 1823)	135
Black-throated antshrike	Frederickena viridis (Vieillot, 1816)	136
Undulated antshrike	Frederickena unduliger (Pelzeln, 1868)	137
Fulvous antshrike	Frederickena fulva Zimmer, JT, 1944	138
Spot-backed antshrike	Hypoedaleus guttatus (Vieillot, 1816)	139
Giant antshrike	Batara cinerea (Vieillot, 1819)	140
Speckled antshrike	Xenornis setifrons Chapman, 1924	141
White-plumed antbird	Pithys albifrons (Linnaeus, 1766)	142
White-masked antbird	Pithys castaneus Berlioz, 1938	143
Ocellated antbird	Phaenostictus mcleannani (Lawrence, 1860)	144
Bicolored antbird	Gymnopithys bicolor (Lawrence, 1863)	145
White-cheeked antbird	Gymnopithys leucaspis (Sclater, PL, 1855)	146
Rufous-throated antbird	Gymnopithys rufigula (Boddaert, 1783)	147
White-throated antbird	Oneillornis salvini (Berlepsch, 1901)	148
Lunulated antbird	Oneillornis lunulatus (Sclater, PL & Salvin, 1873)	149
Bare-eyed antbird	Rhegmatorhina gymnops Ridgway, 1888	150
Harlequin antbird	Rhegmatorhina berlepschi (Snethlage, E, 1907)	151
White-breasted antbird	Rhegmatorhina hoffmannsi (Hellmayr, 1907)	152
Chestnut-crested antbird	Rhegmatorhina cristata (Pelzeln, 1868)	153
Hairy-crested antbird	Rhegmatorhina melanosticta (Sclater, PL & Salvin, 1880)	154
Black-spotted bare-eye	Phlegopsis nigromaculata (d'Orbigny & Lafresnaye, 1837)	155
Reddish-winged bare-eye	Phlegopsis erythroptera (Gould, 1855)	156
Pale-faced bare-eye	Phlegopsis borbae Hellmayr, 1907	157
Common scale-backed antbird	Willisornis poecilinotus (Cabanis, 1847)	158
Xingu scale-backed antbird	Willisornis vidua (Hellmayr, 1905)	159
Ferruginous antbird	Drymophila ferruginea (Temminck, 1822)	160
Bertoni's antbird	Drymophila rubricollis (Bertoni, AW, 1901)	161
Rufous-tailed antbird	Drymophila genei (de Filippi, 1847)	162
Ochre-rumped antbird	Drymophila ochropyga (Hellmayr, 1906)	163
Dusky-tailed antbird	Drymophila malura (Temminck, 1825)	164
Scaled antbird	Drymophila squamata (Lichtenstein, MHC, 1823)	165
Striated antbird	Drymophila devillei (Ménégaux & Hellmayr, 1906)	166
Santa Marta antbird	Drymophila hellmayri Todd, 1915	167
Klages's antbird	Drymophila klagesi Hellmayr & Seilern, 1912	168
East Andean antbird	Drymophila caudata (Sclater, PL, 1855)	169
Streak-headed antbird	Drymophila striaticeps Chapman, 1912	170
Guianan warbling antbird	Hypocnemis cantator (Boddaert, 1783)	171
Imeri warbling antbird	Hypocnemis flavescens Sclater, PL, 1865	172
Peruvian warbling antbird	Hypocnemis peruviana Taczanowski, 1884	173
Yellow-breasted warbling antbird	Hypocnemis subflava Cabanis, 1873	174
Rondonia warbling antbird	Hypocnemis ochrogyna Zimmer, JT, 1932	175
Spix's warbling antbird	Hypocnemis striata (Spix, 1825)	176
Manicore warbling antbird	Hypocnemis rondoni Whitney, Isler, ML, Bravo, Aristizábal, Schunck, Silveira, Piacentini, Cohn-Haft & Rêgo, MA, 2013	177
Yellow-browed antbird	Hypocnemis hypoxantha Sclater, PL, 1869	178
Southern chestnut-tailed antbird	Sciaphylax hemimelaena (Sclater, PL, 1857)	179
Northern chestnut-tailed antbird	Sciaphylax castanea (Zimmer, JT, 1932)	180
Willis's antbird	Cercomacroides laeta (Todd, 1920)	181
Parker's antbird	Cercomacroides parkeri (Graves, GR, 1997)	182
Blackish antbird	Cercomacroides nigrescens (Cabanis & Heine, 1860)	183
Riparian antbird	Cercomacroides fuscicauda (Zimmer, JT, 1931)	184
Dusky antbird	Cercomacroides tyrannina (Sclater, PL, 1855)	185
Black antbird	Cercomacroides serva (Sclater, PL, 1858)	186
Manu antbird	Cercomacra manu Fitzpatrick & Willard, 1990	187
Rio de Janeiro antbird	Cercomacra brasiliana Hellmayr, 1905	188
Grey antbird	Cercomacra cinerascens (Sclater, PL, 1857)	189
Mato Grosso antbird	Cercomacra melanaria (Ménétriés, 1835)	190
Bananal antbird	Cercomacra ferdinandi Snethlage, E, 1928	191
Jet antbird	Cercomacra nigricans Sclater, PL, 1858	192
Rio Branco antbird	Cercomacra carbonaria Sclater, PL & Salvin, 1873	193
Ferruginous-backed antbird	Myrmoderus ferrugineus (Müller, PLS, 1776)	194
Cordillera Azul antbird	Myrmoderus eowilsoni Moncrieff, Johnson, O, Lane, Beck, Angulo & Fagan, 2017	195
Scalloped antbird	Myrmoderus ruficauda (Wied-Neuwied, M, 1831)	196
White-bibbed antbird	Myrmoderus loricatus (Lichtenstein, MHC, 1823)	197
Squamate antbird	Myrmoderus squamosus (Pelzeln, 1868)	198
Black-chinned antbird	Hypocnemoides melanopogon (Sclater, PL, 1857)	199
Band-tailed antbird	Hypocnemoides maculicauda (Pelzeln, 1868)	200
Spotted antbird	Hylophylax naevioides (Lafresnaye, 1847)	201
Spot-backed antbird	Hylophylax naevius (Gmelin, JF, 1789)	202
Dot-backed antbird	Hylophylax punctulatus (des Murs, 1856)	203
Silvered antbird	Sclateria naevia (Gmelin, JF, 1788)	204
Plumbeous antbird	Myrmelastes hyperythrus (Sclater, PL, 1855)	205
Slate-colored antbird	Myrmelastes schistaceus (Sclater, PL, 1858)	206
Spot-winged antbird	Myrmelastes leucostigma (Pelzeln, 1868)	207
Humaita antbird	Myrmelastes humaythae (Hellmayr, 1907)	208
Brownish-headed antbird	Myrmelastes brunneiceps (Zimmer, JT, 1931)	209
Rufous-faced antbird	Myrmelastes rufifacies (Hellmayr, 1929)	210
Roraiman antbird	Myrmelastes saturatus (Salvin, 1885)	211
Caura antbird	Myrmelastes caurensis (Hellmayr, 1906)	212
Chestnut-backed antbird	Poliocrania exsul (Sclater, PL, 1859)	213
Grey-headed antbird	Ampelornis griseiceps (Chapman, 1923)	214
Stub-tailed antbird	Sipia berlepschi (Hartert, EJO, 1898)	215
Esmeraldas antbird	Sipia nigricauda (Salvin & Godman, 1892)	216
Magdalena antbird	Sipia palliata (Todd, 1917)	217
Dull-mantled antbird	Sipia laemosticta (Salvin, 1865)	218
White-bellied antbird	Myrmeciza longipes (Swainson, 1825)	219
Black-tailed antbird	Myrmoborus melanurus (Sclater, PL & Salvin, 1866)	220
White-lined antbird	Myrmoborus lophotes (Hellmayr & Seilern, 1914)	221
Black-faced antbird	Myrmoborus myotherinus (Spix, 1825)	222
White-browed antbird	Myrmoborus leucophrys (Tschudi, 1844)	223
Ash-breasted antbird	Myrmoborus lugubris (Cabanis, 1847)	224
Bare-crowned antbird	Gymnocichla nudiceps (Cassin, 1850)	225
Western fire-eye	Pyriglena maura (Ménétriés, 1835)	226
Tapajos fire-eye	Pyriglena similis Zimmer, JT, 1931	227
East Amazonian fire-eye	Pyriglena leuconota (Spix, 1824)	228
Fringe-backed fire-eye	Pyriglena atra (Swainson, 1825)	229
White-shouldered fire-eye	Pyriglena leucoptera (Vieillot, 1818)	230
Slender antbird	Rhopornis ardesiacus (Wied-Neuwied, M, 1831)	231
Black-headed antbird	Percnostola rufifrons (Gmelin, JF, 1789)	232
Allpahuayo antbird	Percnostola arenarum Isler, ML, Álvarez A, J, Isler, PR & Whitney, 2001	233
White-shouldered antbird	Akletos melanoceps (Spix, 1825)	234
Goeldi's antbird	Akletos goeldii (Snethlage, E, 1908)	235
Sooty antbird	Hafferia fortis (Sclater, PL & Salvin, 1868)	236
Blue-lored antbird	Hafferia immaculata (Lafresnaye, 1845)	237
Zeledon's antbird	Hafferia zeledoni (Ridgway, 1909)	238
