= Rufous-winged antwren =

The rufous-winged antwren has been split into two species:

- Rufous-margined antwren, Herpsilochmus rufimarginatus
- Rusty-winged antwren, Herpsilochmus frater
