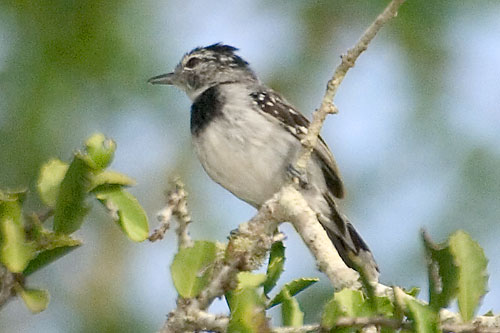
- Pectoral antwren (Herpsilochmus pectoralis)

Scientific classification
- Kingdom: Animalia
- Phylum: Chordata
- Class: Aves
- Order: Passeriformes
- Family: Thamnophilidae
- Genus: Herpsilochmus; Cabanis, 1847

Type species
- Myoithera pileata Lichtenstein, 1823

= Herpsilochmus =

Genus of birds

Herpsilochmus is a genus of insectivorous passerine birds in the antbird family (Thamnophilidae). They are found in forest, woodland and shrub in South America, although a single species the rufous-winged antwren (H. rufimarginatus) also occurs in Panama. All are relatively small antbirds that are sexually dichromatic. In most (but not all) species males are essentially light grey with a black crown and black-and-white wings, while females are more buff or rufous with black-and-white crown.

== Taxonomy ==
The genus Herpsilochmus was introduced in 1847 by the German ornithologist Jean Cabanis. He listed several species in his new genus but did not specify the type. In 1855 George Gray designated the type as Myiothera pileata Lichtenstein, 1823, the Bahia antwren. The name of the genus combines the Ancient Greek ἑρπω/herpō meaning "to creep about" with λοχμη/lokhmē meaning "thicket" or "copse".

The scientific history of the genus is closely associated with the German naturalist Friedrich Sellow (1789–1831), who traveled to Brazil in 1814 to collect natural history specimens. Between 1816 and 1818, Sellow sent a significant number of bird specimens to Berlin, including Myiothera pileata, which was later reclassified as Herpsilochmus pileatus. Several species currently assigned to the genus are believed to have originated from Sellow's original collections.

Herpsilochmus belongs to the family Thamnophilidae and is commonly referred to as an "antwren." Historically, the classification of the genus has relied largely on external morphological traits such as plumage coloration, body proportions, and sexual dimorphism. While this approach contributed to a relatively cohesive taxonomic structure, recent phylogenomic studies have questioned the monophyly of the genus. Analyses indicate that Herpsilochmus may not represent a single evolutionary lineage.

Notably, the Caatinga antwren (Herpsilochmus sellowi), a species endemic to Brazil and originally classified within the H. pileatus complex, has been shown to be more closely related to Biatas nigropectus, a member of a different genus, than to other Herpsilochmus species. Despite sharing some superficial morphological traits with other species in the genus, genetic evidence places the Caatinga antwren outside the main clade, suggesting a case of phenotypic convergence likely driven by similar ecological pressures. As a result of these findings, the taxonomy of Herpsilochmus is undergoing revision. Six well-supported species groups have been identified within Herpsilochmus sensu stricto, excluding the Caatinga antwren, which does not belong to the main lineage. Further taxonomic revision of the Herpsilochmus pileatus complex has revealed the presence of at least three distinct species-level taxa, rather than a single polytypic species. This led to the formal description of a new species from northeastern Brazil, characterized by consistent morphological differences and distinctive vocalizations. Species delimitation was based on clear divergence in male plumage patterns, song structure, and geographically non-overlapping ranges, rather than continuous variation across populations.

The genus contains 17 species:

| Image | Common name | Scientific name | Distribution |
|---|---|---|---|
| | Ash-throated antwren | Herpsilochmus parkeri | Mayo River (Peru) |
| | Creamy-bellied antwren | Herpsilochmus motacilloides | Peru |
| | Predicted antwren | Herpsilochmus praedictus | Juruá and Madeira interfluve |
| | Aripuana antwren | Herpsilochmus stolzi | Aripuanã River |
| | Black-capped antwren | Herpsilochmus atricapillus | Brazil, eastern Bolivia and Paraguay |
| | Bahia antwren | Herpsilochmus pileatus | Bahia coastal forests |
| | Spot-tailed antwren | Herpsilochmus sicturus | Guiana Shield |
| | Dugand's antwren | Herpsilochmus dugandi | western Amazonia |
| | Todd's antwren | Herpsilochmus stictocephalus | Guiana Shield |
| | Ancient antwren | Herpsilochmus gentryi | northern Peru |
| | Spot-backed antwren | Herpsilochmus dorsimaculatus | northern Amazonia |
| | Roraiman antwren | Herpsilochmus roraimae | tepuis |
| | Pectoral antwren | Herpsilochmus pectoralis | Caatinga |
| | Large-billed antwren | Herpsilochmus longirostris | Cerrado |
| | Yellow-breasted antwren | Herpsilochmus axillaris | northern Andes |
| | Rusty-winged antwren | Herpsilochmus frater | northern South America |
| | Rufous-margined antwren | Herpsilochmus rufimarginatus | southern Atlantic Forest and Selva Misionera |

== Description ==
Herpsilochmus is a genus of small, insectivorous passerine birds in the family Thamnophilidae. Members of this genus typically weigh between 7 and 14 grams and are characterized by their slender bodies and active foraging behavior. Males of certain species can be identified by a set of morphological traits, such as a narrow bill under 3 mm wide at the front edge of the nares, wing chords of 43–50 mm, tail lengths of 44–51 mm, and slim central rectrices that are entirely black and lack the white edges seen in related taxa. While male plumage tends to be relatively uniform across species, females show more pronounced interspecific differences in color and pattern, making female plumage particularly useful for species identification. In some species, such as H. pectoralis, females are notable for their vivid orange head coloration, which contrasts sharply with related forms. When compared to closely related taxa like the parapatric H. pileatus and sympatric H. atricapillus, certain species also display shorter, narrower bills, reduced postocular streaking, and an absence of the dark preocular spot found in those species.

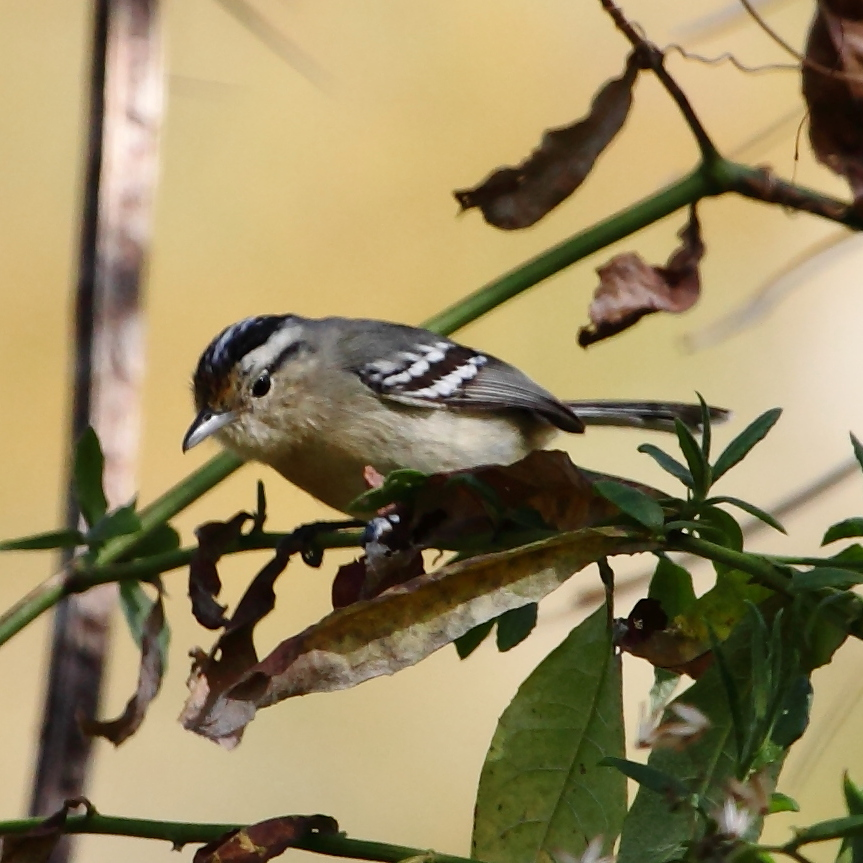
Herpsilochmus atricapillus-Black-capped Antwren (Female)

In the black-capped antwren (Herpsilochmus atricapillus), male plumage has shown significant non-clinal variation in the gray coloring of the underparts. Specimens can be grouped into gray, white, and intermediate morphs based on the appearance of the throat, breast, and belly. A clear geographical pattern exists: individuals from northeastern regions such as central Bahia and eastern Minas Gerais typically show grayish throats and upper breasts, while populations from western Bahia, northern São Paulo, Goiás, and parts of Bolivia tend to be entirely white below, often with extended white tail markings and a faint buff wash on the flanks. Female plumage also varies, especially in the intensity of buff coloration on the underparts, though this is thought to reflect individual variation rather than subspecific differences. A morphometric comparison using one-way ANOVA found no significant difference in body size or weight between male morphs, though males had significantly longer wing chords than females (P < 0.005).

=== Vocalizations ===
Vocalizations are key traits for distinguishing members of the Herpsilochmus pileatus complex. The song of H. pileatus begins with a short sequence of four to seven notes that become progressively closer together, followed by a series of evenly spaced notes that retain a consistent tone and shape. The dominant frequency is around 2 kHz, with only minor shifts in pitch and amplitude.

By contrast, the song of the black-capped antwren (H. atricapillus) opens with one to three distinct introductory notes, differing in structure and frequency from the main sequence. These notes are separated by wider intervals and show variation in duration. A distinct rattling call, often associated with predator alarm, is a notable part of the vocal repertoire; it is marked by strong harmonic overtones in spectrograms, an acoustic signature not observed in related species . Another commonly heard vocalization is a soft, modulated “greep” repeated irregularly. This call is frequently used in pair communication, especially during short-distance flights or alert behaviors. These vocal distinctions, especially differences in rhythm, note structure, and modulation, have proven essential in supporting the recognition of multiple species within the pileatus complex.

== Distribution and habitat ==
Species of the genus Herpsilochmus are broadly distributed across the Neotropics, occurring from southern Central America to the lowland and subtropical regions of the Andes, as well as throughout the Guianas and the Amazon Basin. They occupy a wide range of habitats, including lowland tropical rainforests, seasonally dry woodlands, and various open or xeric formations such as restinga, caatinga, and cerrado. Many species are most commonly associated with the midstory and canopy strata of terra firme forests in the Amazon, although others are adapted to drier and more fragmented landscapes.

The spot-backed antwren (Herpsilochmus dorsimaculatus), for example, is known from the canopy and subcanopy of primary terra firme forests and white-sand vegetation (campinarana) in northwestern Amazonia, and has also been recorded in seasonally flooded forests in Venezuela. In contrast, the pectoral antwren (H. pectoralis) is endemic to northeastern Brazil and is typically found in fragmented coastal forests and dry ecosystems such as caatinga and restinga. Field surveys conducted in Rio Grande do Norte have shown that this species is particularly abundant in structurally complex forest fragments, including semideciduous forests and anthropogenically altered wooded restinga. The distribution patterns within the Herpsilochmus pileatus species complex reveal a clear case of allopatric replacement across eastern Brazil. H. pileatus sensu stricto is primarily confined to coastal regions of Bahia and adjacent areas, while H. atricapillus occupies inland and more southerly zones. A newly described taxon within the complex occurs in the northernmost part of the range, suggesting a history of parapatric or allopatric divergence likely shaped by ecological gradients. The boundaries between these taxa align with major biome transitions, particularly among the Atlantic Forest, cerrado, and caatinga regions.

== Behavior ==
Most species of Herpsilochmus forage primarily in the midstory and upper layers of forests or scrublands, though in areas with dense, low vegetation, they may descend to feed in shrubs less than two meters above the ground. Their foraging behavior typically consists of short, near-perch movements, including reaching and gleaning techniques. Unlike some other antbirds, they rarely engage in hanging maneuvers. These birds frequently ascend through vine tangles and dense foliage, actively inspecting both leaves and bark in search of arthropod prey, but they tend to ignore dead leaves. Pairs often forage in close proximity, generally within five meters of each other, although they may occasionally become separated by several trees. During foraging, individuals remain in near-constant motion, displaying subtle and shallow flicks of the wings and tail. These movements, while characteristic, are not species-specific, and the tail is typically held below a 30-degree angle relative to the back unless the bird is alarmed or interacting with other species. Diet consists mainly of arthropods, including members of Orthoptera (grasshoppers), Hemiptera (true bugs), and Coleoptera (notably Curculionidae, or weevils), among others. In northeastern Brazil, Herpsilochmus pectoralis has been observed participating in mixed-species foraging flocks alongside species such as H. atricapillus, Formicivora grisea, and Thamnophilus pelzelni. These associations may offer ecological advantages, such as enhanced predator detection or increased foraging efficiency, particularly in fragmented or disturbed habitats.

=== Breeding ===
Available information on the nesting behavior of Herpsilochmus species indicates a broadly consistent pattern across the genus. Most species construct small, open cup-shaped nests, typically situated in the forks of slender branches at heights ranging from approximately 1 to 3.6 meters above ground. These nests are generally composed of lightweight plant materials, such as fine roots, grass blades, leaf fragments, and fungal threads, particularly Marasmius hyphae—with occasional additions of moss or lichen. A distinctive feature of many nests is their thin, semi-transparent walls, which often allow partial visibility of the nest interior, a construction style common across Thamnophilidae.

For the spot-backed antwren, one nest was documented in a fragment of terra firme forest near Manaus, Brazil. It was built in the fork of a fallen tree and composed of interwoven roots, fibers, moss, and dry leaf fragments. In a separate observation in the Adolfo Ducke Forest Reserve in Amazonas, Brazil, researchers found a nest in a Lacunaria tree 3.5 meters above the ground. Although the tree had recently collapsed, possibly due to heavy rains, the nest remained intact and appeared recently constructed. A fully-fledged chick with plumage similar to an adult male was observed nearby being fed by an adult, supporting the nest's identification as belonging to the spot-backed antwren.

The large-billed antwren has also been observed nesting in open shrubs, usually at heights between 1.4 and 1.8 meters. Its nests are made of grass stems, palm fibers, and spider silk, suspended between twigs to form delicate cup-shaped structures. These nests are generally located in microhabitats that offer concealment and lower predation risk. In the coastal forests of Rio Grande do Norte, Brazil, the pectoral antwren has been recorded building cup-shaped nests in low vegetation, typically between 0.8 and 1.3 meters above ground. These nests were suspended in horizontal forks and constructed using dry grasses, plant fibers, and fungal hyphae—again, mainly from Marasmius species. The nests displayed thin, translucent walls and a fragile, camouflaged appearance—features that may provide adaptive advantages in open or wind-exposed restinga and semi-deciduous forest patches. Clutch size across the genus appears to be consistently two eggs, in accordance with patterns seen in other tropical antbirds. Eggs of the pectoral antwren are usually beige or pinkish with brown blotches concentrated at the larger pole. Although detailed data are limited, field observations indicate biparental nest defense. Vocal exchanges near nests suggest coordinated incubation shifts, though egg turning has primarily been observed in females; this division of labor requires further study to be confirmed.

== Dispersal ==
Although species within the genus Herpsilochmus are often regarded as habitat specialists with limited dispersal abilities, recent records suggest that some taxa may exhibit greater ecological flexibility than previously assumed. Herpsilochmus longirostris, typically associated with dry forests and savannas in central Brazil and eastern Bolivia, has been documented well beyond its known range. One notable record comes from the coastal municipality of Itanhaém in São Paulo State—over 200 kilometers east of its established distribution. This observation represents a significant extralimital occurrence across multiple biogeographic barriers, including the Serra do Mar and the Atlantic Forest, suggesting a capacity for long-distance dispersal.

Additional records from Bolivia indicate that the large-billed antwren is expanding into adjacent Amazonian habitats, including gallery forests and terra firme areas in the departments of Pando and La Paz. These findings support the idea that at least some members of the genus are capable of utilizing ecological corridors and colonizing new environments opportunistically, even when traditionally considered forest specialists. These patterns have broader implications for understanding the dispersal of Neotropical insectivorous birds. First, they challenge the assumption that small forest insectivores have an inherently low dispersal capacity. Second, they raise the possibility that Herpsilochmus species may explore or colonize new habitats in response to environmental change. Factors such as climate change, habitat fragmentation, and anthropogenic disturbance may increasingly influence the migration and distribution dynamics of these birds, as has been observed in other Neotropical forest taxa.

== Conservation ==
Conservation concerns for species within the genus Herpsilochmus largely arise from their limited geographic ranges, habitat specialization, and the ongoing degradation of Neotropical forests. Several taxa are endemic to ecosystems that are both ecologically unique and under severe threat, including the Atlantic Forest, Caatinga, and white-sand forests of Amazonia. One such species, Herpsilochmus pectoralis, is currently classified as Vulnerable due to its restricted distribution and declining habitat quality. A systematic survey conducted at 33 sites across northeastern Brazil estimated the total population of H. pectoralis at approximately 13,921 individuals. The species’ viable habitat was assessed at 504.7 km^{2}, yet only 2% of this area falls within strictly protected conservation units, such as the Dunas State Park of Natal. The remainder is subject to ongoing pressures from agricultural expansion, urban development, and other forms of habitat conversion, particularly in northeastern Brazil where forest fragmentation is extensive. Given the species' apparent low dispersal capacity, continued habitat loss poses a significant risk to population viability.

Taxonomic research has further highlighted the conservation urgency within the genus. The description of new species and the revision of established complexes, such as the recognition of the Caatinga antwren as a distinct taxon separate from the H. pileatus complex, underscore the potential presence of additional cryptic or range-restricted species that have yet to be formally identified. These revisions are particularly important for conservation planning, as previously lumped taxa may have been more widespread in concept than they are in reality. Narrowly distributed species, once recognized as distinct, often face greater conservation threats than previously assumed. Accurate taxonomic resolution is therefore essential to properly assess species distributions, population sizes, and threat levels. The refinement of species limits allows for more targeted conservation strategies, particularly for those taxa confined to fragmented or declining habitats. Furthermore, environmental change, driven by climate shifts or anthropogenic disturbance, may compound these threats and alter existing distribution patterns.
