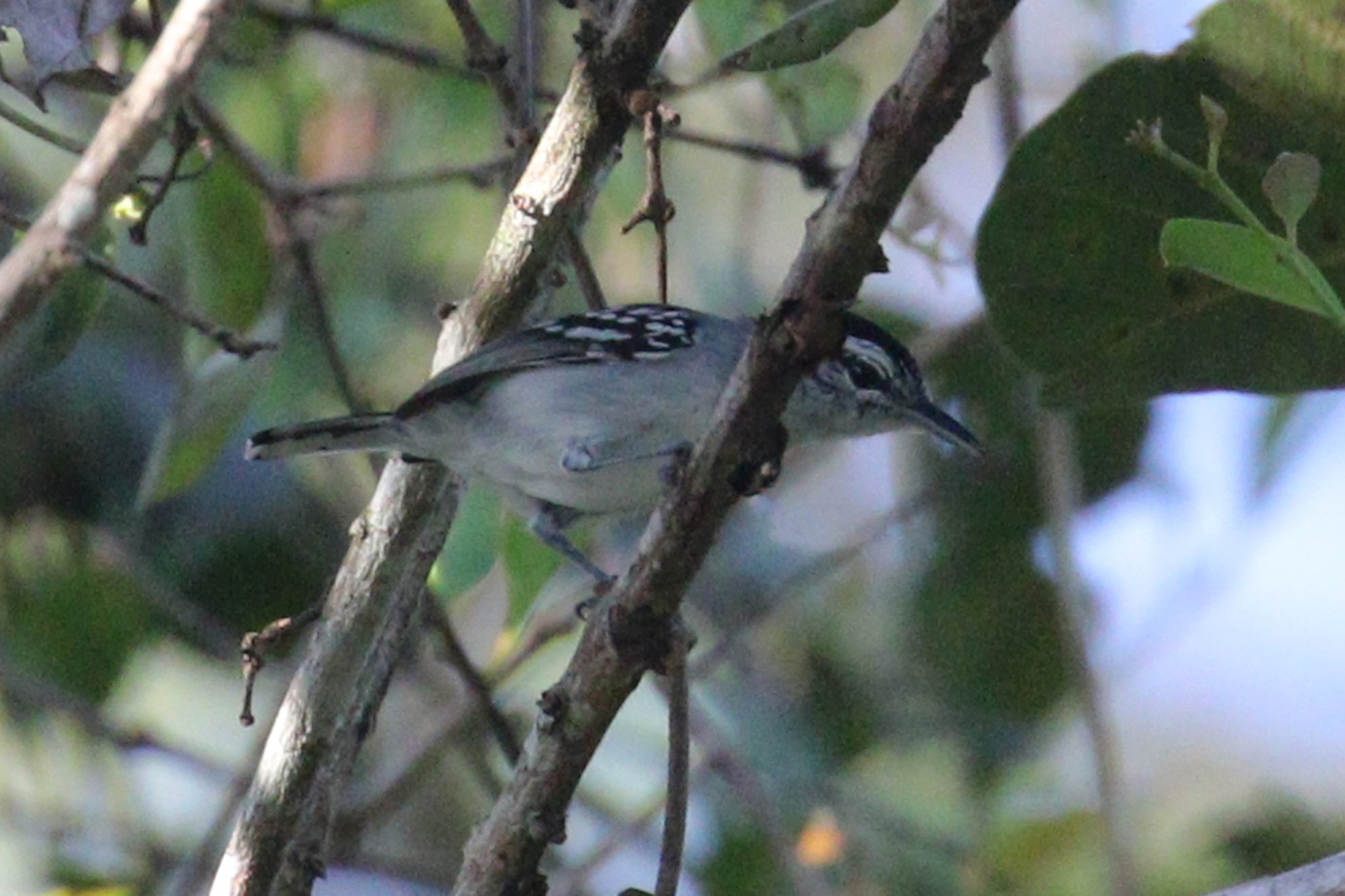

Conservation status
- Least Concern (IUCN 3.1)

Scientific classification
- Kingdom: Animalia
- Phylum: Chordata
- Class: Aves
- Order: Passeriformes
- Family: Thamnophilidae
- Genus: Herpsilochmus
- Species: H. stictocephalus

Binomial name
- Herpsilochmus stictocephalus Todd, 1927

= Todd's antwren =

Species of bird

Todd's antwren (Herpsilochmus stictocephalus) is a species of bird in subfamily Thamnophilinae of family Thamnophilidae, the "typical antbirds". It is found in Brazil, French Guiana, Guyana, Suriname, and Venezuela.

== Taxonomy and systematics ==
Todd's antwren is monotypic. It appears to form a superspecies with the ancient antwren (H. gentryi).

== Description ==
Todd's antwren is 10 to 11 cm (3.9 to 4.3 in) long and weighs 8 to 9.5 g (0.28 to 0.34 oz). Adult males have a black forehead with short white streaks, a black crown and nape, a long white supercilium, and a black streak behind the eye. Their back and rump are light gray with small black patches, white-edged black scapulars, and a white patch between the scapulars. Their wings are black with white tips on the coverts and white edges on the flight feathers. Their tail is black; the feathers have white tips, white spots and a white streak on the central ones, and white edges on the outer ones. Their throat is white and their underparts pale gray with slightly darker sides. Adult females have a buff tinge on their forehead, a black crown with white spots, and light buff breast and sides. Their wings and tail are like the male's. The species is very similar to the spot-tailed antwren (H. sticturus), differing mostly in female plumage and song.

== Distribution and habitat ==
The spot-tailed antwren is found from eastern Venezuela's Bolívar state east through the Guianas into northeastern Brazil's Pará and Amapá states. It inhabits the subcanopy and canopy of humid evergreen forest in the lowlands and foothills. It favors areas of tall forest on rich soil and almost never occurs in forested savanna or seasonally flooded forest. In elevation, it ranges from sea level to 700 m (2,300 ft). Its range overlaps that of the spot-tailed antwren, whose preferred habitat is somewhat different.

== Behavior ==
=== Movement ===
Todd's antwren is thought to be a year-round resident throughout its range.

=== Feeding ===
The diet of Todd's antwren has not been detailed but is known to be mostly arthropods. It forages singly, in pairs, and in family groups, and often as a member of a mixed-species feeding flock. It typically feeds between 20 and 40 m (65 and 130 ft) above the ground, at the ends of leafy branches, in the crown of trees, and in vine tangles. It forages actively but methodically and usually captures prey by gleaning leaves, stems, and vines by reaching from a perch. It is not known to follow army ants.

=== Breeding ===
Nothing is known about the breeding biology of Todd's antwren.

=== Vocalization ===
The song of Todd's antwren is a "short, high, rapid series of about 12 notes, which descend and slow down at the end". Its calls include an "abrupt, downslurred 'tup' and even more abrupt, vibrant 'chit' ". Its song is the easiest way to separate it from the spot-tailed antwren, as both are hard to see in the forest canopy.

== Status ==
The IUCN has assessed Todd's antwren as being of Least Concern. It has a large range and an unknown population size that is believed to be decreasing. No immediate threats have been identified. It is not well known but is considered uncommon across its range. Some protected areas are in its range, and "also extensive areas of intact habitat which, while not formally protected, appear to be at little risk of development in near future". However, it is believed to be "highly sensitive to human disturbance".
