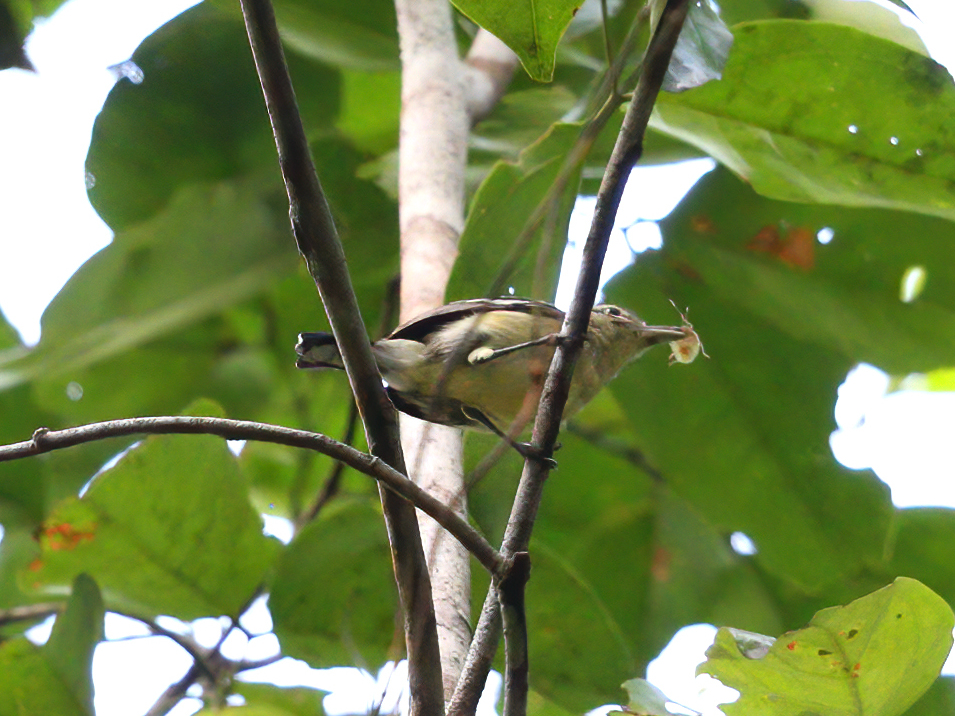

Conservation status
- Least Concern (IUCN 3.1)

Scientific classification
- Kingdom: Animalia
- Phylum: Chordata
- Class: Aves
- Order: Passeriformes
- Family: Thamnophilidae
- Genus: Herpsilochmus
- Species: H. gentryi

Binomial name
- Herpsilochmus gentryi Whitney & Álvarez A, J, 1998

= Ancient antwren =

Species of bird

The ancient antwren (Herpsilochmus gentryi) is a species of tropical bird in the family Thamnophilidae. It is primarily found in terra firme forests of northern Peru and southeastern Ecuador. This species was described in 1998 and named after the American botanist Alwyn Gentry. Habitat loss poses the greatest threat to this species.

== Taxonomy and systematics ==
The ancient antwren was described in 1998 by Bret M. Whitney and Jose Alvarez Alonso. The holotype was collected along the Rio Tigre in the Department of Loreto, Peru. The specific epithet gentryi honors the American botanist Alwyn Gentry. It is closely related to the Todd's antwren, to which it may be a sister species. This species is monotypic, with no known subspecies.

== Description ==
The ancient antwren is small passerine, with a total length of 10-11 centimeters (4 in) and weight of 10.2-11 grams. Sexual dimorphism is present in this species, but not as apparent when compared to other members of this genus. Adult males have solid black crowns with a bold yellowish supercilium, dark gray upperparts and rump, and yellowish throat and underparts. Females and subadults display whitish or yellow spots on the crown and generally have darker olive breasts and sides than adult males. The scapulars and coverts of this species are black tipped with white in all plumages, and the wings are overall short. The tail is short and graduated, with black rectrices outlined in white.

Its closest relative, Todd's antwren (H. stictocephalus), does not overlap in range. It is sympatric with another member of Herpsilochmus, Dugand's antwren, but there is limited habitat overlap with this species. Ancient antwren can be distinguished from this species by its brighter yellow or olive underparts and lack of any rufous on the head or breast.

== Distribution and habitat ==
This species is restricted to humid terra firme forest in north-central Peru and southeastern Ecuador within the Amazon basin. In Peru, appears to be restricted to two types of terra firme forest; varrilal, a stunted forest type characterized by white sands, and irapayal, an open-canopy forest with an understory dominated by palms. In Ecuador, it is found in terra firme forest on the highest and driest ridgetops. The ancient antwren appears to prefer patchy habitats with high-contrast edges. It is found at elevations up to 200 meters. Like others in its genus, this species occupies the canopy and sub-canopy. This species is considered a sedentary resident, with no documentation of migration or movement.

== Behavior and ecology ==
=== Breeding ===
Little is known about the breeding habits of this species. The breeding season is believed to be early in the year, from January to March, based on skull ossification of juvenile birds and sightings of family groups in April.

=== Feeding and foraging ===
The ancient antwren forages high in canopy or sub-canopy, where it gleans prey from leaves and branches. Diet is poorly known, but feeds on insects, likely spiders and lepidopteran larvae. Foraging behavior has been described as active, with interspersed wing flutters and short hops. This species has been documented to forage in mixed flocks with other canopy-dwelling birds, as well as in small family groups or mated pairs.

=== Vocalization ===
The ancient antwren's song is described as a long decelerating series of notes that rises slightly in frequency, then decreases. This song is distinct from other members of this genus save for Todd's antwren. The calls of ancient antwren have been described as short "chups", longer "tink" calls, and rattle-like calls, and can be distinguished from other Herpsilochmus species by tonality and note structure.

== Status and threats ==
The ancient antwren is currently ranked as being of Least Concern by the IUCN in 2017. Due to its relatively recent discovery, the population trends of this species are poorly understood. It is relatively common in its preferred habitat in Peru and rare and local in Ecuador. Mining and oil exploration pose the greatest threats to this species through habitat loss or degradation, especially as its preferred habitat is naturally uncommon within Amazonia.
