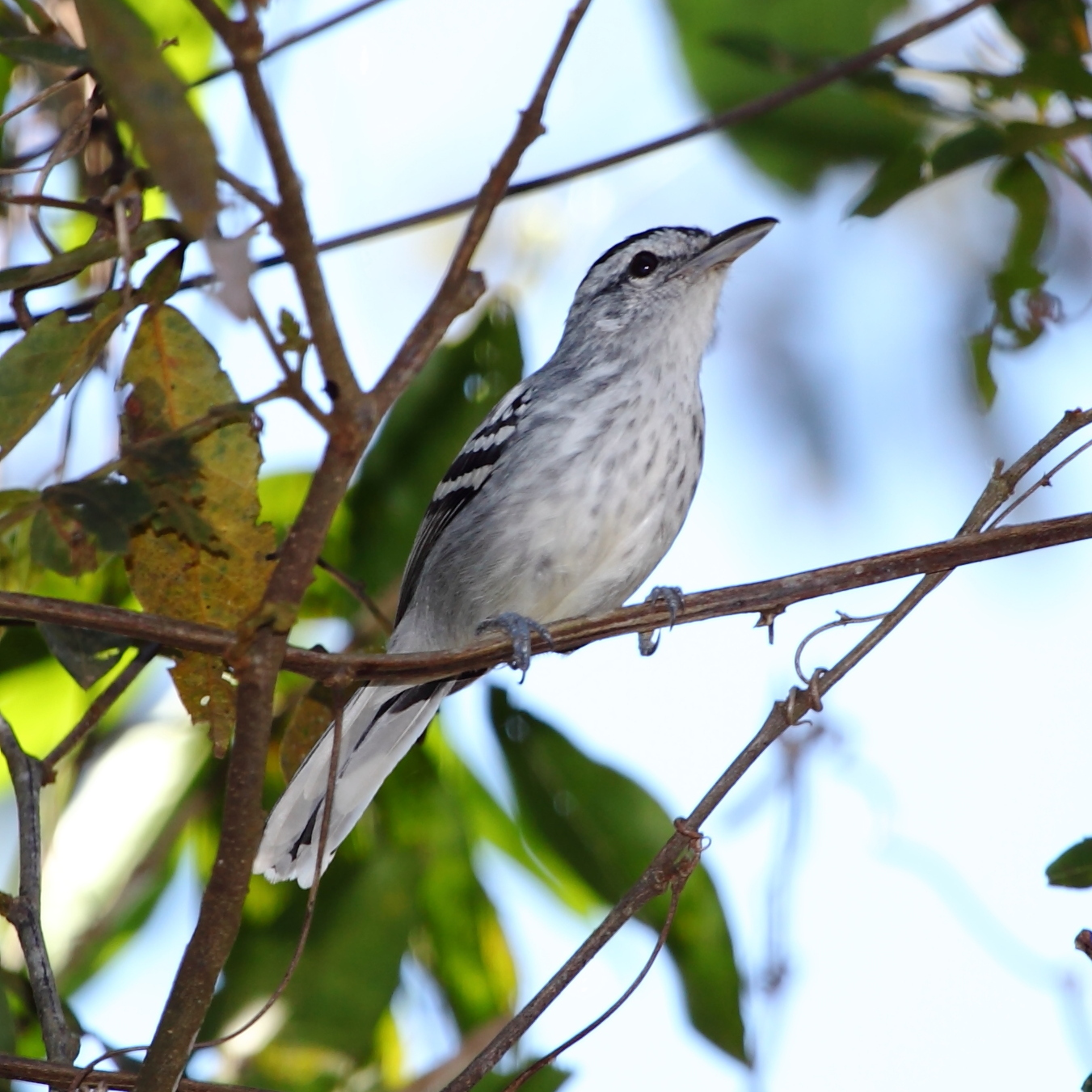
- Male at Dourado, São Paulo State, Brazil
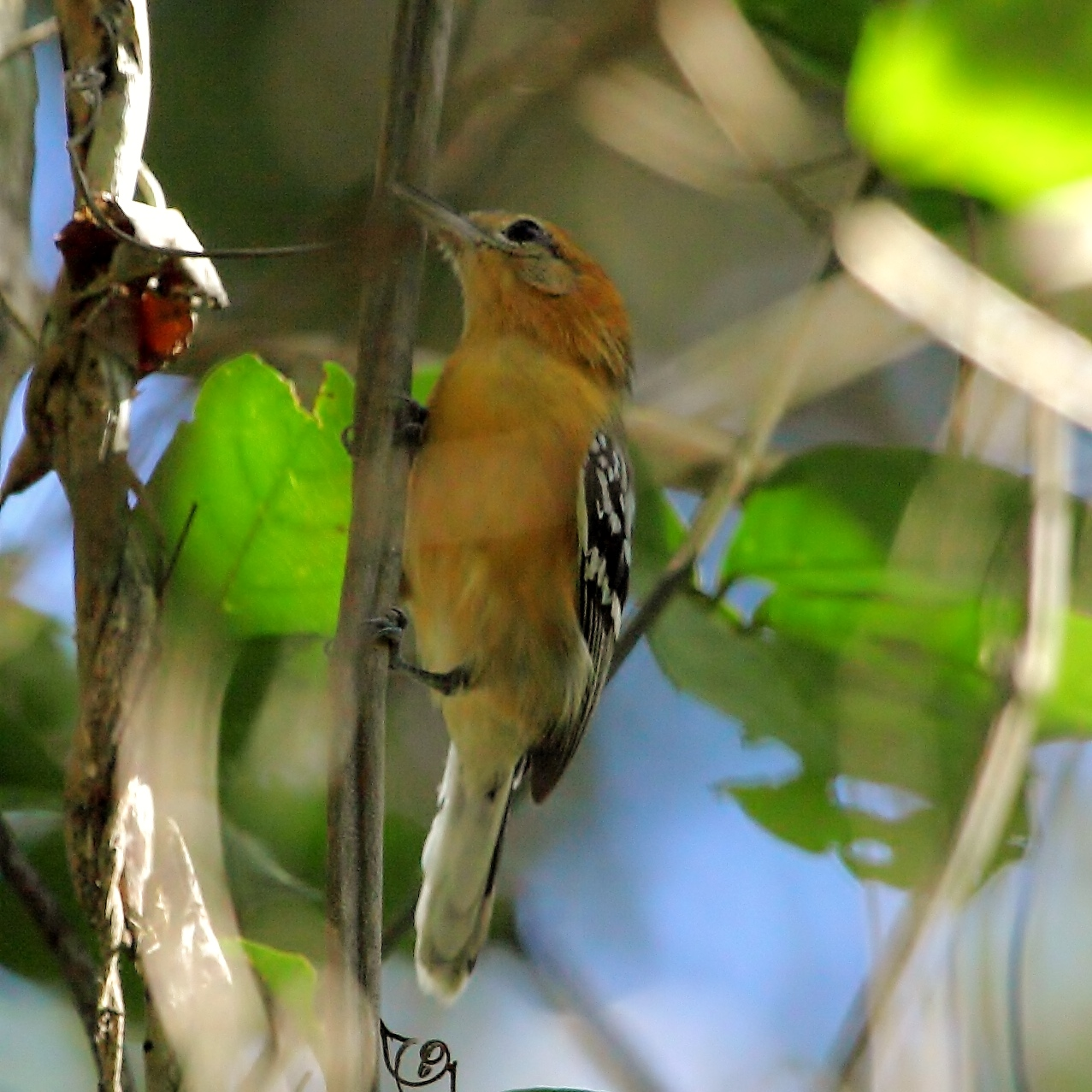
- Female at Poconé, Mato Grosso State, Brazil

Conservation status
- Least Concern (IUCN 3.1)

Scientific classification
- Kingdom: Animalia
- Phylum: Chordata
- Class: Aves
- Order: Passeriformes
- Family: Thamnophilidae
- Genus: Herpsilochmus
- Species: H. longirostris

Binomial name
- Herpsilochmus longirostris Pelzeln, 1868

= Large-billed antwren =

Species of bird

The large-billed antwren (Herpsilochmus longirostris) is a species of bird in subfamily Thamnophilinae of family Thamnophilidae, the "typical antbirds". It is found in Bolivia and Brazil.

== Taxonomy and systematics ==
The large-billed antwren was described by the Austrian ornithologist August von Pelzeln in 1868 and given its current binomial name Herpsilochmus longirostris. Its relationship to others of its genus is unclear but it apparently is most closely related to the pectoral antwren (H. pectoralis), and at least one author has considered them to form a superspecies.

The large-billed antwren is monotypic.

== Description ==
The large-billed antwren is 12 to 13 cm (4.7 to 5.1 in) long and weighs 12 to 14 g (0.42 to 0.49 oz). As its English name and specific epithet imply, its bill is heavier than those of most other Herpsilochmus antwrens. Adult males have a black crown and nape, a long whitish supercilium, a narrow black streak through the eye, and grayish ear coverts. Their back and rump are gray with a black and white patch between the scapulars and white-tipped black uppertail coverts. Their wings are black with white-tipped coverts and flight feathers with white edges towards the end. Their innermost tail feathers are black with white edges, the outermost entirely white, and those in between black with white tips. Their throat and underparts are mostly white with tiny black spots on the sides of the breast and grayish sides and flanks. Adult females have a rufous-cinnamon crown, cinnamon-tinged gray ear coverts and upperparts, and cinnamon neck, throat, and underparts. Their wings and tail are like the male's.

== Distribution and habitat ==
The large-billed antwren is found south of most of Amazonia. It occurs in the northern parts of Bolivia's Beni and Santa Cruz departments and in south-central to northeastern Brazil. Its Brazilian range is roughly bounded by the states of Mato Grosso, Tocantins, and Paraná though it is found locally as far northeast as southern Ceará and Piauí. It inhabits deciduous and semi-deciduous forest, gallery forest, and palm groves, and does not favor any particular level of the forest. In Bolivia it also often inhabits small patches of forest in otherwise open cerrado. In elevation it ranges from about 150 to 1,100 m (500 to 3,600 ft).

== Behavior ==
=== Movement ===
The large-billed antwren is thought to be a year-round resident throughout its range.

=== Feeding ===
The large-billed antwren's diet has not been detailed but includes insects and probably spiders. It forages singly, in pairs, and in family groups, and often as a member of a mixed-species feeding flock. It typically feeds between 1.5 and 10 m (5 and 35 ft) above the ground and sometimes as high as 15 m (50 ft). It forages actively and methodically, and usually captures prey by gleaning from leaves, stems, and vines by reaching and sometimes lunging from a perch. It also makes short sallies to access leaves and occasionally takes prey from atop leaf litter on the ground. It is not known to follow army ants.

=== Breeding ===
The large-billed antwren's breeding season has not been fully defined but appears to span September to December in western Brazil. One nest was a small cup made of leaves, fungal filaments, and plant fibers placed 1.5 m (5 ft) above the ground in a small tree. Nothing else is known about the species' breeding biology.

=== Vocalization ===
The large-billed antwren's song is a "high, fast, chattering series, rising at start, descending and decelerating at end". Typically the male sings and the female quickly answers. Its calls include a "a rapidly delivered triplet in which notes become shorter and drop in pitch" and an "abrupt downslurred note" like that of several other members of its genus.

== Status ==
The IUCN has assessed the large-billed antwren as being of Least Concern. It has a large range and an unknown population size that is believed to be decreasing. No immediate threats have been identified. It is considered uncommon to fairly common in much of its range and is common along the Transpantaneira in the Pantanal of Mato Grosso. Its range includes several large protected areas in both countries. It is thought to be "of medium sensitivity to human disturbance".
