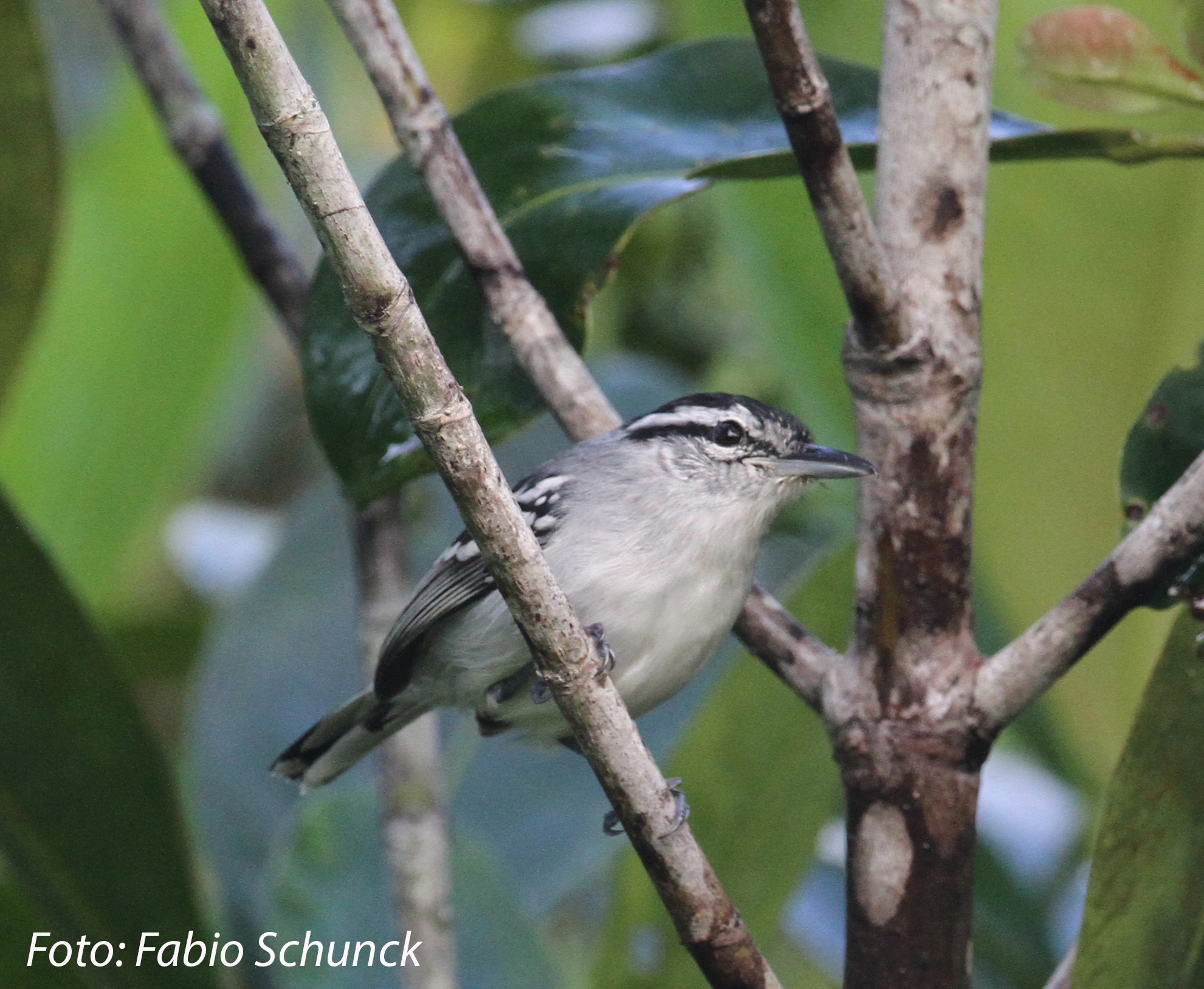

Conservation status
- Least Concern (IUCN 3.1)

Scientific classification
- Kingdom: Animalia
- Phylum: Chordata
- Class: Aves
- Order: Passeriformes
- Family: Thamnophilidae
- Genus: Herpsilochmus
- Species: H. stotzi

Binomial name
- Herpsilochmus stotzi Whitney et al., 2013
- Distribution map of Aripuana antwren

= Aripuana antwren =

Species of bird in Brazil

The Aripuana antwren (Herpsilochmus stotzi) is an insectivorous bird in subfamily Thamnophilinae of family Thamnophilidae, the "typical antbirds". It is endemic to central Amazonian Brazil.

== Taxonomy and systematics ==
The Aripuana antwren was first discovered in 1986 and at the time was thought to be a subpopulation of the black-capped antwren (H. atriacapillus). It was recognized as a species and so described in 2013 and recognition by regional and worldwide taxonomic systems followed. Its specific epithet honors the discoverer Douglas Stotz.

The Aripuana antwren is monotypic.

== Description ==
The Aripuana antwren is 11 to 12 cm (4.3 to 4.7 in) long and weighs about 11 g (0.39 oz). Adult males have a black crown and nape, a long whitish supercilium, and a black streak through the eye. The rest of their upperparts are gray. Their wings are black with white tips on the coverts and white edges on the flight feathers. Their tail is black with large white feather tips and white edges on the outermost. Their throat is pale creamy white and their breast and belly whitish. Adult females have an orangish forehead and a black crown with white streaks. Their upperparts are gray. Their throat is a creamier white than the male's and the rest of their underparts are whiter than the male's.

== Distribution and habitat ==
The Aripuana antwren was first described from the area between the rios Aripuanã and Machado (the interfluvium) in Rondônia. It is now known somewhat more widely along the right bank of the Rio Madeira and along the Rio Roosevelt in more of Rondônia, southeastern Amazonas, and northwestern Mato Grosso. It primarily inhabits old-growth campinarana forest on nutrient-poor soil. The trees seldom exceed 20 m (66 ft) in height. It also occurs in tall undisturbed terra firme where it favors areas with Lepidocaryum tenue palms.

== Behavior ==
=== Movement ===
The Aripuana antwren is believed to be a year-round resident throughout its range.

=== Feeding ===
The Aripuana antwren's diet is known only from the stomach contents of specimens, which were the remains of insects and spiders. It forages singly, in pairs, and in family groups and frequently as a member of a mixed-species feeding flock. It mostly forages in the canopy by gleaning prey from vegetation.

=== Breeding ===
The Aripuana antwren is believed to nest in July and August but nothing else is known about its breeding biology.

=== Vocalization ===
The Aripuana antwren's song is a "soft, purring, rolling trill that decelerates strongly throughout". The song is part of the evidence for its treatment as a species, as it lacks distinct notes before the trill that visually similar others of its genus have, and the trill has a different pace from theirs. Its most often heard call is a "tchwee" and it also utters "a very short, sharp 'chew'" singly or in series.

== Status ==
The IUCN has assessed the Aripuana antwren as being of Least Concern. It has a smallish range and an unknown population size that is believed to be decreasing. "Much habitat within the range current[ly] remains intact, however the 'Transamazonica' federal highway BR-230 dissects the distribution of the species and is undoubtedly opening up additional areas to deforestation through conversion to agriculture." It is considered fairly common to common. "Although part of the species' range is already nominally protected within the newly gazetted Campos Amazônicos National Park and some of the rest lie within indigenous territories, further protected areas should be declared".
