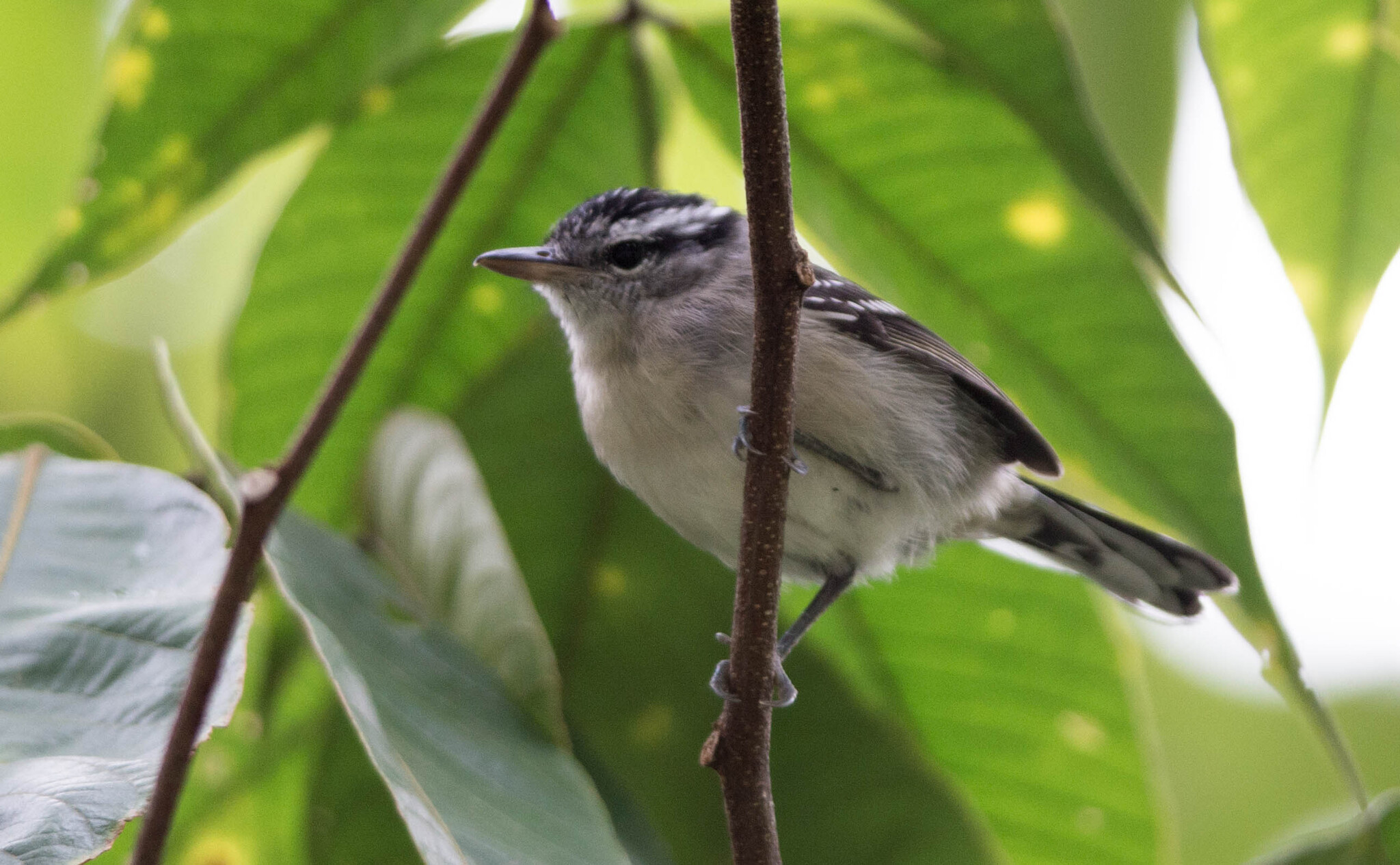

Conservation status
- Least Concern (IUCN 3.1)

Scientific classification
- Kingdom: Animalia
- Phylum: Chordata
- Class: Aves
- Order: Passeriformes
- Family: Thamnophilidae
- Genus: Herpsilochmus
- Species: H. roraimae

Binomial name
- Herpsilochmus roraimae Hellmayr, 1903

= Roraiman antwren =

Species of bird

The Roraiman antwren (Herpsilochmus roraimae) is an insectivorous bird in subfamily Thamnophilinae of family Thamnophilidae, the "typical antbirds". It is found in Brazil, Guyana, and Venezuela.

== Taxonomy and systematics ==
The Roraiman antwren was first described by the Austrian ornithologist Carl Hellmayr in 1903 with the type locality in Guyana on Mount Roraima. Its relationship to others of its genus is unclear but it apparently is most closely related to the spot-backed antwren (H. dorsimaculatus).

The Roraiman antwren has two subspecies, the nominate H. r. roraimae (Hellmayr, 1903) and H. r. kathleenae (Phelps Jr & Dickerman, 1980).

== Description ==
The Roraiman antwren is 12 to 13 cm (4.7 to 5.1 in) long and has the longest tail within genus Herpsilochmus. Adult males of the nominate subspecies have a black crown and nape, a long pale gray to white supercilium, a black streak through the eye, and grayish ear coverts. Their back and rump are dark gray with white edges on many back feathers and blackish patches. They have white-edged black scapulars and a white patch between them. Their wings are black with white-tipped coverts and flight feathers with white edges towards the end. Their tail is black with white feather tips, white spots on the central feathers, and white edges on the outer feathers. Their throat and underparts are mostly gray with a white belly center. Adult females have white spots on their crown, a buff tinge to the sides of their neck, light buff breast and sides, and smaller tail spots than males. They are otherwise like males. Males of subspecies H. r. kathleenae are like the nominate. Females have grayer upperparts and pale gray (not light buff) breast and sides.

== Distribution and habitat ==
The Roraiman antwren is a bird of the tepui region where southern Venezuela, western Guyana, and northwestern Brazil meet. The nominate subspecies is found in Venezuela's Bolívar state, extreme northern Roraima in Brazil, and west-central Guyana. Subspecies H. r. kathleenae is found in Venezuela's Bolívar and Amazonas states and extreme northern Amazonas state in Brazil. The species inhabits the subcanopy and canopy of wet evergreen forest, at lower elevations in taller trees on rich soil. It also occurs in more stunted forest towards the tops of tepuis and the ecotone between the stunted forest and the brushy savanna above it. In elevation it ranges between 700 and 2,000 m (2,300 and 6,600 ft).

== Behavior ==
=== Movement ===
The Roraiman antwren is thought to be a year-round resident throughout its range.

=== Feeding ===
The Roraiman antwren's diet has not been detailed but includes insects and probably spiders. It forages singly, in pairs, and in family groups, and often as a member of a mixed-species feeding flock. It typically feeds up 30 m (100 ft) above the ground in tall forest but as low as 3 m (10 ft) in stunted forest. It forages mostly at the ends of leafy branches and in the crown of trees. It forages actively and methodically, and usually captures prey by gleaning from leaves, stems, and vines by reaching and sometimes lunging from a perch. It sometimes makes short salllies to hover-glean. It is not known to follow army ants.

=== Breeding ===
Nothing is known about the Roraima antwren's breeding biology.

=== Vocalization ===
The Roraiman antwren's song is a "very high, loud, fast, chipping series of about 12 notes, the last 3-4 descending and decelerating". Its calls include "very abrupt 'chup' notes" that are given singly or rapidly repeated a few times and a "slightly longer, downslurred 'tewp' " that also can be given in a rapid series.

== Status ==
The IUCN has assessed the Roraiman antwren as being of Least Concern. It has a large range and an unknown population size that is believed to be decreasing. No immediate threats have been identified. It is considered locally fairly common across its range, which includes some large protected areas. It is believed to be "highly sensitive to human disturbance" but the amount of intact habitat "is vast, and current level of threat from human disturbance is low".
