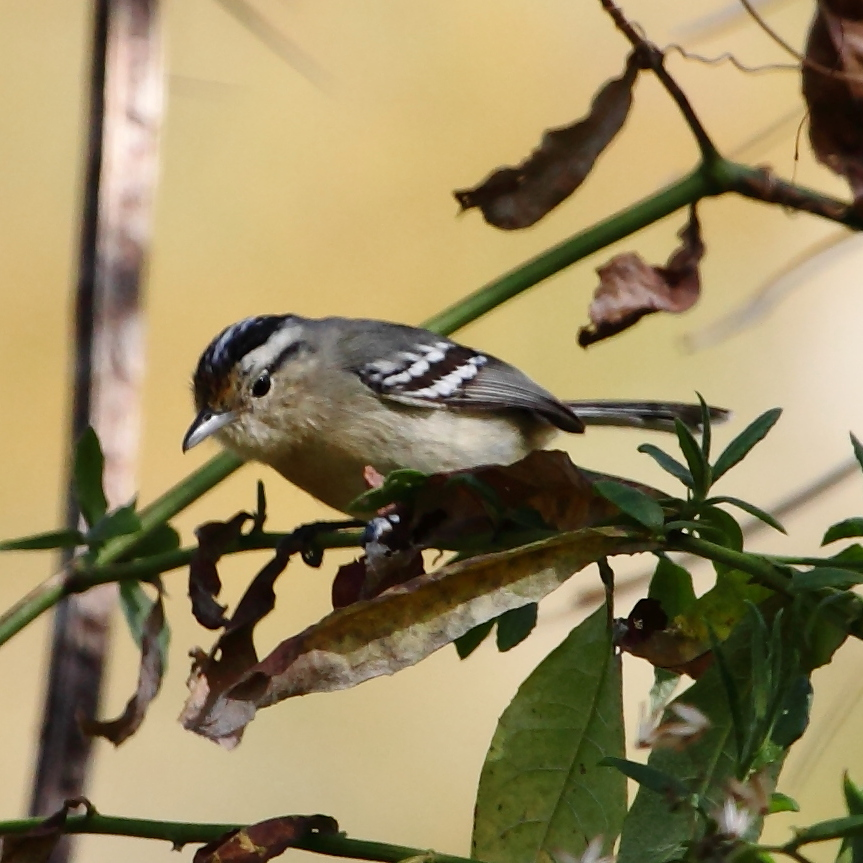
- Female at Dourado, São Paulo State, Brazil

Conservation status
- Least Concern (IUCN 3.1)

Scientific classification
- Kingdom: Animalia
- Phylum: Chordata
- Class: Aves
- Order: Passeriformes
- Family: Thamnophilidae
- Genus: Herpsilochmus
- Species: H. atricapillus

Binomial name
- Herpsilochmus atricapillus Pelzeln, 1868

= Black-capped antwren =

Species of bird

The black-capped antwren (Herpsilochmus atricapillus) is a species of bird in subfamily Thamnophilinae of family Thamnophilidae, the "typical antbirds". It is found in Argentina, Bolivia, Brazil, and Paraguay.

== Taxonomy and systematics ==
The black-capped antwren was described by the Austrian ornithologist August von Pelzeln in 1868 and given its current binomial name Herpsilochmus atricapillus. It and the Bahia antwren (H. pileatus) are sister species. The black-capped antwren is monotypic.

== Description ==
The black-capped antwren is 11 to 12 cm (4.3 to 4.7 in) long and weighs 8 to 11 g (0.28 to 0.39 oz). Adult males have a black crown and nape, a long white to pale gray supercilium, and a black streak through the eye. The rest of their upperparts are gray with white-edged blackish scapulars and a white patch between them. Their wings are black with white tips on the coverts and white edges on the flight feathers. Their tail is black with large white feather tips and white edges on the outermost. Their underparts are mostly gray to pale gray with a white belly. Adult females have a buffish forehead and black and white streaked crown. Their upperparts are gray with an olive tinge and their underparts white with a somewhat ochraceous breast and a pale buff tinge elsewhere. Both sexes vary in the darkness and intensity of the colors.

== Distribution and habitat ==
The black-capped antwren is found from Maranhão and Rio Grande do Norte in northeastern Brazil south to Mato Grosso, Mato Grosso do Sul and extreme western Paraná and São Paulo, and into southeastern Bolivia, the northwestern Argentinian provinces of Jujuy and Salta, and northern and eastern Paraguay. It inhabits all levels of several forest types including deciduous, semi-deciduous, evergreen, and gallery forest. In northeastern Brazil it favors caatinga woodland, semi-deciduous mata-de-cipó, and humid evergreen forest. In elevation it ranges from sea level to 800 m (2,600 ft) in most of its range but reaches 1,450 m (4,800 ft) at the base of the Andes in Bolivia and Argentina.

== Behavior ==
=== Movement ===
The black-capped antwren is believed to be a year-round resident throughout its range.

=== Feeding ===
The black-capped antwren's diet has not been detailed but includes insects and probably spiders. It forages singly, in pairs, and in family groups and frequently as a member of a mixed-species feeding flock. It typically forages between about 7 and 20 m (20 and 70 ft) above the ground but will feed lower at the forest edge. It usually captures prey by gleaning from live foliage, vines, and branches, mostly by reaching or short lunges from a perch. It also often makes short sallies to grab prey. It is not known to follow army ants.

=== Breeding ===
Adult black-capped antwrens have been recorded feeding juveniles in Brazil during January and February, but nothing else is known about the species' breeding biology.

=== Vocalization ===
The black-capped antwren's song varies somewhat across its range but is generally "1–2 (rarely 3) distinct notes leading into rapid series (e.g. 24 notes, 2·3 seconds) rising and falling in pitch and slowing, initial notes at same pitch or higher than abrupt notes that follow". It also has a rattle song, "a series of short but complex notes, more rarely a shorter series of simpler notes". Its calls include an "abrupt, sharply downslurred note" and a "longer note that rises and falls in pitch".

== Status ==
The IUCN has assessed the black-capped antwren as being of Least Concern. It has a very large range and an unknown population size that is believed to be decreasing. No immediate threats have been identified. It is considered fairly common to common across its range and "of medium sensitivity to human disturbance". Its range includes several large protected areas.
