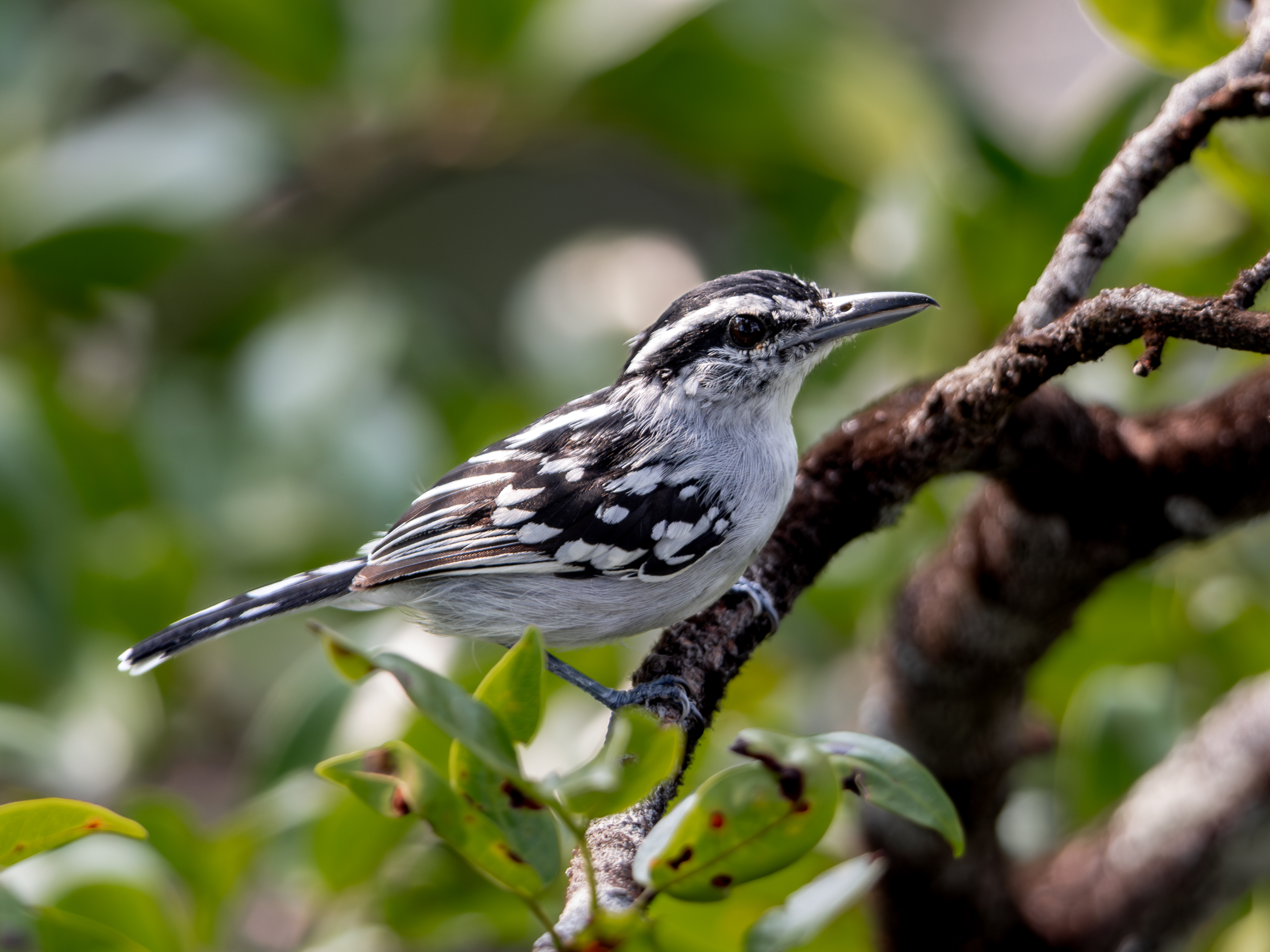
- Male

Conservation status
- Least Concern (IUCN 3.1)

Scientific classification
- Kingdom: Animalia
- Phylum: Chordata
- Class: Aves
- Order: Passeriformes
- Family: Thamnophilidae
- Genus: Herpsilochmus
- Species: H. dorsimaculatus

Binomial name
- Herpsilochmus dorsimaculatus Pelzeln, 1868

= Spot-backed antwren =

Species of bird

The spot-backed antwren (Herpsilochmus dorsimaculatus) is a species of bird in subfamily Thamnophilinae of family Thamnophilidae, the "typical antbirds". It is found in Brazil, Colombia, and Venezuela.

== Taxonomy and systematics ==
The spot-backed antwren was described by the Austrian ornithologist August von Pelzeln in 1868 and given its current binomial name Herpsilochmus dorsimaculatus. The spot-backed antwren is monotypic.

== Description ==
The spot-backed antwren is 11 to 12 cm (4.3 to 4.7 in) long and weighs 9.5 to 10.5 g (0.34 to 0.37 oz). Adult males have a black crown and nape, a long white supercilium, a black streak through the eye, and grayish ear coverts. Their back and rump are dark gray with white edges on most back feathers and blackish patches. They have white-edged black scapulars and a hidden white patch between them. Their flight feathers are gray and black with white edges towards the end; their wing coverts are black with white tips. Their tail is black with white feather tips and white outermost feathers. Their throat and underparts are mostly white with a pale gray tinge on the sides and rear. Adult females have a buff forehead, some buff on their face, white spots on their crown, and a buff breast; they are otherwise like males.

== Distribution and habitat ==
The spot-backed antwren is found in eastern Colombia and east across southern Venezuela and northwestern Brazil to the Rio Trombetas. It inhabits the subcanopy and canopy of humid evergreen forest. In Venezuela it favors igapó, in Colombia and much of Brazil terra firme forest, and some parts of Brazil campina woodlands on white-sand soils. In elevation it reaches 600 m (2,000 ft) in much of its range but only 500 m (1,600 ft) in Colombia.

== Behavior ==
=== Movement ===
The spot-backed antwren is thought to be a year-round resident throughout its range.

=== Feeding ===
The spot-backed antwren's diet has not been detailed but includes insects and probably spiders. It forages singly, in pairs, and in family groups, and often as a member of a mixed-species feeding flock. It typically feeds between 15 and 30 m (50 and 100 ft) above the ground though sometimes as low as 5 m (15 ft). It forages mostly at the ends of leafy branches and in the crown of trees, often concentrating on vine tangles. It forages actively and usually captures prey by gleaning leaves, stems, and vines by reaching or lunging from a perch. It sometimes makes short salllies to hover-glean. It is not known to follow army ants.

=== Breeding ===
Nothing is known about the spot-backed antwren's breeding biology.

=== Vocalization ===
The spot-backed antwren's song is a "very high, fast, slightly rising, then descending and fading, trilling 'wiwiwurrrrrrr' series" that lasts about two seconds. Its call is "a short...downslurred plaintive note, repeated often but irregularly".

== Status ==
The IUCN has assessed the spot-backed antwren as being of Least Concern. It has a large range and an unknown population size that is believed to be decreasing. No immediate threats have been identified. It is considered fairly common across its range, which includes some large protected areas. In addition there are areas of "extensive intact habitat which, although not formally protected, appears to be at little risk of development in near future". However, it is believed to be "highly sensitive to human disturbance".
