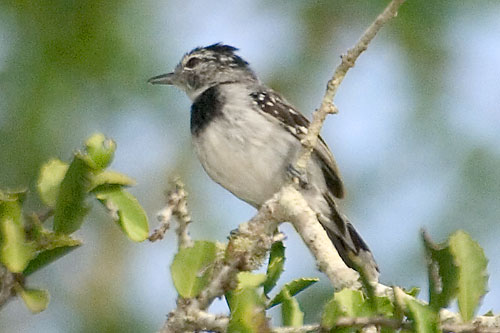

Conservation status
- Vulnerable (IUCN 3.1)

Scientific classification
- Kingdom: Animalia
- Phylum: Chordata
- Class: Aves
- Order: Passeriformes
- Family: Thamnophilidae
- Genus: Herpsilochmus
- Species: H. pectoralis

Binomial name
- Herpsilochmus pectoralis Sclater, PL, 1857

= Pectoral antwren =

Species of bird

The pectoral antwren (Herpsilochmus pectoralis) is a Vulnerable species of bird in subfamily Thamnophilinae of family Thamnophilidae, the "typical antbirds". It is endemic to Brazil.

== Taxonomy and systematics ==
The pectoral antwren was originally described by the English zoologist Philip Sclater in 1857 and given its current binomial name Herpsilochmus pectoralis. Its relationship to others of its genus is unclear but it apparently is most closely related to the large-billed antwren (H. longirostris), and at least one author has considered them to form a superspecies.

The pectoral antwren is monotypic.

== Description ==
The pectoral antwren is 11 to 12 cm (4.3 to 4.7 in) long. Adult males have a black crown and nape with white spots around the former, a long whitish supercilium, a narrow black streak through the eye, and grayish ear coverts. Their back and rump are gray with a black and white patch between the scapulars and white-tipped uppertail coverts. Their wings are black with white-tipped coverts and flight feathers with white edges towards the end. Their innermost tail feathers are black with white edges, the outermost entirely white, and those in between black with white tips. Their throat and underparts are mostly white with a black patch on the breast and gray sides and flanks. Adult females have a rufous crown, brownish olive upperparts, buffish edges on their flight feathers, and buff sides of their neck and their underparts. Their tail is like the male's.

== Distribution and habitat ==
The pectoral antwren has a disjunct distribution. One population is found in far northeastern Brazil from Rio Grande do Norte south to Sergipe and northeastern Bahia. The other is somewhat west in Maranhão. In both areas the species occurs only locally. The Maranhão population inhabits deciduous and gallery forest. In Rio Grande do Norte it inhabits restinga woodlands, and further south inhabits tall caatinga woodlands and mature secondary forest. It does not favor any particular stratum of the forest. In elevation it ranges from sea level to 850 m (2,800 ft).

== Behavior ==
=== Movement ===
The pectoral antwren is thought to be a year-round resident throughout its range.

=== Feeding ===
The pectoral antwren's diet has not been detailed but includes insects and probably spiders. It forages singly, in pairs, and in family groups, and often as a member of a mixed-species feeding flock. It typically feeds between 2.5 and 7 m (8 and 23 ft) above the ground and sometimes as high as 12 m (40 ft). It rarely feeds on the ground. It forages actively and methodically, and usually captures prey by gleaning from leaves, stems, and vines by reaching and sometimes lunging from a perch. It often also makes short sallies to hover-glean. It is not known to follow army ants.

=== Breeding ===
The pectoral antwren's breeding season has not been defined but includes August and September. Nothing else is known about the species' breeding biology.

=== Vocalization ===
The pectoral antwren's song is a "high, very fast chattering series of 'tututjdrrrrrr' notes, which rise rather sharply at the start and may finish slightly falling-off to an abrupt ending". Its call is "a flat 'caa' ".

== Status ==
The IUCN originally in 1988 assessed the pectoral antwren as Threatened and since 1994 as Vulnerable. It has a fragmented distribution within its range, especially in Maranhão. Its estimated population of between 2500 and 10,000 mature individuals is believed to be decreasing. "It is still insufficiently known to determine precise threats, but clearance for irrigated and dry field agriculture has removed extensive tracts of deciduous forest." "Intensive grazing and extensive burning are widespread throughout its range." It occurs in only one small protected area, in Sergipe. "Systematic surveys [are] needed in order to determine true extent of the species' range and population, as well as the best locations for creation of multiple small reserves."
