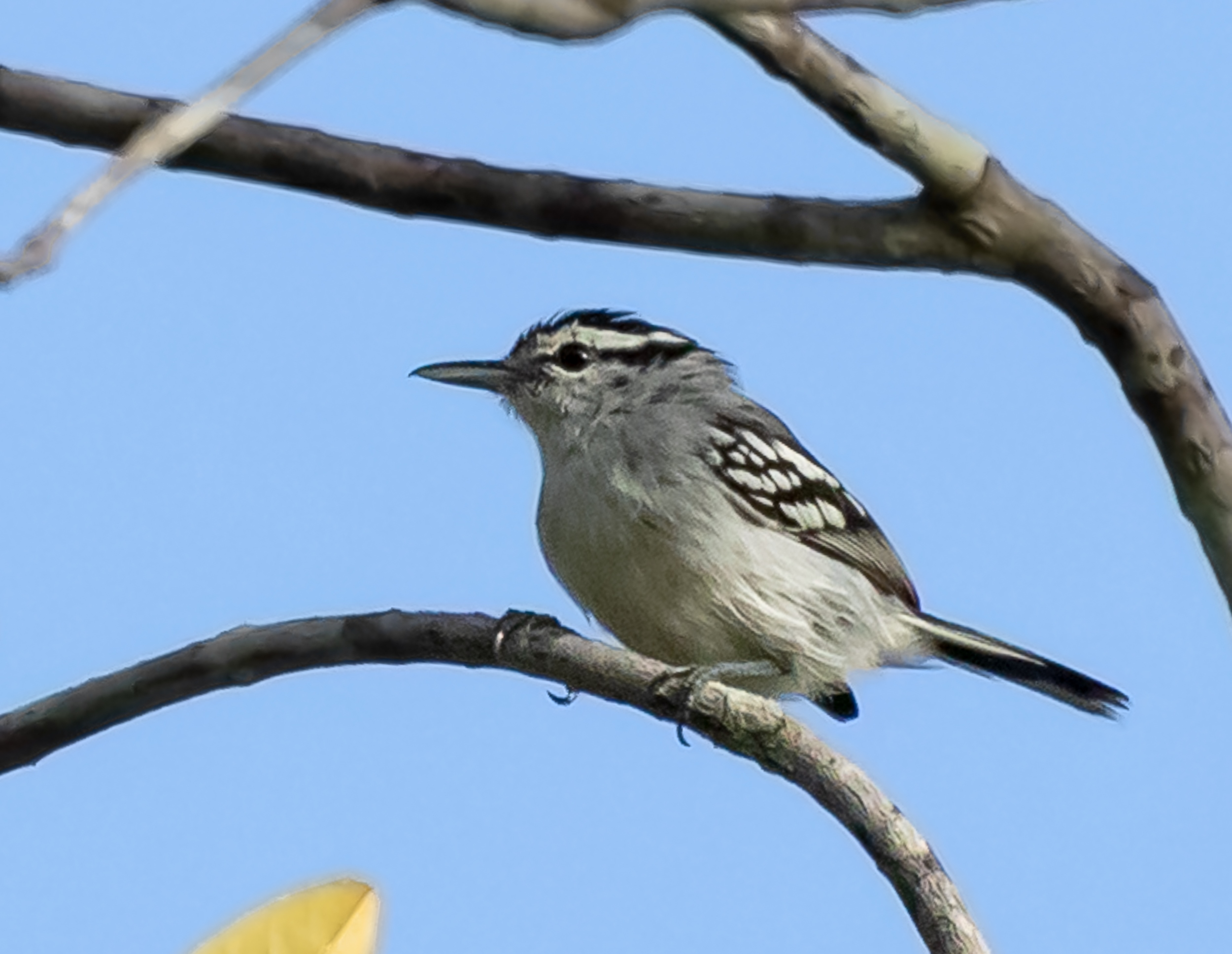

Conservation status
- Least Concern (IUCN 3.1)

Scientific classification
- Kingdom: Animalia
- Phylum: Chordata
- Class: Aves
- Order: Passeriformes
- Family: Thamnophilidae
- Genus: Herpsilochmus
- Species: H. praedictus

Binomial name
- Herpsilochmus praedictus Cohn-Haft & Bravo, 2013

= Predicted antwren =

Species of bird

The predicted antwren (Herpsilochmus praedictus) is an insectivorous bird in subfamily Thamnophilinae of family Thamnophilidae, the "typical antbirds". It is endemic to Amazonian Brazil.

== Taxonomy and systematics ==
The predicted antwren was first described in 2013. The name came from field biologists' expectation that a new species of antwren would be found in southwestern Amazonia. Its discovery confirmed the prediction, and genetic and vocal analysis confirmed its identity as a species. Regional and worldwide taxonomic systems quickly recognized it.

The predicted antwren is monotypic.

== Description ==
The predicted antwren is 11 to 12 cm (4.3 to 4.7 in) long and weighs about 11 g (0.39 oz). Adult males have a black crown and nape, a long whitish supercilium, and a black streak through the eye. The rest of their upperparts are gray with black on the scapulars. Their wings are black with white tips on the coverts and white edges on the flight feathers. Their tail is black with large white feather tips and white edges on the outermost. Their throat is pale creamy white and their breast and belly whitish. Adult females have a rusty forehead and lores, and a black crown with white speckles. Their upperparts are gray. Their throat is a creamier white than the male's.

== Distribution and habitat ==
The predicted antwren is found in the southern part of Brazil's Amazonas state, south of the Amazon between the rios Juruá and Madeira. Most of the sightings have been from the eastern half of its range, east of the Rio Purus. It inhabits the mid- to upper levels of humid evergreen forest, principally campinarana on sandy soil and terra firme on clay soils. It also occurs in seasonally flooded igapó but not várzea.

== Behavior ==
=== Movement ===
The predicted antwren is believed to be a year-round resident throughout its range.

=== Feeding ===
The predicted antwren's diet is known only from the stomach contents of specimens, which were the remains arthropods. It forages singly, in pairs, and in family groups and often as a member of a mixed-species feeding flock. It mostly forages between 5 and 30 m (15 and 100 ft) by gleaning prey from vegetation.

=== Breeding ===
Nothing is known about the predicted antwren's breeding biology.

=== Vocalization ===
The predicted antwren's song is "a soft, purring, rolling trill...which initially rises in frequency...before declining again to a frequency similar to that on which it started". The song is part of the evidence for its treatment as a species, as its pace and the number of repeated notes differ from the songs of visually similar others of its genus. It has two distinctive calls, a "dull 'pwip' " and (more frequently heard) "a short, sharply-descending 'chew', given either singly or in series".

== Status ==
The IUCN has assessed the predicted antwren as being of Least Concern. It has a large range and an unknown population size that is believed to be decreasing. No immediate threats have been identified. It is considered reasonably common and has "a comparatively wide habitat tolerance". Its range "has been subject to comparatively little deforestation and other anthropogenic impacts to date, although these are increasing within the species' core range".

== See also ==
- List of bird species discovered since 1900
