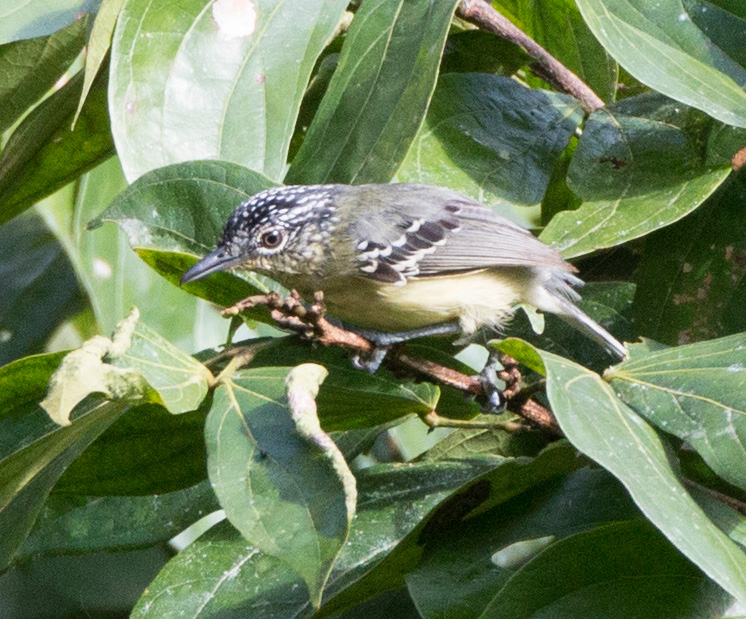
- Male near Zamora, Ecuador

Conservation status
- Least Concern (IUCN 3.1)

Scientific classification
- Kingdom: Animalia
- Phylum: Chordata
- Class: Aves
- Order: Passeriformes
- Family: Thamnophilidae
- Genus: Herpsilochmus
- Species: H. axillaris

Binomial name
- Herpsilochmus axillaris (Tschudi, 1844)

Audio
- Song of yellow-breasted antwren

= Yellow-breasted antwren =

Species of bird

The yellow-breasted antwren (Herpsilochmus axillaris) is a species of bird in subfamily Thamnophilinae of family Thamnophilidae, the "typical antbirds". It is found in Colombia, Ecuador, and Peru.

== Taxonomy and systematics ==
The yellow-breasted antwren has these four subspecies:

- H. a. senex Bond, J & Meyer de Schauensee, 1940
- H. a. aequatorialis Taczanowski & Berlepsch, 1885
- H. a. puncticeps Taczanowski, 1882
- H. a. axillaris (Tschudi, 1844)

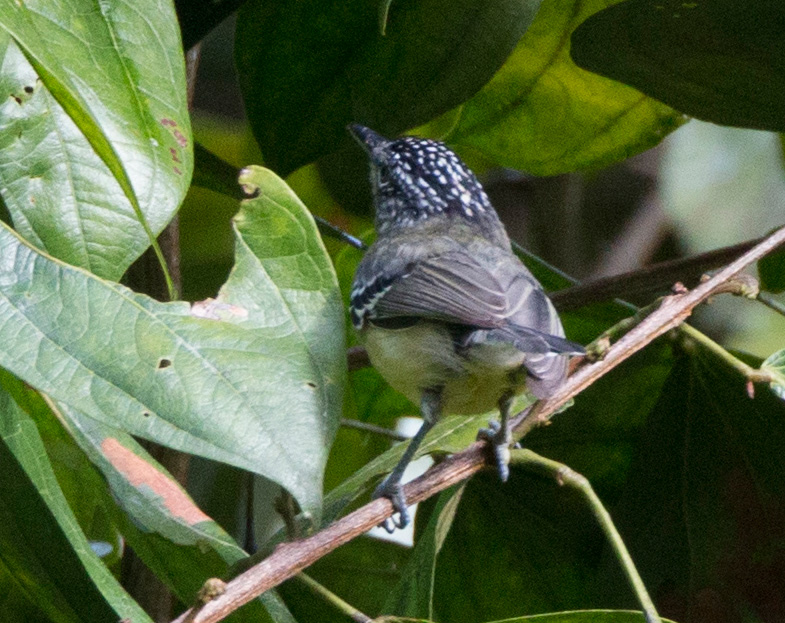
Male near Zamora, Ecuador

== Description ==
The yellow-breasted antwren is 11 to 12 cm (4.3 to 4.7 in) long and weighs 10 to 13 g (0.35 to 0.46 oz). Adult males of the nominate subspecies H. a. axillaris have a black crown and nape with white spots on the crown and a broken whitish supercilium on an otherwise mottled blackish and yellow-olive face. Their upperparts are olive-gray. Their wings coverts are black with yellow-tinged white edges and tips; their flight feathers are very dark gray. Their tail is mostly dark gray, with white tips and part of the edges of the inner feathers and mostly white outer feathers. Their throat and underparts are mostly pale yellowish olive with a yellow center to the belly. Adult females have a cinnamon-rufous crown, olive-buff upperparts, and darker olive underparts except for the yellow belly center. Their wings and tail are like the male's.

Males of subspecies H. a. senex are paler than the nominate, with spots only on the center of their crown and a grayish white throat and breast. Males of subspecies H. a. puncticeps have olive-tinged and grayer upperparts than the nominate and less white on their tail feathers. Females have a dark olive-gray crown with a cinnamon-rufous tinge. Males of subspecies H. a. aequatorialis also have olive-tinged and grayer upperparts than the nominate. Their crown spots are only in the center; they have mostly pale yellow underparts with an olive wash on the sides.

== Distribution and habitat ==
The subspecies of the yellow-breasted antwren are found thus:

- H. a. senex: Colombia's Western and Central Andes between the departments of Risaralda and Cauca
- H. a. aequatorialis: east slope of the Andes from Caquetá Department in southwestern Colombia south through eastern Ecuador into northern Peru as far as the Marañón River in the Department of Cajamarca
- H. a. puncticeps: east slope of the Andes in east-central Peru from the Marañón south to the Department of Junín
- H. a. axillaris: east slope of the Andes of southeastern Peru between the departments of Cuzco and Puno

The ranges of puncticeps and axillaris have a gap between them.

The yellow-breasted antwren inhabits the interior and edges of humid evergreen forest, where it tends to favor the canopy. In elevation it ranges between 800 and 2,000 m (2,600 and 6,600 ft) in Colombia, between 800 and 1,700 m (2,600 and 5,600 ft) in Ecuador, and between 750 and 1,900 m (2,500 and 6,200 ft) in Peru.

== Behavior ==
=== Movement ===
The yellow-breasted antwren is thought to be a year-round resident throughout its range.

=== Feeding ===
The yellow-breasted antwren's diet has not been detailed but includes insects and probably spiders. It usually forages in pairs, sometimes in family groups, but seldom by itself, and almost always as a member of a mixed-species feeding flock. It typically feeds from the forest's mid-level to its canopy; in the mid-level it favors vine tangles. It forages actively and methodically, and usually captures prey by gleaning from leaves, stems, and vines by reaching and sometimes lunging from a perch. It occasionally makes short sallies to hover-glean. It is not known to follow army ants.

=== Breeding ===
One female yellow-breasted antwren was "ready to lay [an] egg" in March in Peru. Nothing else is known about the species' breeding biology.

=== Vocalization ===
The yellow-breasted antwren's song is "a rattle-like trill of dry notes". It has been written as "tree-ee-ee-ee-ee-ee-ew" in Ecuador. In northern Peru it is "tee-tee-TI-TI-titi'ti'tititititititer" and in Cuzco "chew tew-tew-TEE-TEE-ti-ti'ti'ti'tititi". The species' call is "a short...downslurred whistle" written as "tew" or "tchew".

== Status ==
The IUCN originally in 2004 assessed the yellow-breasted antwren as being of Least Concern, in 2012 as Vulnerable, and in 2022 again as of Least Concern. It has a large range and an unknown population size that is believed to be decreasing. "The primary threat to this species is accelerating deforestation for logging and agriculture. It is considered highly sensitive to human disturbance and as such is likely to suffer acutely as a result of forest fragmentation." It is considered local and uncommon in Colombia, uncommon or rare in Ecuador, and rare to uncommon in Peru. Its range includes some large protected areas.
