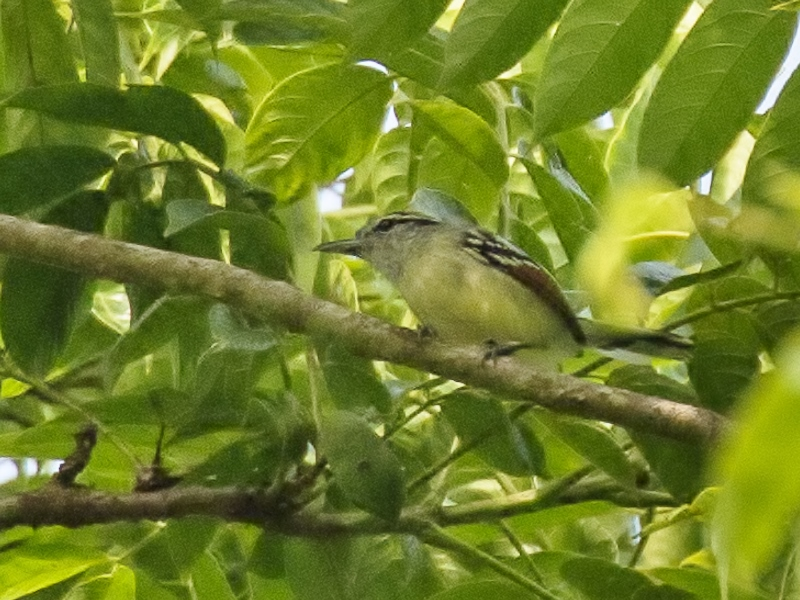

Scientific classification
- Kingdom: Animalia
- Phylum: Chordata
- Class: Aves
- Order: Passeriformes
- Family: Thamnophilidae
- Genus: Herpsilochmus
- Species: H. frater

Binomial name
- Herpsilochmus frater Sclater, PL & Salvin, 1880

= Rusty-winged antwren =

Species of bird

The rusty-winged antwren (Herpsilochmus frater) is a species of bird in subfamily Thamnophilinae of family Thamnophilidae, the "typical antbirds". It is found in Bolivia, Brazil, Colombia, Ecuador, Guyana, Panama, Peru, Suriname, and Venezuela.

== Taxonomy and systematics ==
The rusty-winged antwren's taxonomy is unsettled. Before 2020 the American Ornithological Society, the International Ornithological Committee, and the Clements taxonomy treated it and what is now the rufous-margined antwren (Herpsilochmus rufimarginatus) as a single species, the rufous-winged antwren with the binomial H. rufimarginatus.

These systems assigned it four subspecies:

- H. r. exiguus Nelson, 1912
- H. r. frater Sclater, PL & Salvin, 1880
- H. r. scapularis (zu Wied-Neuwied, 1831)
- H. r. rufimarginatus (Temminck, 1822)

Beginning in 2020 these systems split the rufous-winged antwren into the two current species. They assigned subspecies exiguus and frater to the rusty-winged antwren and merged scapularis into rufimarginatus as the monotypic rufous-margined antwren.

However, by 2018 BirdLife International's Handbook of the Birds of the World (HBW) had split the rufous-winged antwren into the "northern rufous-winged antwren" (as H. scapularis, and including exiguus and frater) and the "southern rufous-winged antwren" (the monotypic H. rufimarginatus). As of early 2024 HBW retains that treatment.

This article follows the majority two-subspecies model.

== Description ==
The rusty-winged antwren is 10 to 12.5 cm (3.9 to 4.9 in) long and weighs about 10 to 12.5 g (0.35 to 0.44 oz). Adult males of the nominate subspecies H. f. frater have a black crown and nape, a wide white supercilium, a black stripe through the eye, and black and white striped ear coverts. Their upperparts are ashy gray with scattered black spots and streaks and a black patch between the scapulars. Their wing coverts are black with wide white tips; most of their flight feathers are blackish with dark cinnamon red outer webs and their tertiaries are blackish with white outer edges. Their tail feathers are black with white tips whose extent increases from the central pair to the almost entirely white outermost. Their throat is white and their underparts are pale yellowish. Adult females have a rich chestnut-rufous crown, a buffy chestnut tinge to their supercilium, brownish olive-gray upperparts, and more white on the tail than males. Their underparts are a stronger yellow than the male's and sometimes have a pale buff wash on the sides of the breast. Their wings are like the male's. Both sexes have a dark gray to brownish iris, a black maxilla, a light gray mandible with a darker tip, and gray to olive-gray legs and feet. Subspecies H. f. exiguus is somewhat smaller than the nominate. Males have nearly pure black upperparts and deep amber edges on the flight feathers. Females have olive-gray (not brownish olive-gray) upperparts.

== Distribution and habitat ==
Both subspecies of the rusty-winged antwren have disjunct distributions. Subspecies H. f. exiguus has the smaller and more westerly range of the two. It is found in Panama from eastern Panamá Province through Darién Province into northwestern Colombia's Córdoba and Bolívar departments. A separate population is found very locally in western Ecuador. The nominate subspecies H. f. frater is found from Colombia's Eastern Andes south through eastern Ecuador and Peru into northern Bolivia, east from Colombia through Venezuela and southern Guyana into Suriname, and northeast from Ecuador, Peru, and Bolivia across Amazonian Brazil south of the Amazon to western Maranhão. A separate population is found coastally in northeastern Brazil's Paraíba, Pernambuco, and Alagoas states.

The rusty-winged antwren inhabits the interior and edges of lowland and foothill evergreen forest of several types including terra firme and gallery forest. It typically is found from the forest's mid-storey to its subcanopy and favors dense vine tangles. In Panama it is found up to about 1,050 m (3,400 ft) of elevation, in Brazil, Venezuela, and the Guianas to 1,500 m (4,900 ft), in Colombia to 1,300 m (4,300 ft), and in Peru to 1,150 m (3,800 ft). In western Ecuador it occurs below 200 m (700 ft) and in eastern Ecuador mostly between 600 and 1,300 m (2,000 and 4,300 ft).

== Behavior ==
=== Movement ===
The rusty-winged antwren is thought to be a year-round resident throughout its range.

=== Feeding ===
The rusty-winged antwren's diet has not been detailed, but is known to be primarily insects and also includes spiders. It usually forages singly, in pairs, and in family groups, and often joins a mixed-species feeding flock as it passes through its territory. It typically feeds between 8 and 30 m (25 and 100 ft) above the ground though as low as 3 m (10 ft) in stunted forest on sandy soil. It forages actively and methodically, and usually captures prey by gleaning from leaves, stems, and vines by reaching and sometimes lunging from a perch. It occasionally makes short sallies to glean from the underside of leaves.

=== Breeding ===
Nothing is known about the rusty-winged antwren's breeding biology.

=== Vocalization ===
The rusty-winged antwren's song is a "stuttered series of notes [that] starts with an accelerating series of 8‒10 rather melodious overslurred notes at initially constant pitch...shifting to a rather unmelodious raspy rattle of some 15‒20 decelerating notes". It has been written as "tu..tu..tu-tu-tu-t-t-r-tr-kr-krkrkrkrkr-kr-krr", "chu, chu, chu-chu-chu-ch-ch-chchch-rrr-chúp", and "ke-ker'er'er'r'r'r'r'E'E'E'E'r'r-bur". Its most common calls are a "descending rattled series of...overslurred notes" and a "short scolding note kurr" whose tonal quality varies somewhat across the species' range.

== Status ==
The IUCN follows HBW taxonomy and so the rusty-winged antwren's two subspecies are included in its assessment of the "northern rufous-winged antwren", which also includes scapularis. It has assessed this taxon as being of Least Concern. It has a very large range; its population size is not known and is believed to be decreasing. No immediate threats have been identified. The rusty-winged atwren is generally considered fairly common to common, though local in Colombia and Ecuador. It occurs in many protected areas "as well as extensive tracts of intact habitat which are not formally protected, but are seemingly at little immediate risk of development".
