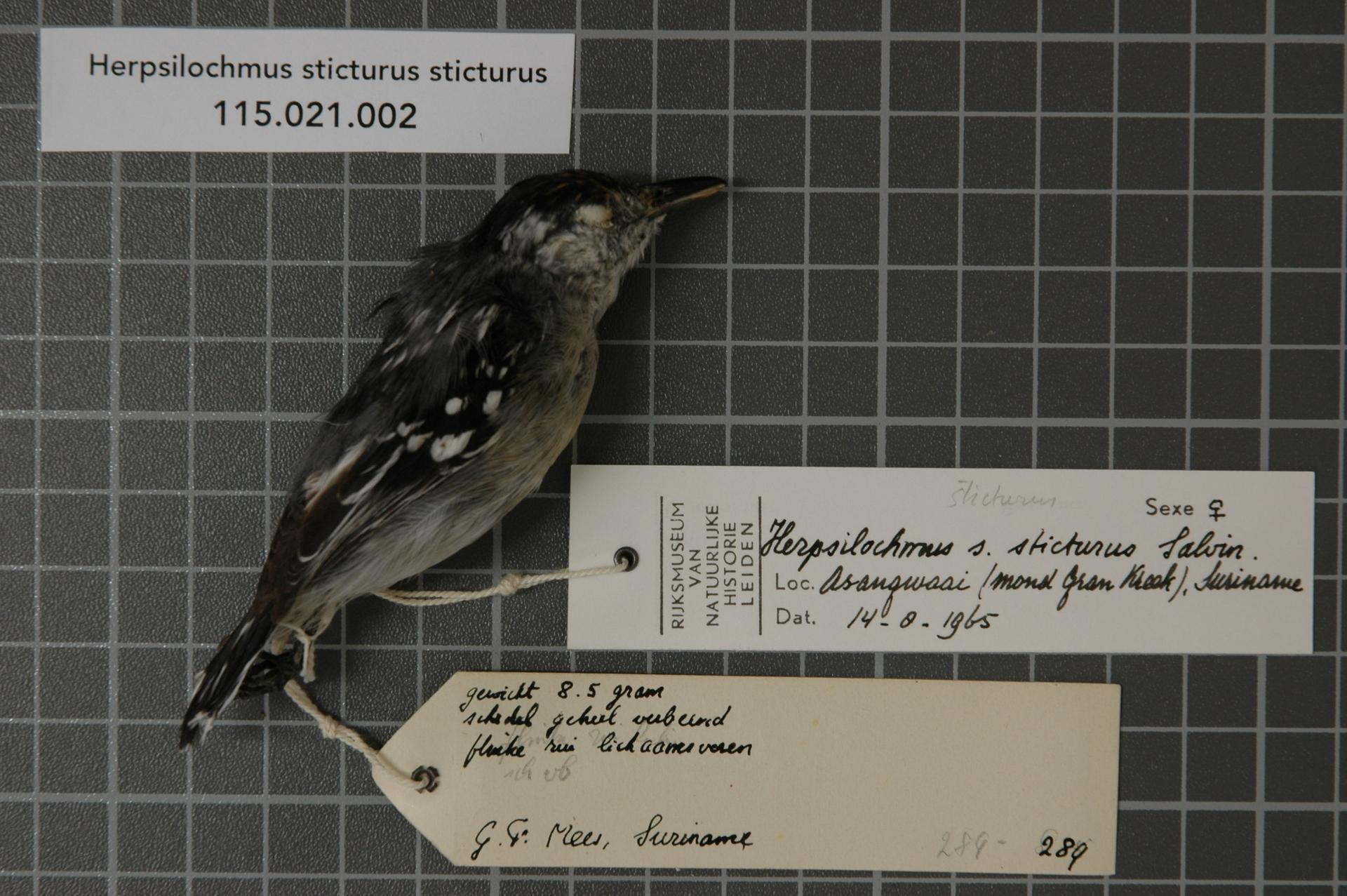

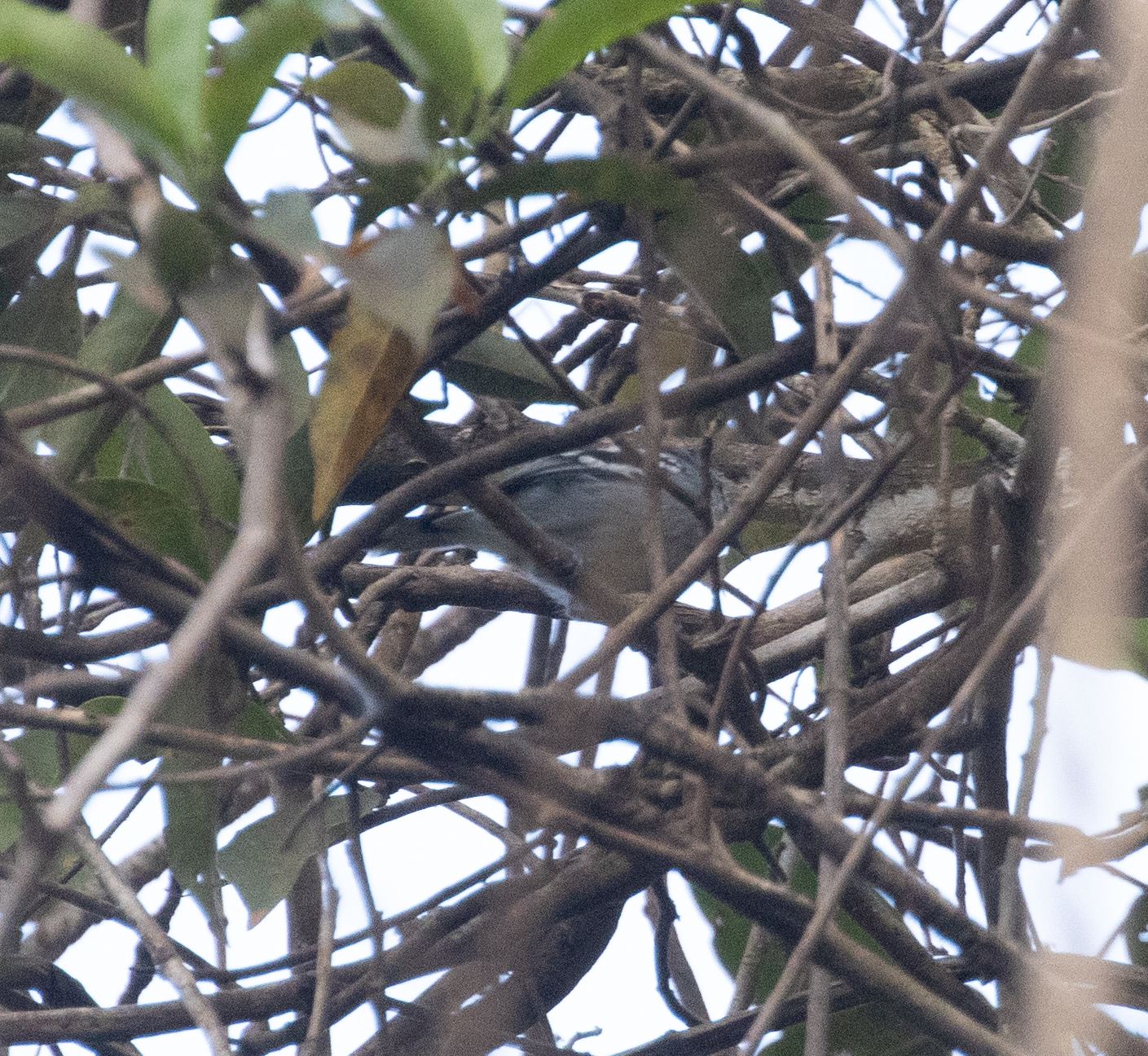

Conservation status
- Least Concern (IUCN 3.1)

Scientific classification
- Kingdom: Animalia
- Phylum: Chordata
- Class: Aves
- Order: Passeriformes
- Family: Thamnophilidae
- Genus: Herpsilochmus
- Species: H. sticturus

Binomial name
- Herpsilochmus sticturus Salvin, 1885

= Spot-tailed antwren =

Species of bird

The spot-tailed antwren (Herpsilochmus sticturus) is a species of bird in subfamily Thamnophilinae of family Thamnophilidae, the "typical antbirds". It is found in Brazil, French Guiana, Guyana, Suriname, and Venezuela.

== Taxonomy and systematics ==
The spot-tailed antwren and Dugand's antwren (H. dugandi) were previously considered conspecific and now are treated as a superspecies. The spot-tailed antwren is monotypic.

== Description ==
The spot-tailed antwren is 9.5 to 10.5 cm (3.7 to 4.1 in) long and weighs 8 to 9 g (0.28 to 0.32 oz). Adult males have a black crown and nape, a long pale gray to white supercilium, a black streak through the eye, and pale grayish ear coverts. Their back and rump are dark gray with black patches, white-edged black scapulars, and a white patch between the scapulars. Their wings are black with white tips on the coverts and white edges on the flight feathers. Their tail is black with white tips and a long white streak on the central feathers. Their throat and underparts are pale gray with a white center to the belly. Adult females have a black crown with rufous-cinnamon streaks, buffy edges on the flight feathers, and paler, buff-tinged, underparts than males.

== Distribution and habitat ==
The spot-tailed antwren is found from eastern Venezuela's Bolívar state east through the Guianas into northeastern Brazil's Amapá state. It inhabits the mid-level to the canopy of humid evergreen forest. It favors areas near water such as gallery forest and seasonally flooded forest and within them frequents vine tangles.

== Behavior ==
=== Movement ===
The spot-tailed antwren is thought to be a year-round resident throughout its range.

=== Feeding ===
The spot-tailed antwren's diet has not been detailed but is known to be mostly arthropods. It forages singly, in pairs, and in family groups, and often as a member of a mixed-species feeding flock. It typically feeds between 15 and 30 m (50 and 100 ft) above the ground. It forages actively and usually captures prey by gleaning leaves, stems, and vines by reaching from a perch. It is not known to follow army ants.

=== Breeding ===
One spot-tailed antwren brood in French Guiana fledged in October. Nothing else is known about the species' breeding biology.

=== Vocalization ===
The spot-tailed antwren's song is a "short, very high, staccato series changing to a rattle" whose first few notes slightly rise. Its calls include a repeated "sharply downslurred 'chut' " and an "abrupt...muffled whistle, mostly upslurred".

== Status ==
The IUCN has assessed the spot-tailed antwren as being of Least Concern. It has a large range and an unknown population size that is believed to be stable. No immediate threats have been identified. It is considered uncommon to fairly common across its range. It occurs in several large protected areas and also "in extensive areas of intact habitat which are not formally protected but appear to be at little risk of development in near future". However, it is believed to be "highly sensitive to human disturbance".
