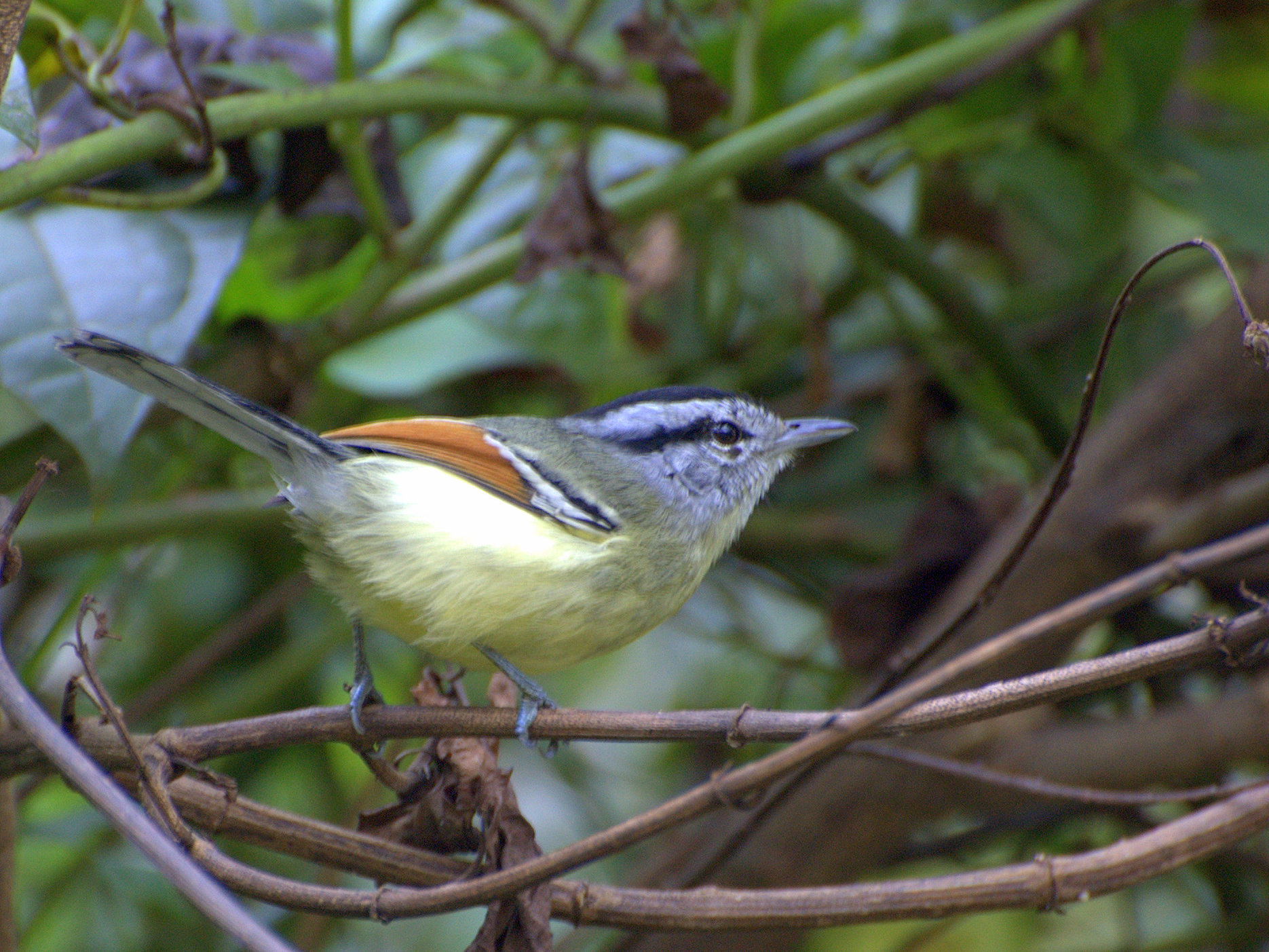
- Male at São Paulo, São Paulo State, Brazil
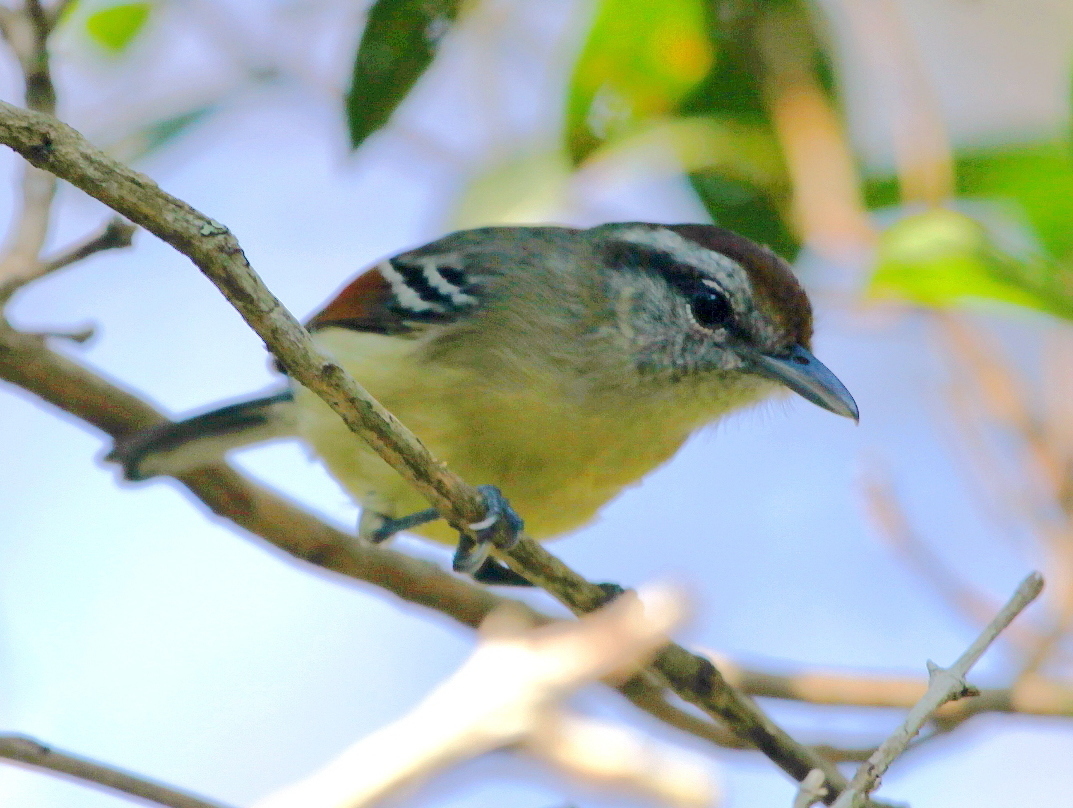
- Female at Bertioga, São Paulo State, Brazil

Conservation status
- Least Concern (IUCN 3.1)

Scientific classification
- Kingdom: Animalia
- Phylum: Chordata
- Class: Aves
- Order: Passeriformes
- Family: Thamnophilidae
- Genus: Herpsilochmus
- Species: H. rufimarginatus

Binomial name
- Herpsilochmus rufimarginatus (Temminck, 1822)

= Rufous-margined antwren =

Species of bird

The rufous-margined antwren (Herpsilochmus rufimarginatus) is an insectivorous bird in subfamily Thamnophilinae of family Thamnophilidae, the "typical antbirds." It is found in Argentina, Brazil, and Paraguay.

== Taxononomy and systematics ==
The rufous-margined antwren was described by the Dutch zoologist Coenraad Jacob Temminck in 1822 and given the binomial name Myiothera rufimarginata. It is now placed in the genus Herpsilochmus which was introduced by the German ornithologist Jean Cabanis in 1847. The specific epithet rufimarginatus is from the Latin rufus "rufous" and marginatus "marginned" or "bordered."

The rufous-margined antwren's taxonomy is unsettled. Before 2020 the American Ornithological Society, the International Ornithological Committee, and the Clements taxonomy treated it and what is now the rusty-winged antwren (Herpsilochmus frater) as a single species, the rufous-winged antwren with the binomial H. rufimarginatus.

These systems assigned it four subspecies:

- H. r. exiguus Nelson, 1912
- H. r. frater Sclater, PL & Salvin, 1880
- H. r. scapularis (zu Wied-Neuwied, 1831)
- H. r. rufimarginatus (Temminck, 1822)

Beginning in 2020 these systems split the rufous-winged antwren into the two current species. They assigned subspecies exiguus and frater to the rusty-winged antwren and merged scapularis into rufimarginatus as the monotypic rufous-margined antwren.

However, by 2018 BirdLife International's Handbook of the Birds of the World (HBW) had split the rufous-winged antwren into the "northern rufous-winged antwren" (as H. scapularis, and including exiguus and frater) and the "southern rufous-winged antwren" (the monotypic H. rufimarginatus). As of early 2024 HBW retains that treatment.

This article follows the majority treatment of a monotypic rufous-margined antwren in which "scapularis" is included but not as a subspecies.

== Description ==
The rufous-margined antwren is 10 to 12.5 cm (3.9 to 4.9 in) long. Adult males have a black crown and nape, a wide whitish supercilium, a black stripe through the eye, and black and white or pale yellow mottled ear coverts. Their upperparts are mostly olive-gray with scattered black patches, yellow uppertail coverts, and white tips on their outer scapulars. Their wing coverts are black with white tips; their flight feathers are olive-brown tinged dark gray with bright cinnamon-rufous edges. Their tail is mostly dark gray with white tips on the feathers and an entirely white outermost pair. Their throat and underparts are light yellow with an olive tinge on the sides. Adult females have a rufous forehead, a rufous-brown crown, and an olive-brown back. Their wings, tail, and underparts are like the male's.

== Distribution and habitat ==
The rufous-margined antwren has a disjunct distribution. A small population is found north of the Rio São Francisco in Brazil's Pernambuco state. The other population is found from Bahia in southeastern Brazil south into Paraguay and northeastern Argentina. It primarily inhabits the interior of humid evergreen Atlantic Forest, less often its edges, and locally in restinga woodlands on white-sand soils. It typically is found from the forest's mid-storey to its subcanopy and favors dense vine tangles. In elevation it ranges from sea level to about 1,100 m (3,600 ft).

== Behavior ==
=== Movement ===
The rufous-margined antwren is thought to be a year-round resident throughout its range.

=== Feeding ===
The rufous-margined antwren's diet has not been detailed, but is known to be primarily insects and also includes spiders. It has also been seen feeding on Rapanea mistletoe berries. It forages actively and methodically, and usually captures prey by gleaning from leaves, stems, and vines by reaching and sometimes lunging from a perch. It occasionally makes short sallies to glean from the underside of leaves. It is not known to follow army ant swarms.

=== Breeding ===
Nothing is known about the rufous-margined antwren's breeding biology.

=== Vocalization ===
The rufous-margined antwren's song is "3‒4 slow-paced notes which rise in frequency, after which a series of fast notes gradually decelerates and drops again in pitch". Pairs often sing in duet. Its most common call is a "melodious whistled note tew" that may be repeated up to five times in a burst or irregularly over a longer period. It also makes a "short trill of short overslurred notes at flat pitch". The species is vocal year-round, usually singing during the day and from the forest canopy.

== Status ==
The IUCN follows HBW taxonomy and so its assessement of H. rufimarginatus as the "southern rufous-winged antwren" does not include "scapularis". That disputed taxon is included in IUCN's assessement of the "northern rufous-winged antwren." Both are assessed as being of Least Concern. Both have large ranges and unknown population sizes. The "southern" population is believed to be stable and the "northern" is believed to be decreasing. No immediate threats to either have been identified. The rufous-margined antwren is considered fairly common to common in most of its range. It occurs in several protected areas and "also reasonable tracts of intact habitat which are not formally protected, but are seemingly at little immediate risk of development".
