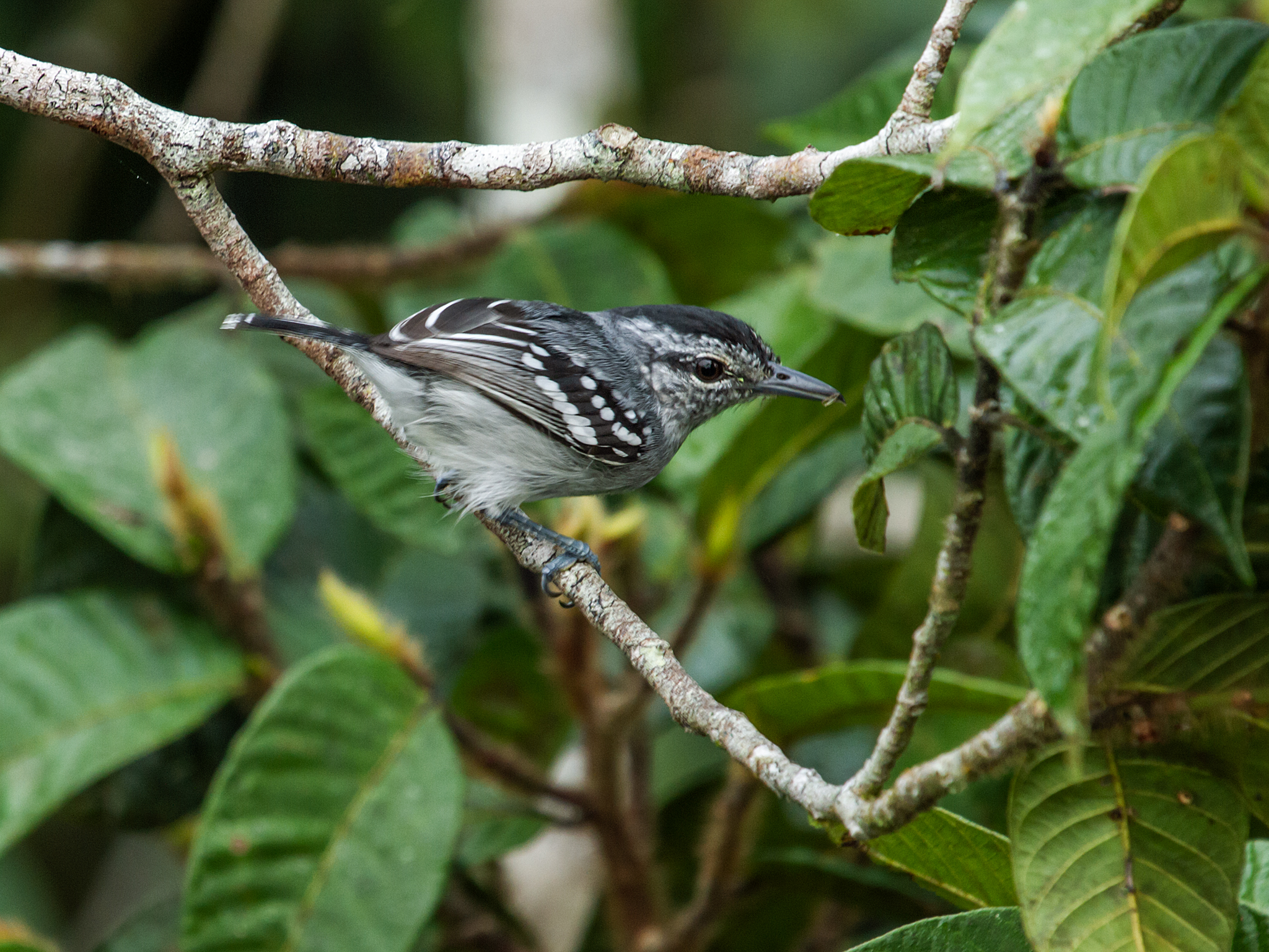

Conservation status
- Least Concern (IUCN 3.1)

Scientific classification
- Kingdom: Animalia
- Phylum: Chordata
- Class: Aves
- Order: Passeriformes
- Family: Thamnophilidae
- Genus: Herpsilochmus
- Species: H. dugandi

Binomial name
- Herpsilochmus dugandi Meyer de Schauensee, 1945

= Dugand's antwren =

Species of bird

Dugand's antwren (Herpsilochmus dugandi) is a species of bird in subfamily Thamnophilinae of family Thamnophilidae, the "typical antbirds". It is found in Colombia, Ecuador, and Peru.

== Taxonomy and systematics ==
Dugand's antwren and the spot-tailed antwren (H.sticturus) were previously considered conspecific and now are treated as a superspecies. The English name and specific epithet of Dugand's antwren commemorate Colombian naturalist Armando Dugand.

Dugand's antwren is monotypic.

== Description ==
Dugand's antwren is 10 to 11.5 cm (3.9 to 4.5 in) long and weighs 9.3 to 11.3 g (0.33 to 0.40 oz). Adult males have a black crown and nape, a long pale gray to white supercilium, a black streak through the eye, and pale grayish ear coverts. Their back and rump are dark gray with black patches, white-edged black scapulars, and a large white patch between the scapulars. Their wings are black with white tips on the coverts and white edges towards the end of the flight feathers. Their tail is black with white tips and a long white streak on the central feathers. Their throat and underparts are pale gray with a white center to the belly. Adult females have a rufous crown and nape and buffy underparts (darker on the breast); they are otherwise like males.

== Distribution and habitat ==
Dugand's antwren is a bird of far western Amazonia. It is found from extreme southern and southeastern Colombia south through eastern Ecuador and into northeastern Peru north of the rios Marañón and Amazon. It inhabits the sub-canopy to canopy of humid evergreen forest, primarily terra firme and also floodplain forest. It is partial to vine tangles. In elevation it mostly occurs between 100 m (330 ft) and 450 m (1,500 ft) but reaches 500 m (1,600 ft) in Colombia and locally elsewhere 600 m (2,000 ft).

== Behavior ==
=== Movement ===
Dugand's antwren is thought to be a year-round resident throughout its range.

=== Feeding ===
The diet of Dugand's antwren has not been detailed but includes insects and probably spiders. It forages singly, in pairs, and in family groups, and often as a member of a mixed-species feeding flock. It typically feeds between 20 and 40 m (65 and 130 ft) above the ground at the ends of leafy branches and in the crown of trees. It forages actively and usually captures prey by gleaning leaves, stems, and vines by reaching from a perch. It sometimes also captures prey with short sallies from a perch and by hover-gleaning. It is not known to follow army ants.

=== Breeding ===
One nest of Dugand's antwren is known. It was a cup of green moss with some lichens in a branch fork 35 m (115 ft) above the ground and well hidden in leaves. It was seen in Peru in June; a male carried food into the nest and brooded the young. Nothing else is known about the species' breeding biology.

=== Vocalization ===
The song of Dugand's antwren is "a fairly rapid, accelerating series of rich notes...tchew-chew-tew-tew 'tu 'tu 'tu 'tututututu" and its call "a quiet tchew".

== Status ==
The IUCN has assessed Dugand's antwren as being of Least Concern. It has a large range and an unknown population size that is believed to be decreasing. No immediate threats have been identified. It is considered uncommon to fairly common in much of its range, though "local and uncommon" in Colombia and "[r]are to uncommon, and local" in Peru. It occurs in several areas protected by governmental agencies and ecotourist lodges, and also in "extensive areas of intact habitat which, although not formally protected, seem to be at little immediate risk of development". However, it is believed to be "highly sensitive to human disturbance".
