= August von Pelzeln =

Austrian ornithologist (1825–1891)

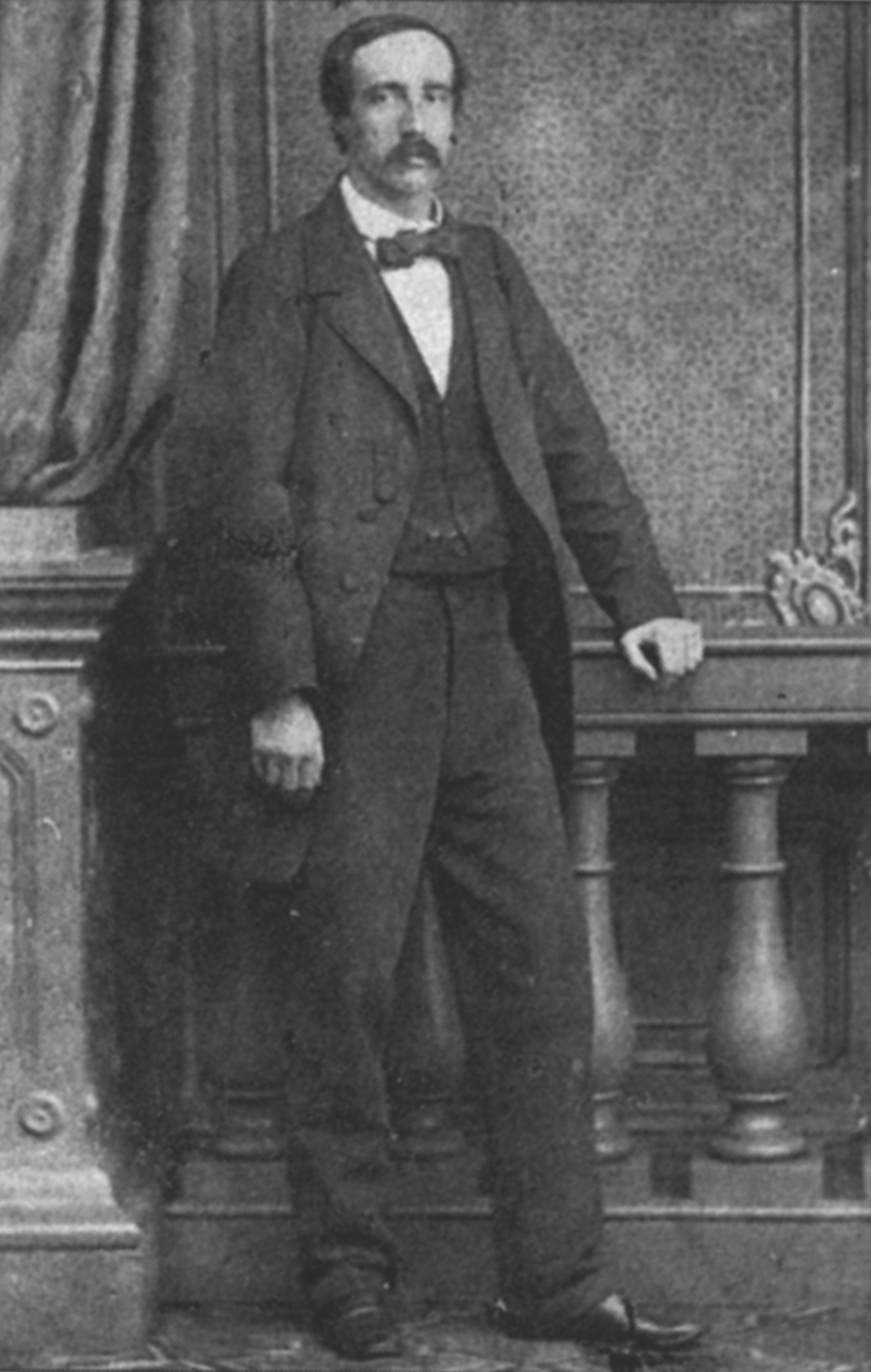
August von Pelzeln

August von Pelzeln (10 May 1825 – 2 September 1891) was an Austrian ornithologist. He was a grandson to novelist Karoline Pichler (1769–1843).

== Life ==
August von Pelzeln was born on 10 May 1825 in Prague. He studied at the University of Vienna, later working as an assistant under helminthologist Karl Moriz Diesing (1800–1867) in the Hof-Naturalien-Cabinet (from 1851). In 1857 he acquired curatorial duties formerly held by Johann Jakob Heckel (1790–1857), and subsequently became in charge of the bird (1857) and mammal (1869) collections. He worked on the birds collected by Johann Natterer in Brazil (343 species).

He was forced to retire from the museum due to ill health, and died at Oberdöbling near Vienna on 2 September 1891.

Some birds described by Pelzeln are the orange-breasted thornbird, the spot-winged antbird, the red-legged tinamou, the white-throated tinamou, the short-billed leaftosser, the yellow-margined flatbill and the New Zealand rockwren.

His name is associated with Pelzeln's tody-tyrant (Hemitriccus inornatus). Gustav Hartlaub (1814–1900) named the Madagascar grebe (Tachybaptus pelzelnii) in his honor; Otto Finsch (1839–1917) named the Pohnpei starling (Aplonis pelzelni) after Pelzeln.

== Works ==
- Bemerkungen gegen Darwin's Theorie vom Ursprung der Spezies. Vienna: A. Pichler Witwe & Sohn (1861).
- Zur Ornithologie Brasiliens, Resultate von Johann Natterers Reisen in den Jahren 1817 bis 1835, Johann Natterer, Vienna, A. Pichler's Witwe & Sohn (1868- 1870 3 volumes). BHL
- Beiträge zur Ornithologie Südafrikas (1882) - Contributions to the ornithology of southern Africa.
- Many papers in "Sitzungsberichte der Kaiserliche Akademie der Wissenschaften in Wien" (usually abbreviated Sitz.K.Akad.Wiss.Wien).
