= Streaked antwren =

There are two species of bird named streaked antwren:

- Guianan streaked antwren, Myrmotherula surinamensis
- Amazonian streaked antwren, Myrmotherula multostriata
