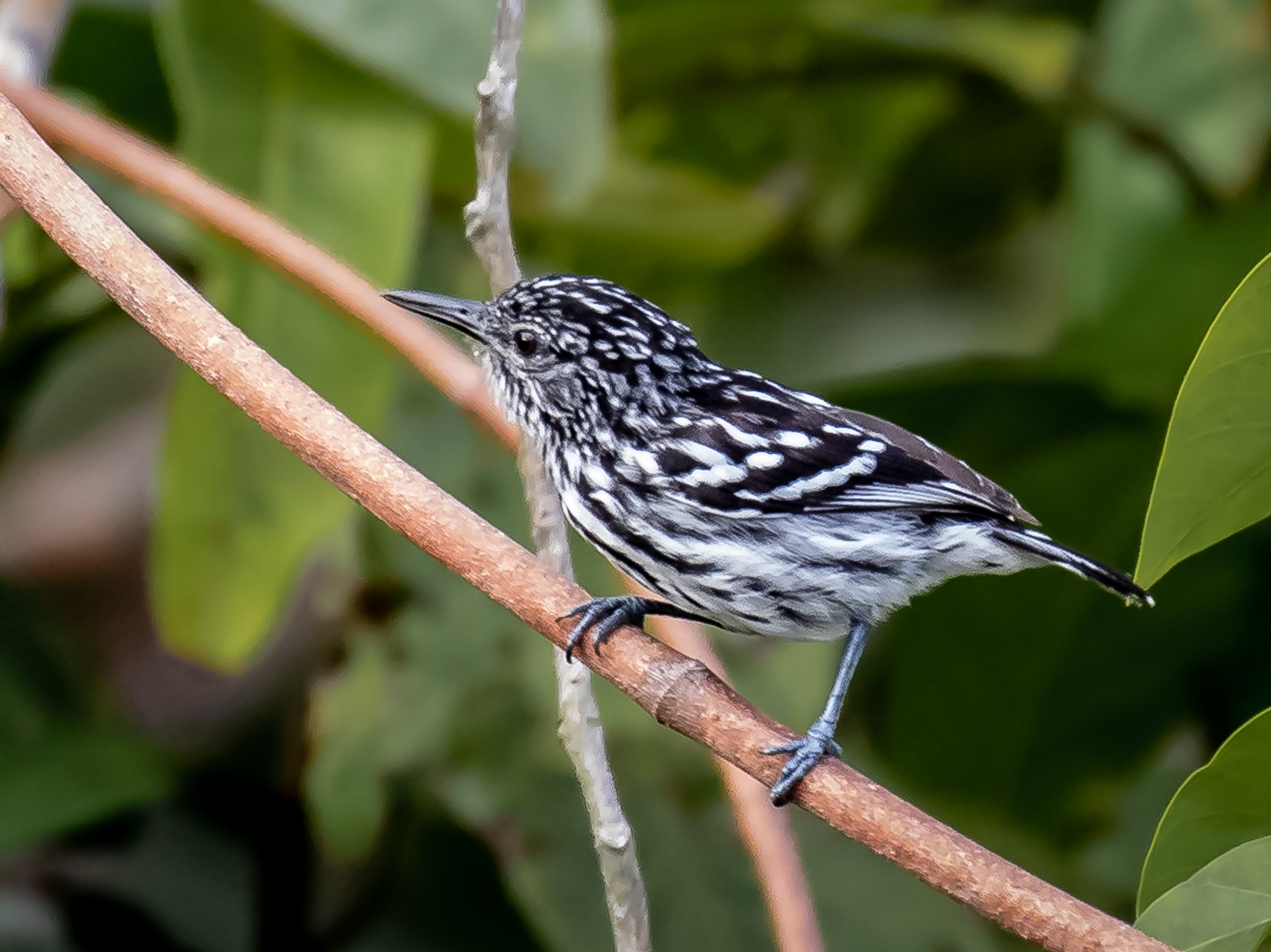
- Male at Anavilhanas National Park, Novo Airão, Amazonas state, Brazil

Conservation status
- Least Concern (IUCN 3.1)

Scientific classification
- Kingdom: Animalia
- Phylum: Chordata
- Class: Aves
- Order: Passeriformes
- Family: Thamnophilidae
- Genus: Myrmotherula
- Species: M. cherriei

Binomial name
- Myrmotherula cherriei Berlepsch & Hartert, 1902

= Cherrie's antwren =

Species of bird

Cherrie's antwren (Myrmotherula cherriei) is a species of bird in subfamily Thamnophilinae of family Thamnophilidae, the "typical antbirds". It is found in Brazil, Colombia, Peru, and Venezuela.

== Taxonomy and systematics ==
Cherrie's antwren is monotypic. Its closest relative is believed to be the Pacific antwren (M. pacifica).

The species' English name and specific epithet honor the American naturalist, explorer, and adventurer George Cherrie. Dr. Cherrie accompanied former President Theodore Roosevelt in the famous 1913 exploration of the River of Doubt, in the Brazilian Amazon basin, which was later named Rio Roosevelt.

== Description ==
Cherrie's antwren is 9 to 10 cm (3.5 to 3.9 in) long and weighs 7.5 to 9 g (0.26 to 0.32 oz). It is a smallish bird with a tiny tail. Adult males have a black and white streaked face. Their crown, back, and rump are black with white streaks. They have a narrow white patch between the shoulders. Their tail is black with white edges and tips to the feathers. Their wings are black with white tips on the coverts and white edges on the flight feathers. Their throat, breast, and belly are white and their flanks and crissum grayer. Black streaks extend from the throat to the flanks and belly. Adult females have buff streaks (not white) on the head. They lack the white patch between the shoulders. Their underparts are pale buff with thinner black streaks than the male's.

== Distribution and habitat ==
Cherrie's antwren has a disjunct distribution. The much larger part of its range extends from southeastern Colombia east through southwestern Venezuela into the watersheds of the Rio Negro and its tributary Rio Branco in Brazil. A separate population is found in northeastern Peru's Department of Loreto. The species inhabits a variety of landscapes. In much of its range it occurs in the understorey and mid-storey of stunted shrubby woodlands on white-sand soil. It also occurs in gallery forest within savanna, especially in Colombia. In Brazil it occurs in várzea, and along the Rio Negro appears to greatly favor thickets on islands, sandbars, and beside lagoons. In Peru it occurs along the edges of streams and lagoons.

== Behavior ==
=== Movement ===
Cherrie's antwren is believed to be a year-round resident throughout its range.

=== Feeding ===
Cherrie's antwren feeds on arthropods, especially insects and spiders. It typically forages singly or in pairs and often joins mixed-species feeding flocks. It mostly feeds in dense foliage between about 1 and 7 m (3 and 20 ft) above the ground, though sometimes as high as 10 m (35 ft). It actively seeks prey among leaves and vine tangles and along branches, gleaning by reaching, lunging, and with brief sallies from a perch.

=== Breeding ===
Only a few nests of Cherrie's antwren are known. They were seen in Brazil in September, in February in Colombia, and in April also in Colombia. They were a deep cup or pouch of plant fibers and (in one) fungal rhizomorphs. One was hung over water and another over land close to water. The only known clutch was of two eggs. It appears that both parents provision nestlings. The incubation period, time to fledging, and other details of parental care are not known.

=== Vocalization ===
The song of Cherrie's antwren is a "short, very high, sharp, rattling trill, slightly rising at start". Its call is a "high, nasal 'tjeew' or 'teetjuw' ".

== Status ==
The IUCN has assessed Cherrie's antwren as being of Least Concern. It has a large range; its population size is not known and is believed to be decreasing. No immediate threats have been identified. It is considered locally fairly common but patchily distributed, and occurs in a few protected areas. Its sandy soil habitat in Brazil is little affected by human encroachment, but in Peru it is "heavily exploited by expanding human populations".
