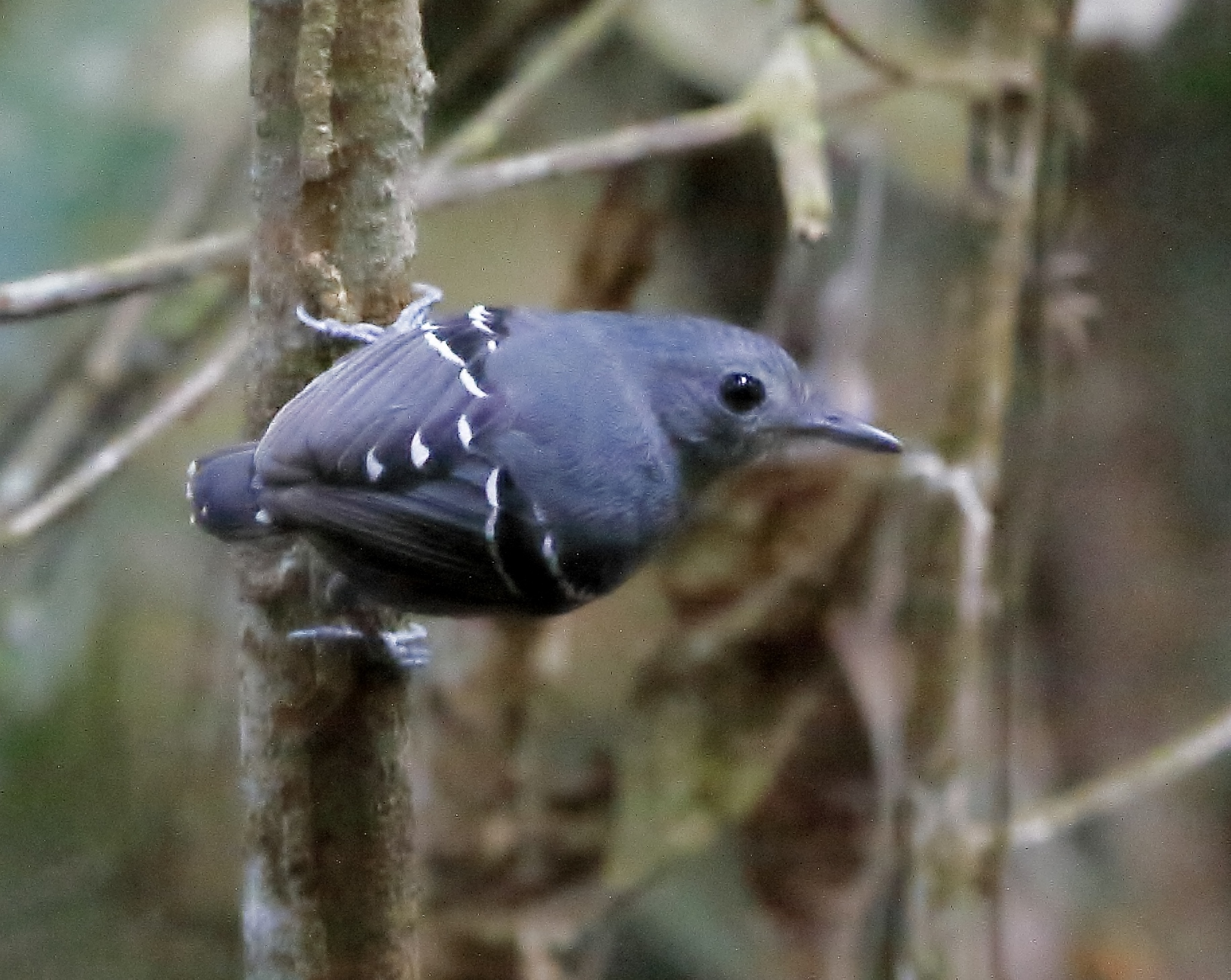
- Male
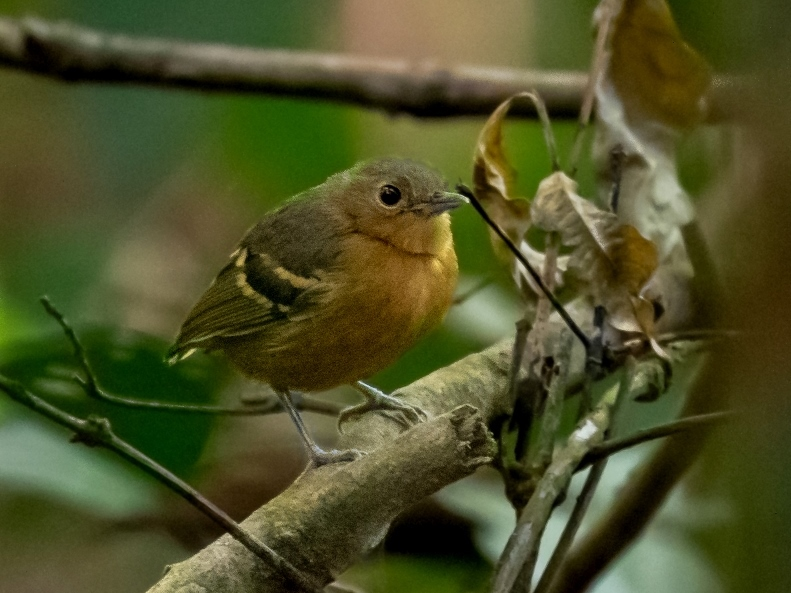
- Female

Conservation status
- Least Concern (IUCN 3.1)

Scientific classification
- Kingdom: Animalia
- Phylum: Chordata
- Class: Aves
- Order: Passeriformes
- Family: Thamnophilidae
- Genus: Isleria
- Species: I. hauxwelli

Binomial name
- Isleria hauxwelli (Sclater, PL, 1857)

Synonyms
- Myrmotherula hauxwelli

= Plain-throated antwren =

Species of bird

The plain-throated antwren (Isleria hauxwelli) is a species of bird in subfamily Thamnophilinae of family Thamnophilidae, the "typical antbirds". It is found in Bolivia, Brazil, Colombia, Ecuador, and Peru.

== Taxonomy and systematics ==
The plain-throated antwren was described by the English zoologist Philip Sclater in 1857 and given the binomial name Formicivora hauxwelli in honour of the collector of the type specimen, John Hauxwell. It was later moved to genus Myrmotherula and then to the current genus Isleria that was introduced in 2012. The plain-throated antwren shares genus Isleria with the rufous-bellied antwren (I. guttata) and the two form a superspecies.

The plain-throated antwren's further taxonomy is unsettled. The International Ornithological Committee assigns it these four subspecies:

- I. h. suffusa (Zimmer, JT, 1932)
- I. h. hauxwelli (Sclater, PL, 1857)
- I. h. clarior (Zimmer, JT, 1932)
- I. h. hellmayri (Snethlage, E, 1906)

The Clements taxonomy and BirdLife International's Handbook of the Birds of the World do not separately recognize I. h. clarior but include it within the nominate subspecies I. h. hauxwelli.

This article follows the four-subspecies model.

== Description ==
The plain-throated antwren is 8.5 to 10 cm (3.3 to 3.9 in) long and weighs 9 to 12 g (0.32 to 0.42 oz). It has a very short tail. Adult males of the nominate subspecies are mostly gray that is paler on their underside. They have a whitish throat, a white patch between their scapulars, and white spots on their uppertail coverts. Their wings and tail are blackish brown with white edges on the flight feathers and white tips on the wing coverts and tail feathers. Adult females have cinnamon-rufous washed grayish upperparts and tawny-cinnamon underparts with a paler throat and an olive tinge on the sides and flanks. Their flight feathers have dull cinnamon edges. Juveniles resemble females but with an overall olive tinge. Subspecies I. h. suffusa males have smaller white spots than the nominate; females are darker than the nominate. Subspecies I. h. hellmayri males are darker than the nominate and lack the white patch between the scapulars. Females are darker than the nominate, especially on their underparts, but have a whitish throat. Subspecies I. h. clarior is almost identical to the nominate.

== Distribution and habitat ==
The plain-throated antwren is a bird of the Amazon Basin. Its subspecies are found thus:

- I. h. suffusa: southeastern Colombia south through eastern Ecuador into northeastern Peru to the Marañón River and east into extreme northwestern Brazil to the Japurá River
- I. h. hauxwelli: eastern Peru south of the Marañón and Amazon rivers, northeastern Bolivia, and southwestern Brazil
- I. h. clarior: central Brazil
- I. h. hellmayri: Brazil east of the Xingu River

The plain-throated antwren primarily inhabits terra firme evergreen forest, and also várzea, igapó, and transitional forest. It favors areas with shady undergrowth and much leaf litter. In elevation it mostly occurs below 600 m (2,000 ft) and is only rarely found up to 900 m (3,000 ft). It Colombia it is found below 500 m (1,600 ft) and in Ecuador mostly below 400 m (1,300 ft).

== Behavior ==
=== Movement ===
The plain-throated antwren is believed to be a year-round resident throughout its range.

=== Feeding ===
The plain-throated antwren's diet is mostly insects and spiders and might also include small lizards. It mostly forages singly or in pairs, and joins mixed-species feeding flocks while they pass through the antwren's territory. It typically forages from the ground up to within about 1 m (3 ft) above it but will feed as high as 3 m (10 ft). It actively gleans from leaves, stems, and branches by reaching from a perch and making short jumps while hitching up vertical stems and vines. It also frequently takes prey from leaf litter while hopping on the ground and also by fluttering up from the ground or a perch. It has been observed following army ant swarms in Brazil, Ecuador, and Peru.

=== Breeding ===
The plain-throated antwren's breeding season appears to vary geographically but is generally between October and February and perhaps extends to April. Its nest is a cup of rootlets and other fibers suspended in a fork or between two twigs close to the ground. The clutch size is thought to be two eggs. Females are known to incubate the clutch and males probably do as well. The incubation period, time to fledging, and other details of parental care are not known.

=== Vocalization ===
The plain-throated antwren's song is a "series of very high, crescendoing, slightly accelerating 'weec' notes". Its call is a "very high, strident 'wic' ".

== Status ==
The IUCN has assessed the plain-throated antwren as being of Least Concern. It has a very large range. Its population size is not known and is believed to be decreasing. No immediate threats have been identified. It is considered fairly common across its range. It occurs in several large protected areas and "the species' range encompasses vast contiguous areas of intact habitat which, although not formally protected, are under little or no current threat of development".
