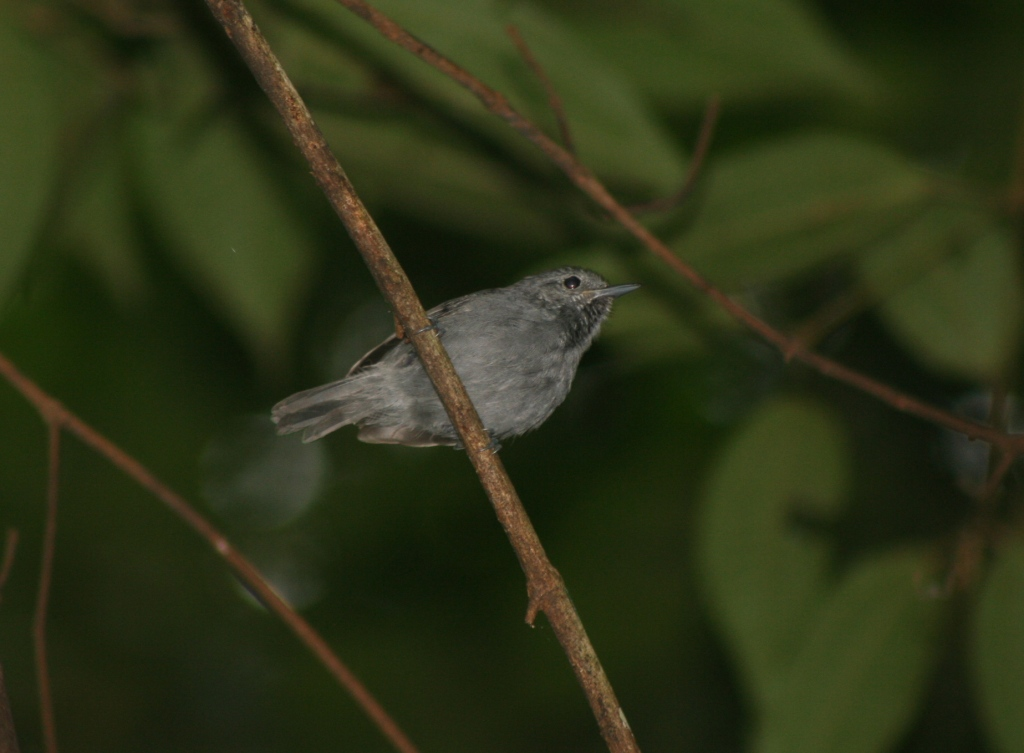
- Unicolored antwren (Myrmotherula unicolor)

Scientific classification
- Kingdom: Animalia
- Phylum: Chordata
- Class: Aves
- Order: Passeriformes
- Family: Thamnophilidae
- Genus: Myrmotherula; Sclater, PL, 1858

Type species
- Muscicapa pygmaea Gmelin, 1789

Species
- See text

= Myrmotherula =

Genus of birds

Myrmotherula is a genus of insectivorous passerine birds in the antbird family, Thamnophilidae. These are all small antbirds, measuring 9–11.5 cm (3.5–4.5 in).

== Taxonomy ==
The genus Myrmotherula was erected by the English zoologist Philip Sclater in 1858. The type species is the pygmy antwren. Myrmotherula is a diminutive of the name Myrmothera that had been introduced in 1816 by the French ornithologist Louis Vieillot for the antpittas. Myrmothera combines the Ancient Greek μυρμος/murmos meaning "ant" with -θηρας/-thēras meaning "hunter".

The genus currently contains the following species:

Streaked group:

| Image | Common name | Scientific name | Distribution |
|---|---|---|---|
| | Moustached antwren | Myrmotherula ignota | western Amazonia and Tumbes-Chocó-Magdalena |
| | Pygmy antwren | Myrmotherula brachyura | Amazonia |
| | Guianan streaked antwren | Myrmotherula surinamensis | Giuana Shield |
| | Amazonian streaked antwren | Myrmotherula multostriata | Amazonia |
| | Pacific antwren | Myrmotherula pacifica | Tumbes-Chocó-Magdalena |
| | Cherrie's antwren | Myrmotherula cherriei | northern Amazonia |
| | Klages's antwren | Myrmotherula klagesi | Branco and lower Amazon River |
| | Stripe-chested antwren | Myrmotherula longicauda | eastern foothills of northern Andes |
| - | Yellow-throated antwren | Myrmotherula ambigua | north of upper Rio Negro |
| | Sclater's antwren | Myrmotherula sclateri | southern Amazonia |

Grey group:

| Image | Common name | Scientific name | Distribution |
|---|---|---|---|
| | White-flanked antwren | Myrmotherula axilliaris | Central America and northern South America |
| | Silvery-flanked antwren | Myrmotherula luctuosa | Atlantic Forest |
| | Slaty antwren | Myrmotherula schisticolor | Central America and Northern Andes |
| - | Rio Suno antwren | Myrmotherula sunensis | sparse range across western Amazonia |
| | Salvadori's antwren | Myrmotherula minor | mid Atlantic Forest |
| | Long-winged antwren | Myrmotherula longipennis | Amazonia |
| | Band-tailed antwren | Myrmotherula urosticta | Bahia coastal forests |
| | Ihering's antwren | Myrmotherula iheringi | southern Amazonia |
| - | Rio de Janeiro antwren | Myrmotherula fluminensis | Serra dos Órgãos |
| | Yungas antwren | Myrmotherula grisea | Yungas |
| | Unicolored antwren | Myrmotherula unicolor | southern Atlantic Forest |
| | Alagoas antwren | Myrmotherula snowi | Pernambuco coastal forests |
| - | Plain-winged antwren | Myrmotherula behni | tepuis and sparsely across northern Andes |
| | Grey antwren | Myrmotherula menestriesii | Amazonia |
| | Leaden antwren | Myrmotherula assimilis | riverine Amazonia |

Several species previously included in this genus as the "stipple-throated group" have now been transferred to a new genus, Epinecrophylla based on a 2006 study of nest architecture, foraging behaviour and vocal repertoire. A molecular genetic study published in 2012 found that the genus was not monophyletic. As a step in creating monophyletic genera, two species that were only distantly related to the other members of Myrmotherula, the rufous-bellied antwren and the plain-throated antwren, were moved to the newly erected genus Isleria. A further study published in 2014 confirmed that the species remaining in Myrmotherula formed a paraphyletic group with respect to the genera Terenura, Formicivora, Stymphalornis and Myrmochanes.
