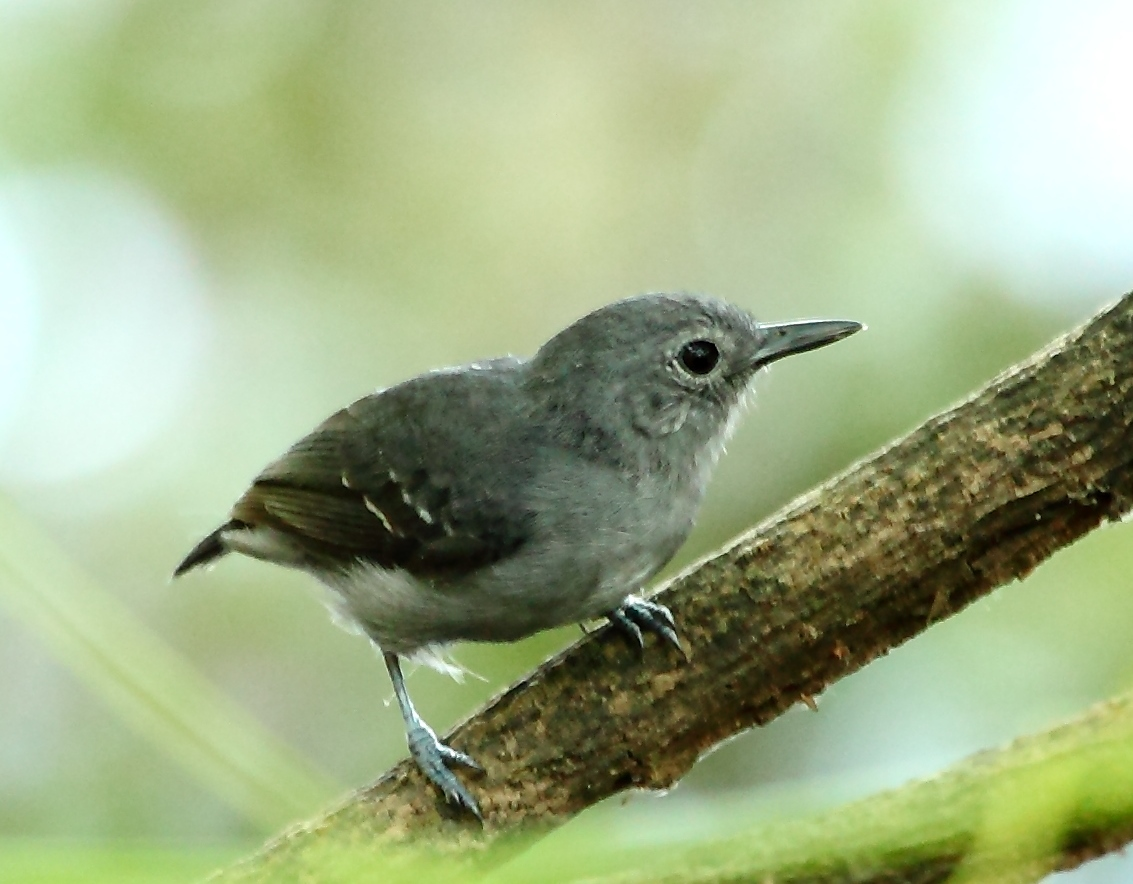
- Male
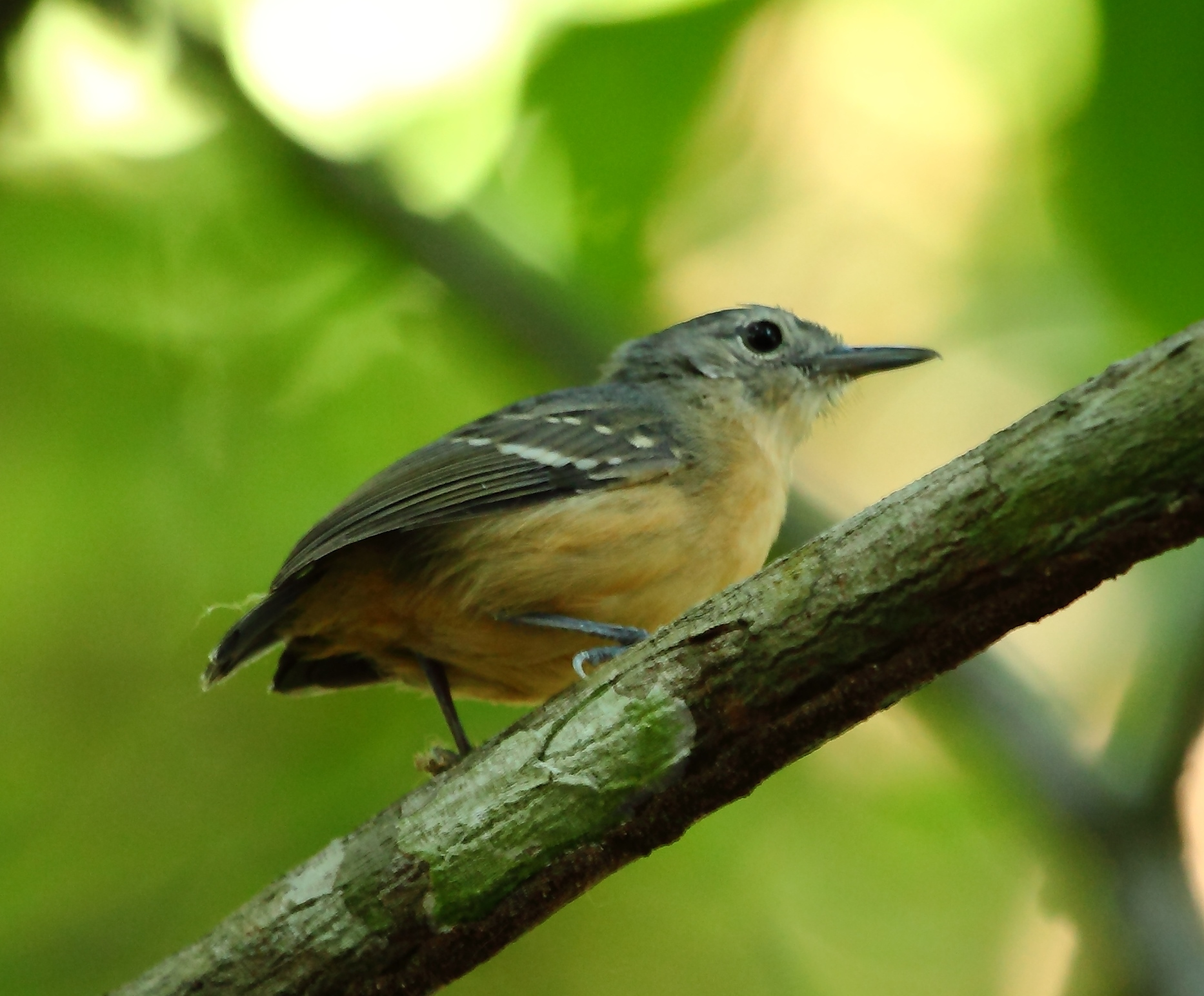
- Female

Conservation status
- Least Concern (IUCN 3.1)

Scientific classification
- Kingdom: Animalia
- Phylum: Chordata
- Class: Aves
- Order: Passeriformes
- Family: Thamnophilidae
- Genus: Myrmotherula
- Species: M. assimilis

Binomial name
- Myrmotherula assimilis Pelzeln, 1868

= Leaden antwren =

Species of bird

The leaden antwren (Myrmotherula assimilis) is a species of bird in subfamily Thamnophilinae of family Thamnophilidae, the "typical antbirds". It is found in Bolivia, Brazil, Colombia, and Peru.

== Taxonomy and systematics ==
The leaden antwren was described by the Austrian ornithologist August von Pelzeln in 1868 and given its current binomial name Myrmotherula assimilis. It has two subspecies, the nominate M. a. assimilis (Pelzeln, 1868) and M. a. transamazonica (Gyldenstolpe, 1951).

== Description ==
The leaden antwren is 9 to 10.5 cm (3.5 to 4.1 in) long and weighs 8.2 to 10.5 g (0.29 to 0.37 oz). It is a small bird with a short tail. Adult males of the nominate subspecies have a medium gray crown, back, and rump with a hidden white patch between the shoulders. Their wing coverts are medium gray with white tips and their flight feathers are dusky. Their tail is gray. Their underparts are pale gray that is palest on the throat. Adult females have a medium brownish gray to olive gray crown, back, and rump with a hidden white patch between the shoulders. Their wings are olive brown with pale buff or whitish buff tips on the coverts. Their tail is gray or dusky. Their face is pale gray, their throat whitish buff, and the rest of their underparts pale buff. Males have a black bill; females have a black maxilla and a gray mandible. Both sexes have a brown iris and blue-gray legs and feet. Subspecies M. a. transamazonica is larger than the nominate, and males have paler gray upperparts.

== Distribution and habitat ==
The leaden antwren is found almost entirely on islands in the Amazon River and its major tributaries; it locally occurs along the rivers' banks and the shores of oxbow lakes. The nominate subspecies has by far the larger range of the two. In Peru it is found along the upper Amazon from the lower Marañón River; where the river forms the Peru-Colombia border there are records in the latter country. In northern Bolivia it occurs along the lower reaches of the Beni and Guaporé rivers, which are tributaries of the Madeira River. In Brazil it occurs along the Madeira, along the lower reaches of the Negro, Juruá, and Purus rivers, and along the Amazon itself as far east as the border between Amazonas and Pará states. Subspecies M. a. transamazonica is found along the Amazon from the Amazonas-Pará border east to the mouth of the Tapajós River.

The leaden antwren almost exclusively inhabits the understory of tall Cecropia forest on river islands, as long as the understory is composed of many species in addition to Cecropia.

== Behavior ==
=== Movement ===
The leaden antwren is believed to be a year-round resident throughout its range.

=== Feeding ===
The leaden antwren's diet is not known in detail but is mostly insects and probably spiders. It forages singly, in pairs, or in family groups, and only occasionally as part of a mixed-species feeding flock. It feeds mostly between about 1.5 and 7 m (5 and 20 ft) above the ground though sometimes as high as 15 m (50 ft). It actively gleans its prey, mostly from leaves (live and dead) and bark. It sometimes makes short sallies from a perch.

=== Breeding ===
The leaden antwren's breeding season includes October, but nothing else is known about the species' breeding biology.

=== Vocalization ===
The leaden antwren's song is "an accelerating, descending trill: tew tew-tew-tew'tew'tew'tew'tu'tu'teerrrrrrrru". Its call is "a short, downslurred snew, emphatic and somewhat harsh".

== Status ==
The IUCN has assessed the leaden antwren as being of Least Concern. It has a large range; its population size is not known and is believed to be decreasing. No immediate threats have been identified. It is considered very local in Colombia, uncommon in Peru, and fairly common in the rest of its range. "Human activity has little short-term direct effect on the Leaden Antwren [but in] the longer term, the Leaden Antwren potentially is vulnerable to widespread habitat loss, as might occur through perturbations of the Amazonian hydrological regime stemming from widespread deforestation, dam construction, or global climate change."
