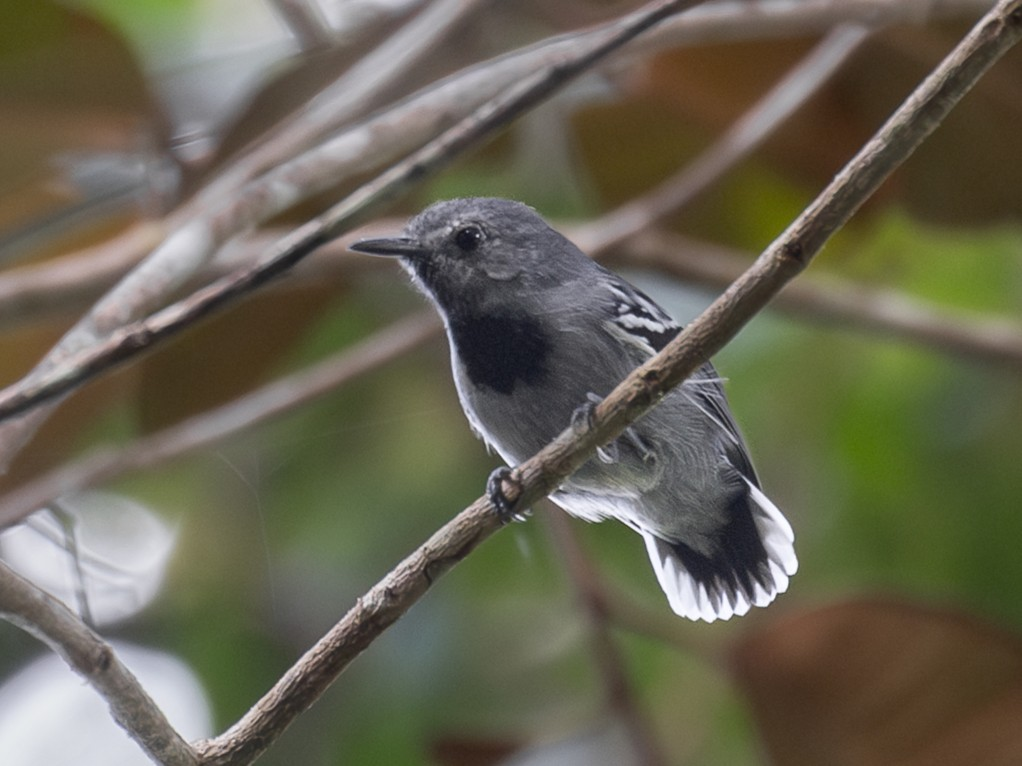
- male

Conservation status
- Vulnerable (IUCN 3.1)

Scientific classification
- Kingdom: Animalia
- Phylum: Chordata
- Class: Aves
- Order: Passeriformes
- Family: Thamnophilidae
- Genus: Myrmotherula
- Species: M. urosticta

Binomial name
- Myrmotherula urosticta (Sclater, PL, 1857)

= Band-tailed antwren =

Species of bird in Brazil

The band-tailed antwren (Myrmotherula urosticta) is a Vulnerable species of insectivorous bird in subfamily Thamnophilinae of family Thamnophilidae, the "typical antbirds". It is endemic to Brazil.

== Taxonomy and systematics ==
The band-tailed antwren was described by the English zoologist Philip Sclater in 1857 and given the binomial name Formicivora urosticta. The species is monotypic. The band-tailed antwren and the long-winged antwren (M. longipennis) form a superspecies.

== Description ==
The band-tailed antwren is 9 to 10 cm (3.5 to 3.9 in) long. It is a smallish bird with a short tail. Adult males have gray upperparts with a hidden white patch between the shoulders. Their wings are gray with white-tipped black coverts. Their tail is darker gray with the eponymous wide white band at the end. Their throat and upper breast are black; the rest of their underparts are a paler gray than the upperparts. Adult females have a paler gray face and upperparts than males with white-tipped gray wing coverts. Their throat is white, their sides and flanks gray, and the rest of their underparts pale cinnamon-buff.

== Distribution and habitat ==
The band-tailed antwren is a bird of the Atlantic Forest. It found very spottily and locally in coastal eastern Brazil between Bahia and northern Rio de Janeiro state. The largest numbers are found in the southern Bahia-northern Espírito Santo area. It inhabits the understorey to mid-storey of evergreen forest and adjacent mature secondary forest in the lowlands. It appears to favor tall forest on sandy soil, especially those with abundant vines in their lower reaches. In elevation it occurs below about 500 m (1,600 ft).

== Behavior ==
=== Movement ===
The band-tailed antwren is believed to be a year-round resident throughout its range.

=== Feeding ===
The band-tailed antwren's diet is not known in detail but is probably mostly insects and spiders. It forages singly, in pairs, or in family groups, and usually as part of a mixed-species feeding flock. It typically forages on fairly open leafy branches. It feeds mostly between about 3 and 10 m (10 and 30 ft) above the ground but will go as high as 20 m (70 ft), though rarely. It seeks prey mostly by gleaning live leaves, and also takes prey from clusters of dead leaves, vine tangles, and along branches by gleaning, reaching, lunging, and with short sallies from a perch.

=== Breeding ===
Nothing is known about the band-tailed antwren's breeding biology.

=== Vocalization ===
The band-tailed antwren's song is a "short series of 4-5 very high, nasal, well-separated, sharply upslurred 'tjeuwi' notes". Its most common call is "three notes...dropping in pitch".

== Status ==
The IUCN originally in 1988 assessed the band-tailed antwren as Near Threatened, then in 1994 as Vulnerable, in 2000 as Endangered, and since 2004 again as Vulnerable. Its estimated population of between 2500 and 10,000 mature individuals is scattered and fragmented and is believed to be decreasing. The primary threat is habitat destruction. "Virtually all lowland Atlantic forest outside protected areas has been cleared within its historical range, and even some of the protected areas in which it occurs are not secure ". It is considered uncommon and local. Though it is known mostly from five protected areas in southern Bahia, "[s]ignificant portions of these reserves encompass habitat not suitable for this species, for which the effective protected area is therefore much smaller than it may seem".
