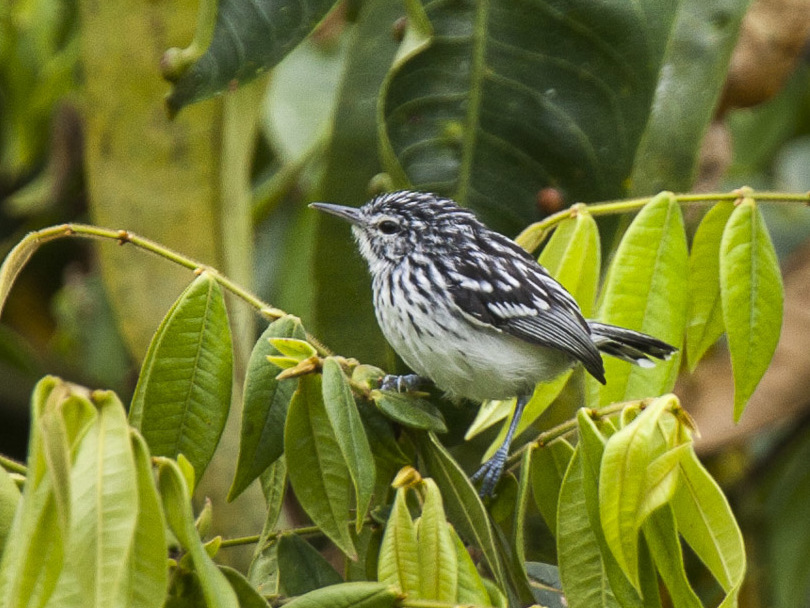

Conservation status
- Least Concern (IUCN 3.1)

Scientific classification
- Kingdom: Animalia
- Phylum: Chordata
- Class: Aves
- Order: Passeriformes
- Family: Thamnophilidae
- Genus: Myrmotherula
- Species: M. longicauda

Binomial name
- Myrmotherula longicauda Berlepsch & Stolzmann, 1894

Audio
- Stripe-chested antwren song

= Stripe-chested antwren =

Species of bird

The stripe-chested antwren (Myrmotherula longicauda) is a species of bird in the subfamily Thamnophilinae of the family Thamnophilidae. It is found in Bolivia, Colombia, Ecuador, and Peru.

== Taxonomy and systematics ==
The stripe-chested antwren has these four subspecies:

- Myrmotherula longicauda soderstromi Gyldenstolpe, 1930
- Myrmotherula longicauda pseudoaustralis Gyldenstolpe, 1930
- Myrmotherula longicauda longicauda Berlepsch & Stolzmann, 1894
- Myrmotherula longicauda australis Chapman, 1923

Gyldenstolpe treated subspecies M. l. australis as a separate species but that treatment was not otherwise accepted.

== Description ==
The stripe-chested antwren is 9 to 11 cm (3.5 to 4.3 in) long and weighs 8 to 9.5 g (0.28 to 0.34 oz). It is a smallish bird with a somewhat longer tail than other members of its genus. Adult males have a black and white streaked face and neck. Their crown, back, and rump are black with white or pale gray streaks. Their tail is black with white edges and tips to the feathers. Their wings are black with wide white edges on the coverts and narrower white edges on the flight feathers. Their throat, breast, and belly are white with light black streaks on the breast and flanks. Adult females have buff streaks (not white) on the face, head, and upperparts. Their wing coverts have white or buff edges. Their underparts are buff that is much paler on the throat and belly than the breast. The sides of the breast have a small amount of pale gray streaking. The species' iris is dark brown, its maxilla black, dark gray, or bluish gray, its mandible gray to bluish gray, and its legs and feet gray to bluish gray. The plumage differences among the subspecies are subtle and "not entirely clear".

== Distribution and habitat ==
The stripe-chested antwren is found in a disjunct distribution along the eastern slope of the Andes. The subspecies are distributed thus:

- Myrmotherula longicauda soderstromi: southern Colombia's Putumayo Department south and northern Ecuador's Napo Province
- Myrmotherula longicauda pseudoaustralis: from southern Ecuador's Morona-Santiago Province south into Peru as far as the Department of Pasco; also separately in Peru's Department of Loreto
- Myrmotherula longicauda longicauda: Peru's Department of Junín
- Myrmotherula longicauda australis: from Cusco and Madre de Dios departments in southern Peru south into northwestern Bolivia as far as Cochabamba Department

In most of its range the stripe-chested antwren inhabits the edges of humid evergreen forest and also secondary forest and bamboo stands. In elevation it ranges between 400 and 1,550 m (1,300 and 5,100 ft) though only as high as 1,100 m (3,600 ft) in Colombia and mostly below 1,000 m (3,300 ft) in Ecuador. The disjunct population in Loreto, Peru, inhabits permanently flooded forest around blackwater lakes at an elevation of about 150 m (500 ft).

== Behavior ==
=== Movement ===
The stripe-chested antwren is believed to be a year-round resident throughout its range.

=== Feeding ===
The stripe-chested antwren's diet has not been studied in detail but is known to include insects and spiders. It typically forages singly or in pairs and seldom joins mixed-species feeding flocks. It mostly feeds in dense foliage in the forest's mid-levels 2 to 8 m (7 to 26 ft) above the ground, though it will descend almost to the ground and ascend as high as 15 m (50 ft). It actively seeks prey among leaves and vine tangles and along branches, gleaning by reaching, lunging, and with brief sallies from a perch.

=== Breeding ===
Nothing is known about the stripe-chested antwren's breeding biology.

=== Vocalization ===
One description of the stripe-chested antwren's song is "a fast repetition of a musical phrase, 'chidu-chidu-chidu-chidu...' with up to 12 or so notes". Its call is "a doubled note followed by a short descending trill, 'chiwi-chrrrrrrt' ". Other descriptions of its song and calls are respectively "a slow, even-paced, monotone series of musical couplets: tee-tip tee-tip tee-tip tee-tip tee-tip" and "a descending tew, quiet sick-sick notes, and ringing, harsh rattle".

== Status ==
The IUCN has assessed the stripe-chested antwren as being of Least Concern. It has a fairly large range; its population size is not known and is believed to be decreasing. No immediate threats have been identified. It is considered fairly common in Peru, "[l]ocally not uncommon" in Ecuador, and "[l]ocal and rare" in Colombia. "Although the Stripe-chested Antwren occupies habitats, such as forest edge, that often result from natural disturbance, it is vulnerable to large-scale habitat loss; the lower slopes of the Andes, where this species occurs, long have been favored for agriculture."
