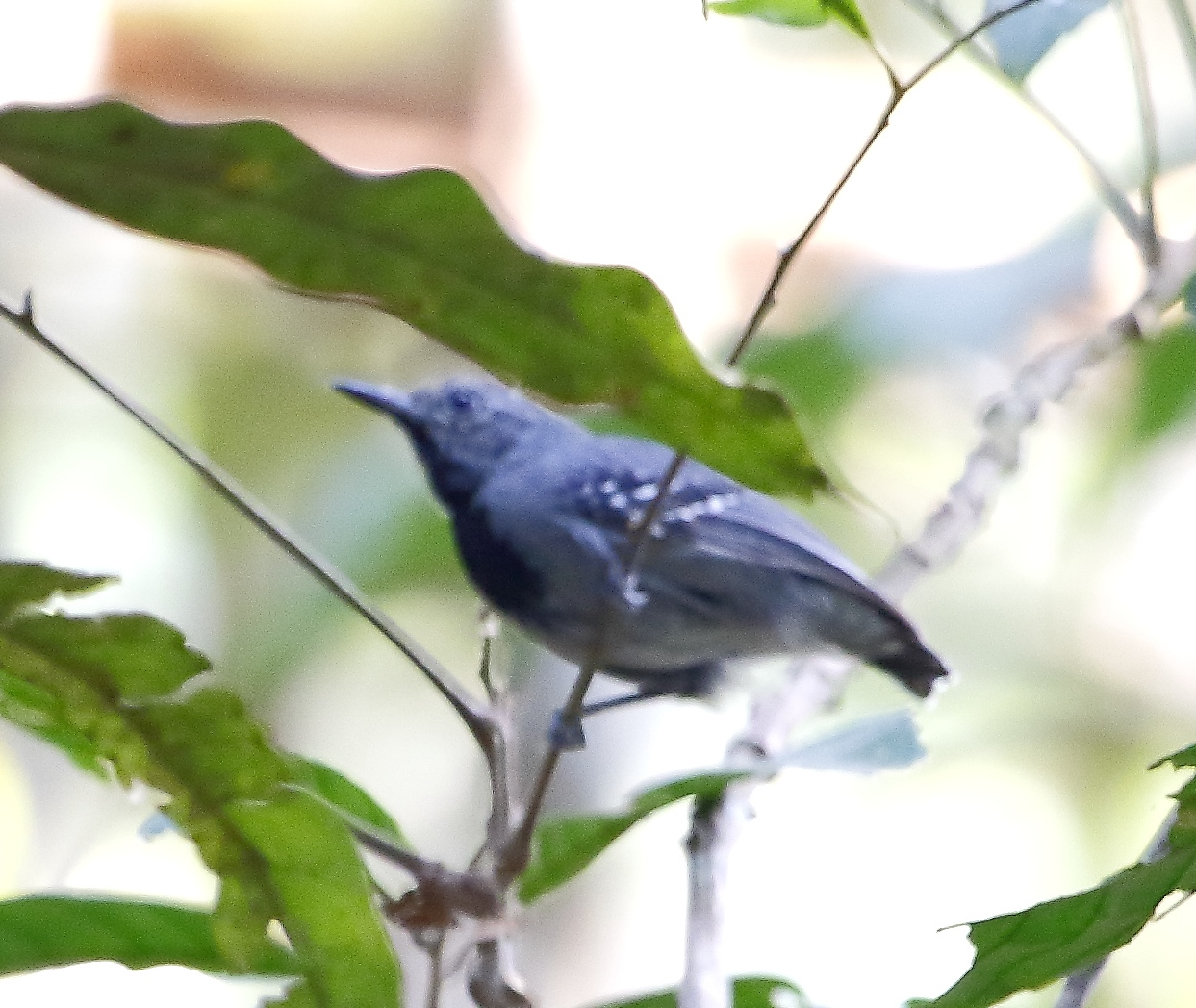

Conservation status
- Least Concern (IUCN 3.1)

Scientific classification
- Kingdom: Animalia
- Phylum: Chordata
- Class: Aves
- Order: Passeriformes
- Family: Thamnophilidae
- Genus: Myrmotherula
- Species: M. longipennis

Binomial name
- Myrmotherula longipennis Pelzeln, 1868

= Long-winged antwren =

Species of bird

The long-winged antwren (Myrmotherula longipennis) is a species of bird in subfamily Thamnophilinae of family Thamnophilidae, the "typical antbirds". It is found in Bolivia, Brazil, Colombia, Ecuador, French Guiana, Guyana, Peru, Suriname, and Venezuela.

== Taxonomy and systematics ==
The long-winged antwren was described by the Austrian ornithologist August von Pelzeln in 1868 and given its current binomial name Myrmotherula longipennis.

The long-winged antwren has these six subspecies:

- M. l. longipennis Pelzeln, 1868
- M. l. zimmeri Chapman, 1925
- M. l. garbei Ihering, HFA, 1905
- M. l. transitiva Hellmayr, 1929
- M. l. ochrogyna Todd, 1927
- M. l. paraensis (Todd, 1920)

Some authors have suggested that some subspecies deserve to be treated as separate species, and M. l. garbei was so treated by one early 20th century author. The long-winged antwren and the band-tailed antwren (M. urosticta) form a superspecies.

== Description ==
The long-winged antwren is 9 to 10.5 cm (3.5 to 4.1 in) long and weighs 8 to 10 g (0.28 to 0.35 oz). It is a smallish bird with a short tail. Adult males of the nominate subspecies M. l. longipennis have dark gray upperparts with a hidden white patch between the shoulders and white tips on the scapulars. Their wings are dark gray with white-tipped black coverts. Their tail is gray with white tips on the feathers. Their throat and upper breast are black; the rest of their underparts are a paler gray than the upperparts. Adult females have an ochraceous face, olive-brown upperparts, and dark grayish brown tail and wings. Their wing coverts and flight feathers have deep cinnamon edges. Their throat and breast are light buff. The rest of their underparts are mostly white with a gray tinge; their flanks are light gray with an olive tinge. Subadult males are like adult females with some light gray on the lower back and rump.

Males of the other subspecies of the long-winged antwren all have white tips on their facial feathers, and more black on the breast and slightly paler though variable underparts than the nominate. Females differ from the nominate and each other thus:

- M. l. zimmeri: pinkish buff face, olive-tinged gray crown and upperparts, dark gray tail, cinnamon-tinged white edges on flight feathers, pale cinnamon tips on wing coverts, and deep cinnamon underparts
- M. l. garbei: more olivaceous upperparts than zimmeri, with paler face, olive-buff wing covert tips, and warm buff underparts
- M. l. transitiva: pale cinnamon-buff face, rufescent cast on upperparts, and light buff underparts with brownish shade on flanks
- M. l. ochrogyna: buff-brown face, rufous-brown crown and upperparts, brown tail, and ochraceous underparts
- M. l. paraensis: cinnamon-buff face, brownish olive upperparts and edges of wings and tail feathers, and bright cinnamon-buff underparts

== Distribution and habitat ==
The subspecies of the long-winged antwren are found thus:

- M. l. longipennis: southeastern Colombia, extreme northeastern Ecuador north of the Rio Napo, extreme northern Peru north of the rios Napo and Amazon, southern Venezuela, the Guianas, and northern Brazil north of the Amazon east to Amapá
- M. l. zimmeri: eastern Ecuador south of the Rio Napo and northeastern Peru south of the Rio Napo and north of the rios Amazon and Marañón
- M. l. garbei: eastern Peru south of the rios Amazon and Marañón, northwestern Bolivia, and Brazil south of the Amazon east to the Rio Madeira
- M. l. transitiva: Brazil south of the Amazon between the upper Rio Madeira and upper Rio Tapajós
- M. l. ochrogyna: Brazil south of the Amazon between the lower Rio Madeira and lower Rio Tapajós
- M. l. paraensis: Brazil south of the Amazon between the Rio Tapajós and western Maranhão, and south into northeastern Mato Grosso

The long-winged antwren inhabits the understorey to mid-storey of evergreen forest and mature secondary forest in the lowlands and foothills. It occurs primarily in terra firme forest and also in várzea, igapó, and transitional forest types. In elevation it occurs below 500 m (1,600 ft) in Colombia and Ecuador, up to 700 m (2,300 ft) in other lowlands, to 900 m (3,000 ft) in the Andean foothills, and to 1,100 m (3,600 ft) on the Venezuelan tepuis.

== Behavior ==
=== Movement ===
The long-winged antwren is believed to be a year-round resident throughout its range.

=== Feeding ===
The long-winged antwren's diet is mostly insects and spiders. It forages singly, in pairs, or in family groups, and usually as part of a mixed-species feeding flock. It typically forages in dense vegetation mostly between about 2 and 8 m (7 and 30 ft) above the ground but will go as low as 1 m (3 ft) and as high as 14 m (50 ft). It forages mostly along thin and fairly open branches of understorey trees, especially those with larger leaves. It mostly gleans prey from live foliage and also takes prey from clusters of dead leaves, vine tangles, and along branches by gleaning, reaching, lunging, and with short sallies from a perch.

=== Breeding ===
The long-winged antwren's breeding season has not been defined, but where it is known includes August to December. Its known nests were a deep cup of fungal fibers covered with dead leaves; they were hung from a branch at various heights above the ground up to about 12 m (40 ft). Both sexes provision nestlings. The clutch size, incubation period, time to fledging, and other details of parental care are not known.

=== Vocalization ===
The songs of the long-winged antwren subspecies differ, though the differences between adjoining ones are slight to moderate. The nominate subspecies' song is "a series of harsh upslurred notes...initially gains in intensity but nearly constant in pitch and pace" like "high, nasal 'suee' notes". The songs of M. l. zimmeri and M. l. garbei are "a deliberate series...each note dropping and then rising in pitch...while entire series rises in pitch" like "chuwey-chuwey-chuwey-chuwee-chuwee-chuwee". The songs of the other three subspecies vary slightly but generally are "a rapidly delivered series of abrupt downslurred notes that shorten slightly in length, mostly on same pitch except last notes rise". The most common call is "2–6 whistles, dropping in pitch, the number and length of notes variable among races and individuals".

== Status ==
The IUCN has assessed the long-winged antwren as being of Least Concern. It has a very large range, and though its population size is not known it is believed to be stable. No immediate threats have been identified. It is considered fairly common throughout its range. It occurs in many large protected areas, and "there are vast areas of contiguous appropriate habitat which are not formally protected, but which appear to be under relatively little threat of development in immediate future".
