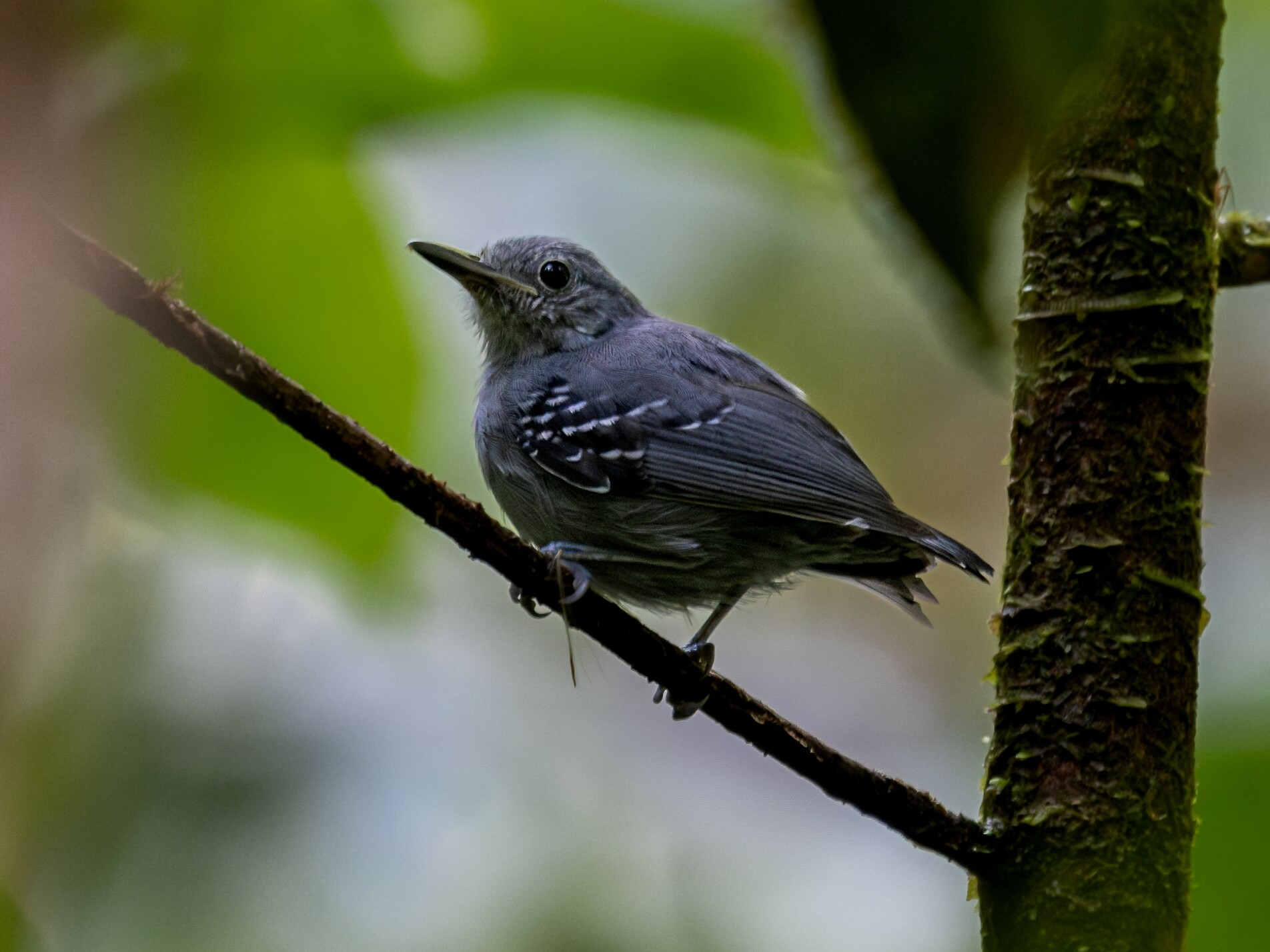
- Male at Serra do Navio, Amapá, Brazil
- Grey antwren song

Conservation status
- Least Concern (IUCN 3.1)

Scientific classification
- Kingdom: Animalia
- Phylum: Chordata
- Class: Aves
- Order: Passeriformes
- Family: Thamnophilidae
- Genus: Myrmotherula
- Species: M. menetriesii

Binomial name
- Myrmotherula menetriesii (d'Orbigny, 1837)

= Grey antwren =

Species of bird

The grey antwren (Myrmotherula menetriesii) is a species of bird in subfamily Thamnophilinae of family Thamnophilidae, the "typical antbirds". It is found in Bolivia, Brazil, Colombia, Ecuador, French Guiana, Guyana, Peru, Suriname, and Venezuela.

== Taxonomy and systematics ==
The grey-throated antwren has these five subspecies:

- M. m. pallida Berlepsch & Hartert, EJO, 1902
- M. m. cinereiventris Sclater, PL & Salvin, 1868
- M. m. menetriesii (d'Orbigny, 1837)
- M. m. berlepschi Hellmayr, 1903
- M. m. omissa Todd, 1927

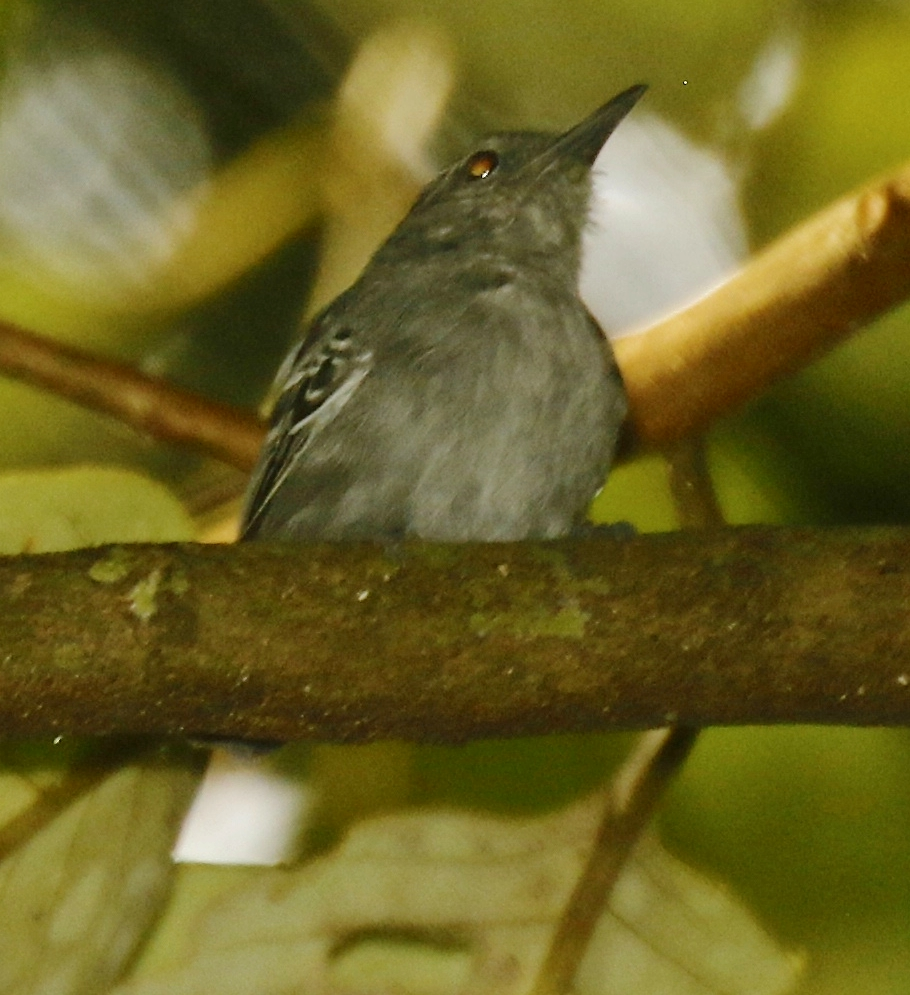
At Sani Lodge, Ecuador (flash photo)

== Description ==
The grey antwren is 8.5 to 10.5 cm (3.3 to 4.1 in) long and weighs 8 to 9 g (0.28 to 0.32 oz). It is a smallish bird with a short tail. Adult males of the nominate subspecies M. m. menetriesii are almost entirely bluish gray, with lighter underparts than upperparts. Their wing coverts have white tips and a black bar just above them. Their tail feathers have narrow white tips. The center of their throat and upper breast are black, sometimes with gray tips on the throat feathers. Adult females have olive-tinged gray upperparts with somewhat darker wings. Their throat is buff and the rest of their underparts rich olive-buff. Juveniles look like a darker version of the adult female. Subadult males have a buff tinge on the wings, gray and pale buff patches on the breast, buff-tinged olive sides and flanks, and a buff crissum.

Males of subspecies M. m. berlepschi are similar to the nominate but less bluish, and with a blackish band near the end of the tail. Females' upperparts are more cinnamon-rufous and their underparts a richer tawny-ochraceous than the nominate's; they have cinnamon edges on the flight feathers. Males of M. m. cinereiventris have a gray throat and breast with at most a few black spots on the latter. Females have brownish olive upperparts. Males of M. m. omissa are like cinereiventris males; females have yellow-ochre underparts. Males of M. m. pallida are a paler version of cinereiventris and omissa but with a whitish crissum. Females are similar to the nominate.

== Distribution and habitat ==
The subspecies of the grey antwren are found thus:

- M. m. pallida: southwestern Venezuela and northwestern Brazil north of the Amazon south through eastern Colombia and eastern Ecuador into northeastern Peru north of the Amazon and Marañón rivers
- M. m. cinereiventris: southeastern Venezuela east through the Guianas and northeastern Brazil to the Atlantic
- M. m. menetriesii: east-central and southeastern Peru south of the Amazon and Marañón, northwestern Bolivia south to Santa Cruz Department, and southwestern Brazil
- M. m. berlepschi: extreme north-central and northeastern Bolivia and Brazil south of the Amazon between the Madeira and Tapajós rivers south to Rondônia
- M. m. omissa: Brazil south of the Amazon from the Tapajós east into western Maranhão

The grey antwren inhabits the mid-storey to subcanopy of terra firme and transitional lowland evergreen forest. In Brazil it ranges from near sea level to 1,000 m (3,300 ft) and reaches that elevation locally elsewhere. In Colombia it occurs mostly below 500 m (1,600 ft) and in Ecuador mostly below 600 m (2,000 ft).

== Behavior ==
=== Movement ===
The grey antwren is believed to be a year-round resident throughout its range.

=== Feeding ===
The grey antwren's diet is mostly insects and spiders. It forages singly, in pairs, or in family groups, and almost always as part of a mixed-species feeding flock. It feeds mostly between about 6 and 20 m (20 and 70 ft) above the ground though sometimes as low as 3 m (10 ft) and as high as 25 m (80 ft). It very actively, almost frenetically, seeks prey mostly on live leaves and also from vines, stems, and branches, by reaching, hanging, lunging, and occasionally by fluttering up from a perch.

=== Breeding ===
The grey antwren's breeding season is not known but appears to vary geographically. Observations show that it includes February in Colombia and Venezuela, December in French Guiana, and July in Bolivia. Its nest is a bundle or ball of dead leaves in the fork of a branch. The clutch size, incubation period, time to fledging, and details of parental care are not known.

=== Vocalization ===
The grey antwren's song in Brazil is described as an "ascending series of 6-8 eerie, two-syllabled 'wueeih' notes". In Ecuador it is "a wavering series of 10-12 'ree' or 'shree' notes that rise in pitch and accelerate a bit". The species' calls are "multi-noted [and] include higher-pitched abrupt notes and lower, slightly longer ones in varying combinations"; all are delivered rapidly.

== Status ==
The IUCN has assessed the grey antwren as being of Least Concern. It has an extremely large range; its population size is not known and is believed to be decreasing. No immediate threats have been identified. It is considered fairly common to common throughout its range. It occurs in many protected areas and "there are vast areas of contiguous appropriate habitat which, while not formally protected, appear to be under little threat of development in the near future".
