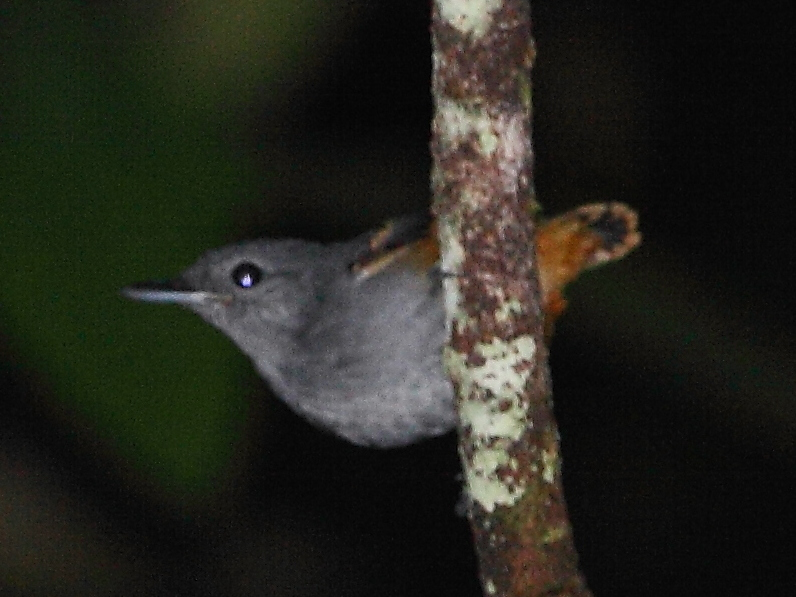
- Rufous-bellied antwren (Isleria guttata)

Scientific classification
- Kingdom: Animalia
- Phylum: Chordata
- Class: Aves
- Order: Passeriformes
- Family: Thamnophilidae
- Genus: Isleria; Bravo, Chesser & Brumfield, 2012

Type species
- Myrmothera guttata Vieillot, 1824

Species
- I. guttata I. hauxwelli

= Isleria =

Genus of birds

Isleria is a genus of insectivorous birds in the antbird family, Thamnophilidae.

== Species ==
The genus contains two species:

Male	Female	Scientific name	Common name	Distribution
		Isleria guttata	Rufous-bellied antwren	Brazil, French Guiana, Guyana, Suriname, and Venezuela.
		Isleria hauxwelli	Plain-throated antwren	Amazon Basin

These species were formerly placed in the genus Myrmotherula. A molecular genetic study published in 2012 found that Myrmotherula was not monophyletic. As a step in creating monophyletic genera, these two species were moved to the newly erected genus Isleria. The name of the genus was chosen to honour the American ornithologists Morton and Phyllis Isler.
