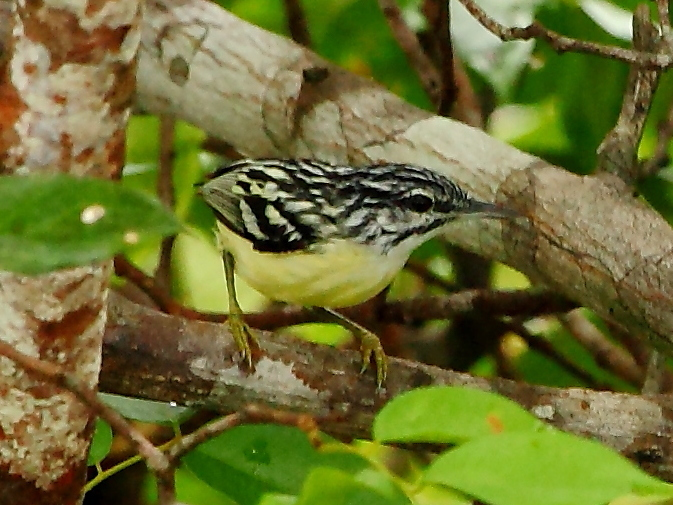
- at Manaus, Amazonas state, Brazil

Conservation status
- Least Concern (IUCN 3.1)]

Scientific classification
- Kingdom: Animalia
- Phylum: Chordata
- Class: Aves
- Order: Passeriformes
- Family: Thamnophilidae
- Genus: Myrmotherula
- Species: M. brachyura

Binomial name
- Myrmotherula brachyura (Hermann, 1783)

= Pygmy antwren =

Species of bird

The pygmy antwren (Myrmotherula brachyura) is a species of bird in subfamily Thamnophilinae of family Thamnophilidae, the "typical antbirds". It is found in Bolivia, Brazil, Colombia, Ecuador, French Guiana, Guyana, Peru, Suriname, and Venezuela.

== Taxonomy and systematics ==
The pygmy antwren is monotypic. It previously had two subspecies, but in the 21st century one of them was treated as a separate species by some authors and currently (2024) by worldwide taxonomic systems as one of two subspecies of the moustached antwren (M. ignota).

== Description ==
The pygmy antwren is 7.5 to 8.5 cm (3.0 to 3.3 in) long and weighs 6 to 8 g (0.21 to 0.28 oz). It is a small bird with a tiny tail. Adult males have a black streak through the eye, white cheeks, and a thin black "moustache". Their crown, back, rump, and tail are black with thin white streaks that are faintly yellow except on the crown. They have a white patch between the shoulders. Their wings are black with white tips on the coverts and white edges on the flight feathers. Their throat is white and the rest of their underparts are yellow with sparse black streaks on the sides. Adult females have a buff tinge on the cheeks and crown stripes. They lack the white patch between the shoulders, and in the northern part of their range have a pale buff throat and breast.

== Distribution and habitat ==
The pygmy antwren is a bird of the Amazon Basin. It is found from central and eastern Colombia east through southern Venezuela, the Guianas, and Brazil to the Atlantic and south through eastern Ecuador and eastern Peru into northern Bolivia and in Brazil to Mato Grosso state. It inhabits the canopy and subcanopy of lowland evergreen forest of several types including terra firme, várzea, and transitional forests. It also occurs in secondary forest. The species favors forest edges and the edges of openings provided by fallen trees. In elevation the species generally occurs below 600 m (2,000 ft) but reaches 800 m (2,600 ft) in Colombia and 900 m (3,000 ft) in Brazil.

== Behavior ==
=== Movement ===
The pygmy antwren is believed to be a year-round resident throughout its range.

=== Feeding ===
The pygmy antwren feeds on arthropods, especially insects and probably also spiders. It typically forages singly, in pairs, or in family groups and sometimes briefly joins mixed-species feeding flocks that pass through its territory. It forages in the forest's mid-storey to the canopy, typically between 8 and 25 m (30 and 80 ft) up though sometimes lower. It actively seeks prey along thin branches and vines, and gleans from foliage, branches, and mosses. It occasionally flutters from a perch to capture prey in mid-air or by hover-gleaning.

=== Breeding ===
The pygmy antwren's breeding season has not been defined but appears to vary geographically. In various parts of its range breeding activity has been noted in January, June, and August. Nothing else is known about its breeding biology.

=== Vocalization ===
The pygmy antwren's song has been described as a "short, rising, accecelerating series of very high, sharp notes, at start well separated and gradually changing to a descending rattle/trill". It has been written as "chree-chree-chree-chee-chee-ee-ee-ee-ee-rrr". Its calls include a "high, falling 'mew'", "various trilled contact calls", and "short whistles repeated irregularly, a short, rapid musical trill (variable, often slowing and falling in pitch), and abrupt chip, sometimes strung into a rattle".

== Status ==
The IUCN has assessed the pygmy antwren as being of Least Concern. It has an extremely large range, and though its population size is not known it is believed to be stable. No immediate threats have been identified. It is considered fairly common throughout its range and occurs in protected areas in most of the countries it inhabits. "The species' range also contains extensive, intact habitat which, although not formally protected, appears to be at little short-term risk of development."
