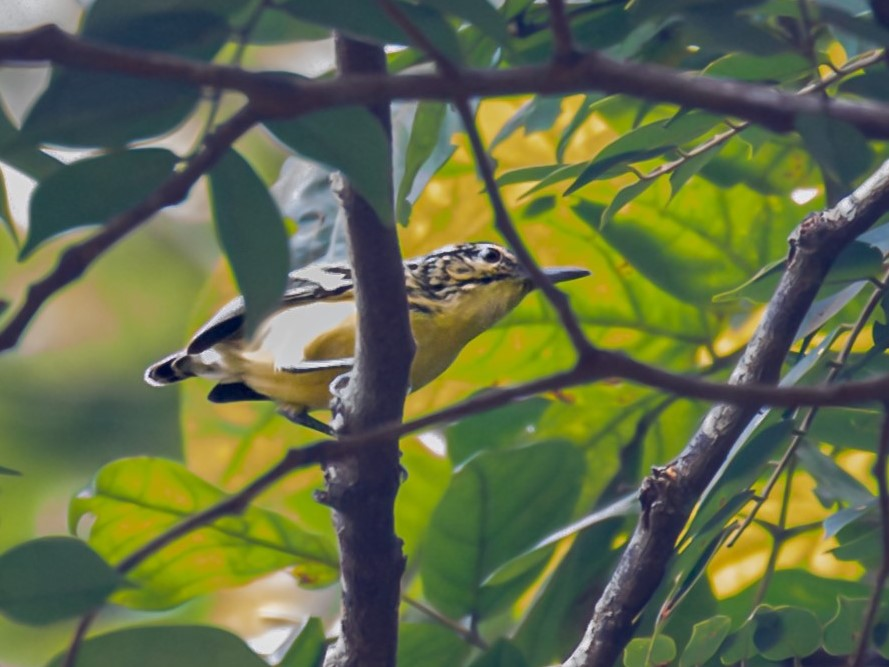

Conservation status
- Least Concern (IUCN 3.1)

Scientific classification
- Kingdom: Animalia
- Phylum: Chordata
- Class: Aves
- Order: Passeriformes
- Family: Thamnophilidae
- Genus: Myrmotherula
- Species: M. sclateri

Binomial name
- Myrmotherula sclateri Snethlage, 1912

= Sclater's antwren =

Species of bird

Sclater's antwren (Myrmotherula sclateri) is a species of bird in subfamily Thamnophilinae of family Thamnophilidae, the "typical antbirds". It is found in Bolivia, Brazil, and Peru.

== Taxonomy and systematics ==
Sclater's antwren is monotypic. It and the yellow-throated antwren (M. ambigua) form a superspecies. The yellow-throated antwren's original author considered them likely to be conspecific but that treatment has not gained acceptance.

The English name and specific epithet of Sclater's antwren commemorate the British zoologist Philip Lutley Sclater.

== Description ==
Sclater's antwren is 8 to 8.5 cm (3.1 to 3.3 in) long and weighs 8 to 10 g (0.28 to 0.35 oz). It is a smallish bird with a short tail. Adult males have a black and white streaked face and neck with yellow cheeks and a wide black "moustache". Their crown is black with light yellow streaks; the rest of their upperparts are black with whitish streaks. They have a light yellow patch between the shoulders. Their tail is black with white edges and tips to the feathers. Their wings are black with wide white edges on the coverts and narrower white edges on the flight feathers. Their throat and breast are yellow and the rest of their underparts paler; there are a few black streaks on the side of the breast. Adult females have somewhat more ochraceous streaks on the face, head, and upperparts than males. They do not have the male's patch between the shoulders. Their underparts have more streaks than the male's.

== Distribution and habitat ==
Sclater's antwren is found in the upper Amazon Basin south of the Amazon River, in eastern Peru, northern Bolivia, and western Brazil east to the Xingu River and south to Mato Grosso state. It inhabits the mid-storey to canopy of lowland evergreen forest including terra firme, várzea, and transitional types. It tends to favor the forest interior rather than its edges. In elevation it ranges up to about 550 m (1,800 ft).

== Behavior ==
=== Movement ===
Sclater's antwren is believed to be a year-round resident throughout its range.

=== Feeding ===
The diet of Sclater's antwren has not been detailed but is known to include insects and probably spiders. It typically forages in pairs or family groups and almost always as part of a mixed-species feeding flock. It mostly feeds in dense foliage in or just below the forest canopy at least 15 m (50 ft) up. It actively seeks prey mostly by gleaning leaves, and also takes prey from vine tangles and along branches by gleaning, reaching, lunging, and hovering.

=== Breeding ===
The breeding season of Sclater's antwren is not known but dependent young have been observed in June. The species appears to have larger territories than many other antwrens but nothing else is known about its breeding biology.

=== Vocalization ===
The song of Sclater's antwren is a "short, slow series of 4-6 well-separated 'peuw' notes".

== Status ==
The IUCN has assessed Sclater's antwren as being of Least Concern. It has a very large range; its population size is not known and is believed to be decreasing. No immediate threats have been identified. It is considered fairly common throughout its range and occurs in several large protected areas. "In addition, extensive intact habitat remains which, although not formally protected, appears to be at little near-term risk of development."
