= Yellow-throated antwren =

Conservation status
- Least Concern (IUCN 3.1)

Scientific classification
- Kingdom: Animalia
- Phylum: Chordata
- Class: Aves
- Order: Passeriformes
- Family: Thamnophilidae
- Genus: Myrmotherula
- Species: M. ambigua

Binomial name
- Myrmotherula ambigua Zimmer, 1932

Species of bird

The yellow-throated antwren (Myrmotherula ambigua) is a species of bird in subfamily Thamnophilinae of family Thamnophilidae, the "typical antbirds". It is found in Brazil, Colombia, and Venezuela.

== Taxonomy and systematics ==
The yellow-throated antwren is monotypic. It and Sclater's antwren (M. sclateri) form a superspecies. The species' original author considered them likely to be conspecific but that treatment has not gained acceptance.

== Description ==
The yellow-throated antwren is 8 to 8.5 cm (3.1 to 3.3 in) long and weighs 7 to 8 g (0.25 to 0.28 oz). It is a smallish bird with a short tail. Adult males have a black and white streaked face and neck with whitish cheeks. Their crown and back are black with white streaks; their rump is grayish. They have a light yellow patch between the shoulders. Their tail is black with white edges and tips to the feathers. Their wings are black with wide white edges on the coverts and narrower white edges on the flight feathers. Their underparts are light yellow with some black streaks on the side. Adult females have tawny-buff to buff streaks (not white) on the face, head, and upperparts. They do not have the male's patch between the shoulders. Their underparts tend to tawny-buff to buff.

== Distribution and habitat ==
The yellow-throated antwren is found in southwestern Venezuela's Amazonas state, in extreme eastern Colombia's Guainía and Vaupés departments, and in Brazil in the upper basin of the Rio Negro. It inhabits the subcanopy and canopy of lowland evergreen forests of several types, typically those on white sand soil to mixed soils. In elevation it mostly occurs below 350 m (1,100 ft), though only to 200 m (700 ft) in Colombia and occasionally as high as about 1,100 m (3,600 ft) on tepuis.

== Behavior ==
=== Movement ===
The yellow-throated antwren is believed to be a year-round resident throughout its range.

=== Feeding ===
The yellow-throated antwren's diet has not been detailed but is known to include insects and probably spiders and other arthropods. It typically forages in pairs and almost always as part of a mixed-species feeding flock. It mostly feeds in dense foliage in or just below the forest canopy, even in stunted forest where the canopy is only about 15 m (50 ft) high. It actively seeks prey mostly by gleaning leaves, and also takes prey from vine tangles and along branches by gleaning, reaching, lunging, and hovering.

=== Breeding ===
Nothing is known about the yellow-throated antwren's breeding biology.

=== Vocalization ===
The yellow-throated antwren's song is a "monotone, slow, very high 'pew-pew--' ".

== Status ==
The IUCN has assessed the yellow-throated antwren as being of Least Concern. It has a somewhat restricted range, and though its population size is not known it is believed to be stable. No immediate threats have been idendified. It is considered local in Colombia and uncommon to common elsewhere. It occurs in several large protected areas and "vast contiguous areas of intact habitat which are not formally protected, but are under little or no current threat". Though there is illegal gold mining even in nominally protected areas, "the region in which this species occurs remains one of those that has been least affected by humans in South America".
