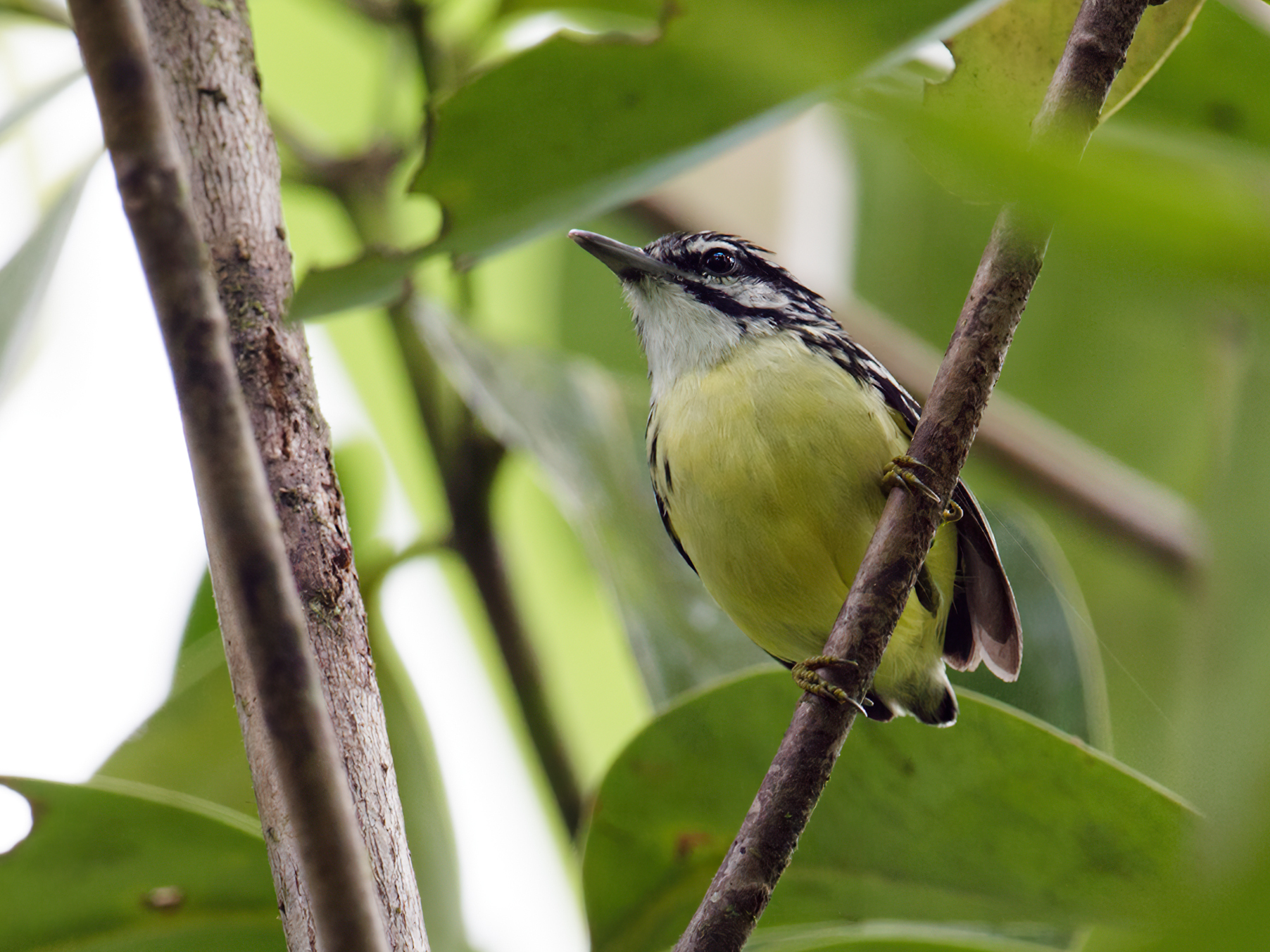

Conservation status
- Least Concern (IUCN 3.1)

Scientific classification
- Kingdom: Animalia
- Phylum: Chordata
- Class: Aves
- Order: Passeriformes
- Family: Thamnophilidae
- Genus: Myrmotherula
- Species: M. ignota

Binomial name
- Myrmotherula ignota Griscom, 1929

Audio

= Moustached antwren =

Species of bird found in South America

The moustached antwren (Myrmotherula ignota) is a species of small Neotropical bird in subfamily Thamnophilinae of family Thamnophilidae, the "typical antbirds". It is found in Brazil, Colombia, Ecuador, Panama, and Peru.

== Taxonomy and systematics ==
The moustached antwren has two subspecies, the nominate M. i. ignota (Griscom, 1929) and M. i. obscura (Zimmer, JT, 1932). M. i. ignota was originally treated as a subspecies of the pygmy antwren (M. brachyura) and later by some authors as a separate species, "Griscom's antwren". What is now M. i. obscura was treated as a monotypic species, the "short-billed antwren". Taxonomists now follow a 2003 publication that combined the two as the moustached antwren, which because of the principle of priority has the binomial Myrmotherula ignota.

== Description ==
The moustached antwren is 7.5 to 8 cm (3.0 to 3.1 in) long. It is a small bird with a tiny tail. Adult males of the nominate subspecies have the eponymous wide black "moustache", a black streak through the eye, and white cheeks. Their crown, back, rump, and tail are black with thin white streaks that are faintly yellow except on the crown. They have a white patch between the shoulders. Their wings are black with white tips on the coverts and white edges on the flight feathers. Their underparts are yellow with sparse black streaks. Adult females have buff to tawny buff streaks on the crown and lack the white patch between the shoulders. Males of subspecies M. i. obscura have fewer pale streaks on their upperparts than the nominate. Females have a buffier head, throat, and breast than the nominate.

== Distribution and habitat ==
The moustached antwren has a disjunct distribution. The nominate subspecies is found in Panama, on the Caribbean slope in the Panama Canal area and Guna Yala (San Blas) and on the Pacific slope from Panamá Province east. Its range continues into northern Colombia to Santander Department and through western Colombia into northwestern Ecuador as far as northwestern Pichincha Province. Subspecies M. i. obscura is found from south-central and southeastern Colombia south through eastern Ecuador into northeastern Peru and east into southwestern and west-central Brazil as far as the Rio Negro.

The moustached antwren primarily inhabits the canopy and subcanopy of lowland evergreen forest. The nominate subspecies also occurs in mature secondary forest. In the Amazon Basin M. i. obscura is found in both terra firme and várzea. In all areas the species favors forest edges, the edges of openings provided by fallen trees, and along watercourses. In elevation the species reaches 1,100 m (3,600 ft) in Panama, 1,000 m (3,300 ft) in Colombia, and 600 m (2,000 ft) elsewhere.

== Behavior ==
=== Movement ===
The moustached antwren is believed to be a year-round resident throughout its range.

=== Feeding ===
The moustached antwren feeds on arthropods, especially insects and including spiders. It typically forages singly, in pairs, or in family groups and sometimes joins mixed-species feeding flocks. It forages in the forest's mid-storey to the canopy, typically between 10 and 40 m (30 and 130 ft) up. It actively seeks prey along thin branches and vines, and gleans from foliage, branches, and mosses. It occasionally flutters from a perch to capture prey in mid-air or by hover-gleaning.

=== Breeding ===
One moustached antwren nest in Peru was a pouch of lichen and spiderweb suspended from a fork in slender twigs; it was observed under construction by both members of a pair in August. Nothing else is known about the species' breeding biology.

=== Vocalization ===
The moustached antwren's song is "an accelerating series of short notes increasing and then decreasing in pitch and intensity". Its call is "a short, uneven, downslurred whistle", and M. i. obscura also makes "an abrupt note".

== Status ==
The IUCN has assessed the moustached antwren as being of Least Concern. It has a very large range; its population size is not known and is believed to be decreasing. No immediate threats have been identified. It is considered uncommon to fairly common throughout its range and occurs in several protected areas. "Much of this species' range has been little affected by human disturbance to date, although intensified oil exploration and concomitant road-building and human colonization in much of E Ecuador, along with completion of the Pan-American highway in Panama-Colombia, pose potential future threats."
