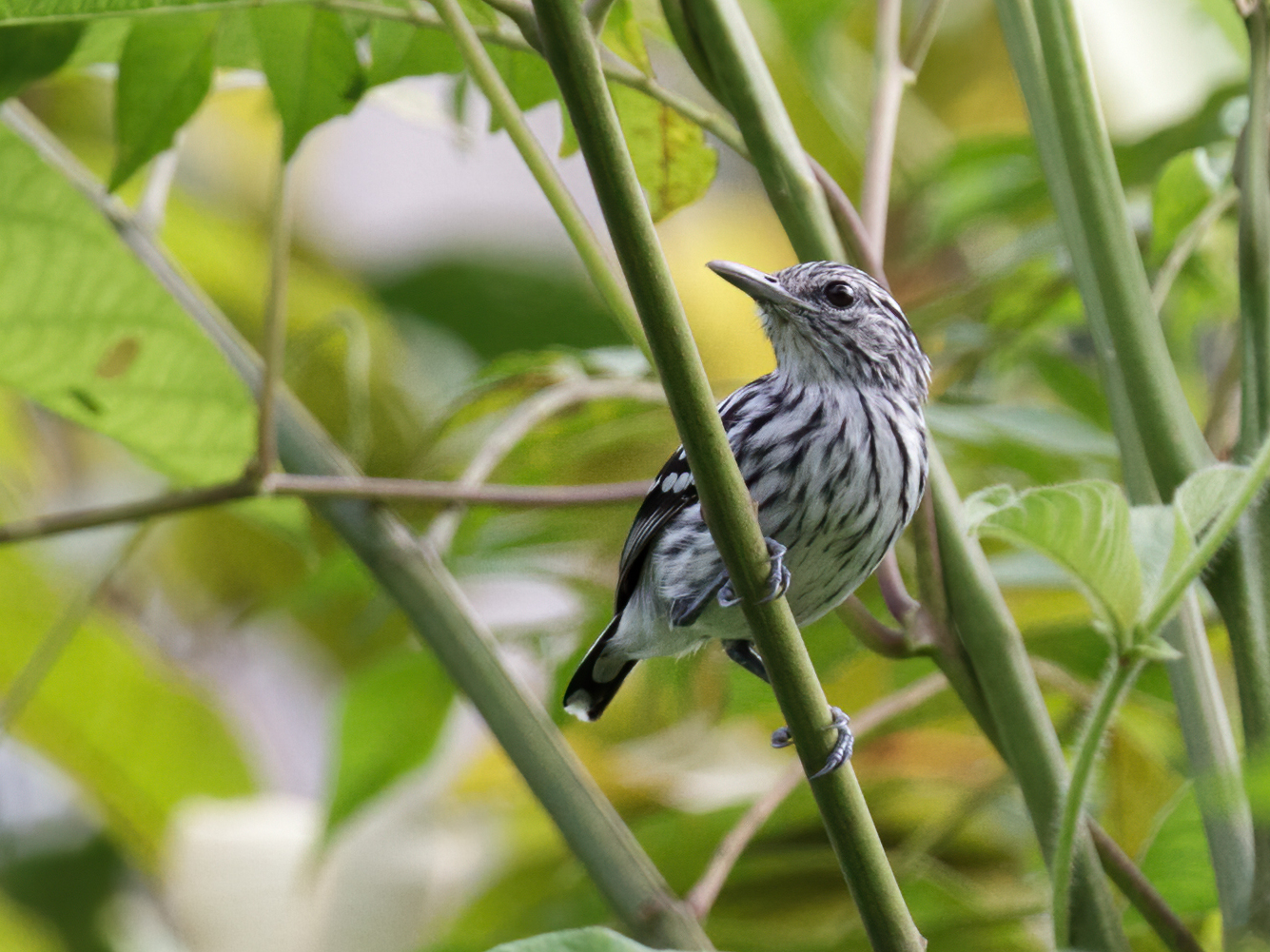

Conservation status
- Least Concern (IUCN 3.1)

Scientific classification
- Kingdom: Animalia
- Phylum: Chordata
- Class: Aves
- Order: Passeriformes
- Family: Thamnophilidae
- Genus: Myrmotherula
- Species: M. pacifica

Binomial name
- Myrmotherula pacifica Hellmayr, 1911

= Pacific antwren =

Species of bird

The Pacific antwren or Pacific streaked antwren (Myrmotherula pacifica) is a species of bird in subfamily Thamnophilinae of family Thamnophilidae, the "typical antbirds". It is found in Colombia, Ecuador and Panama.

== Taxonomy and systematics ==
The Pacific antwren was first described in 1911 by the Austrian ornithologist Carl Eduard Hellmayr. It was at one time considered to be conspecific with what are now the Guianan streaked antwren (M. surinamensis) and the Amazonian streaked antwren (M. multostriata) as the "streaked antwren". Differences in their plumage and voice indicate that they are separate species. The Pacific antwren is monotypic: No subspecies are recognized.

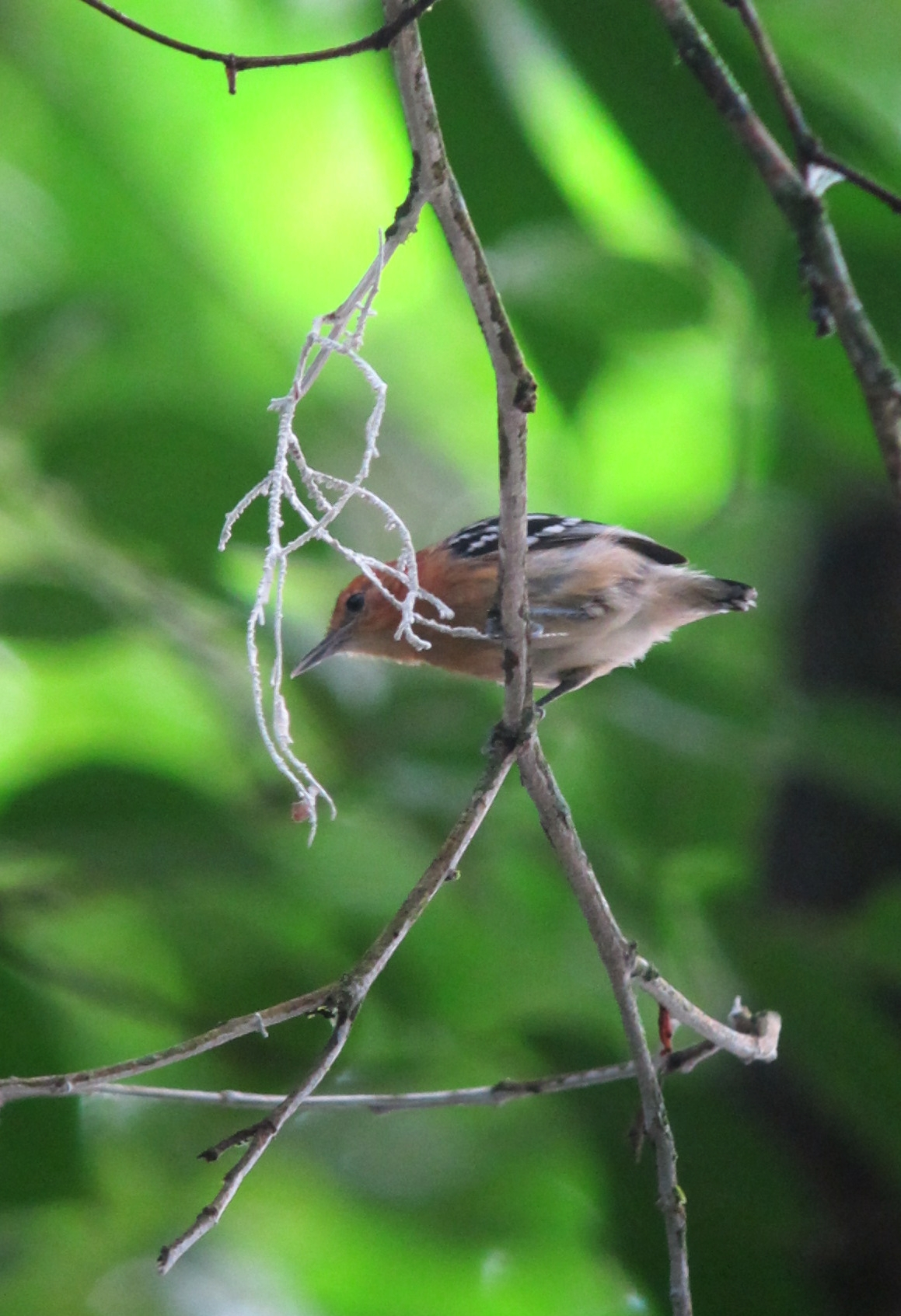
A female bird

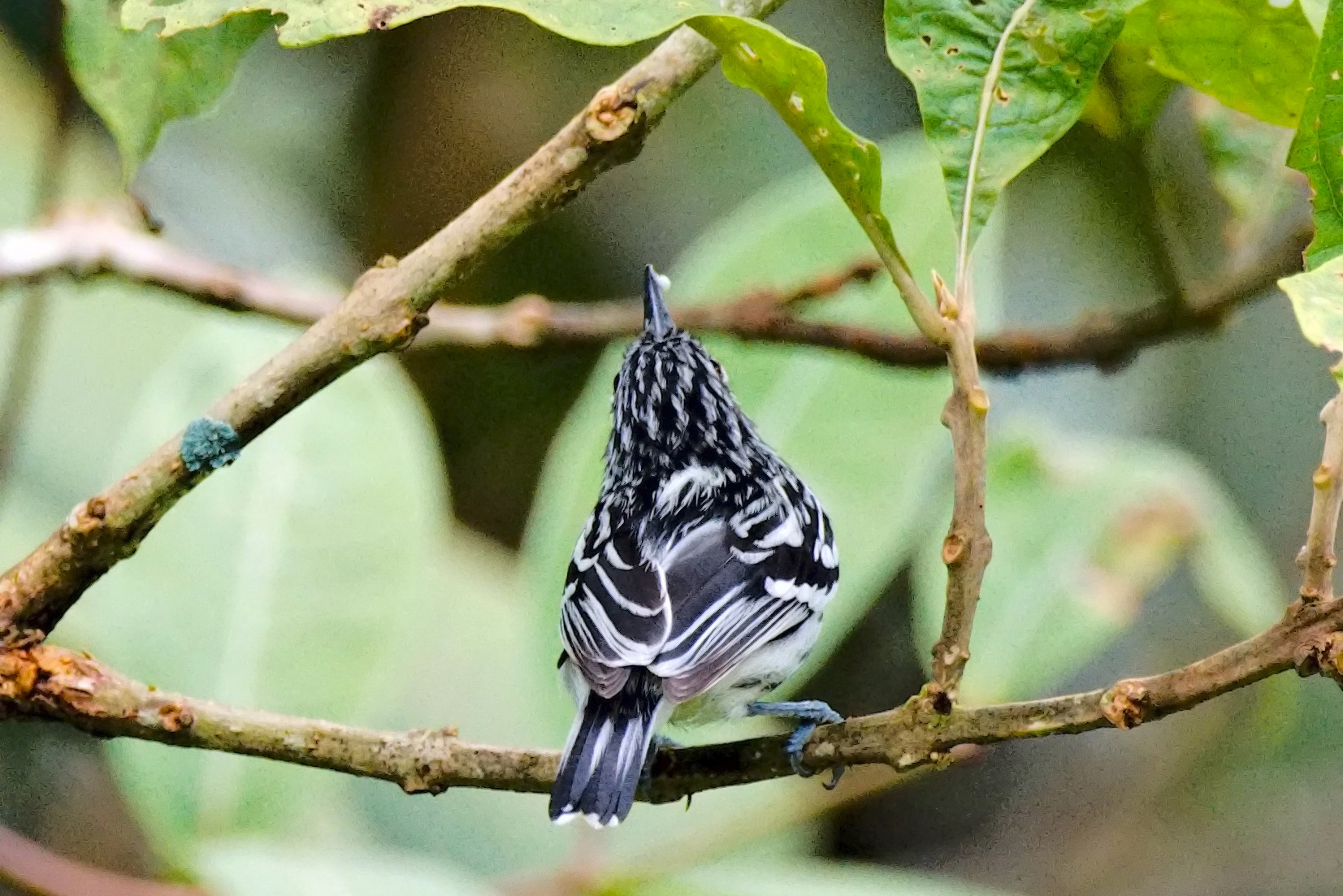
Pacific antwren from the back

== Description ==
The Pacific antwren is 9 to 10 cm (3.5 to 3.9 in) long and weighs 8.5 to 10 g (0.30 to 0.35 oz). It is a smallish bird with a tiny tail. Adult males have a black and white streaked face. Their crown, back, and rump are black with white streaks. They have a narrow white patch between the shoulders. Their tail is black with white edges and tips to the feathers. Their wings are black with white tips on the coverts and white edges on the flight feathers. Their throat, breast, and belly are white and their flanks and crissum grayer. Black streaks extend from the throat to the flanks and belly. Adult females have a buff to cinnamon-rufous face, crown, nape, and shoulders with black streaks on the crown and nape. They lack the white patch between the shoulders. Their throat and the center of their belly are pale buff and the rest of their underparts orange-ochre; their underparts have no streaks.

== Distribution and habitat ==
The Pacific antwren is found on both the Caribbean and Pacific slopes of Panama into Colombia, though only from Panamá Province on the latter. It is found across central Colombia east to the Magdalena Valley and Cundinamarca Department, and south on the Pacific slope into western Ecuador as far as Azuay Province. It inhabits the understorey and mid-storey of lowland and foothill evergreen forest and shrubby secondary forest. It typically occurs in shrubby areas, often along watercourses. It seldom occurs in the forest interior except in regrowing clearings. It also sometimes occurs outside the forest in gardens and plantations. In elevation it mostly ranges from sea level to about 800 m (2,600 ft) but reaches only 500 m (1,600 ft) in Panama and is locally found up to 1,200 m (3,900 ft) in Colombia.

== Behavior ==
=== Movement ===
The Pacific antwren is believed to be a year-round resident throughout its range.

=== Feeding ===
The Pacific antwren feeds on arthropods, especially insects and spiders. It typically forages singly or in pairs and briefly, but seldom, joins mixed-species feeding flocks. It mostly feeds in dense foliage between about 2 and 10 m (7 and 30 ft) above the ground, though sometimes as high as 17 m (55 ft). It actively seeks prey among leaves and vine tangles and along branches, gleaning by reaching, lunging, and with brief sallies from a perch.

=== Breeding ===
The Pacific antwren breeds between January and July in Panama. An active nest was observed in Colombia in March. The species' nest is a cup woven of small vines and other plant filaments or fine grasses, sometimes with dry leaves or moss on the outside. It is suspended in a branch fork, usually near the end, and hidden in foliage between 2 and 6 m (7 and 20 ft) above the ground. The clutch size is two eggs. The incubation period, time to fledging, and details of parental care are not known.

=== Vocalization ===
The Pacific antwren's song is "a fast, spritely chipper that rises slightly in pitch, e.g., 'chee-chee-chi-chich-ch-ch-ch-ch-ch-ch' ". Its calls include "chee-pu", "chee-cher", and "a strident, evenly pitched 'chrreee-chrreee-chrreee-chrreee!' ".

== Status ==
The IUCN has assessed the Pacific antwren as being of Least Concern. It has a large range and an estimated population of at least 50,000 mature individuals; the latter is believed to be decreasing. No immediate threats have been identified. It is considered fairly common across its range and occurs in several protected areas. It "[o]ccupies a variety of shrubby forest-edge and second-growth habitats, making it less sensitive than most antbirds to human disturbance".
