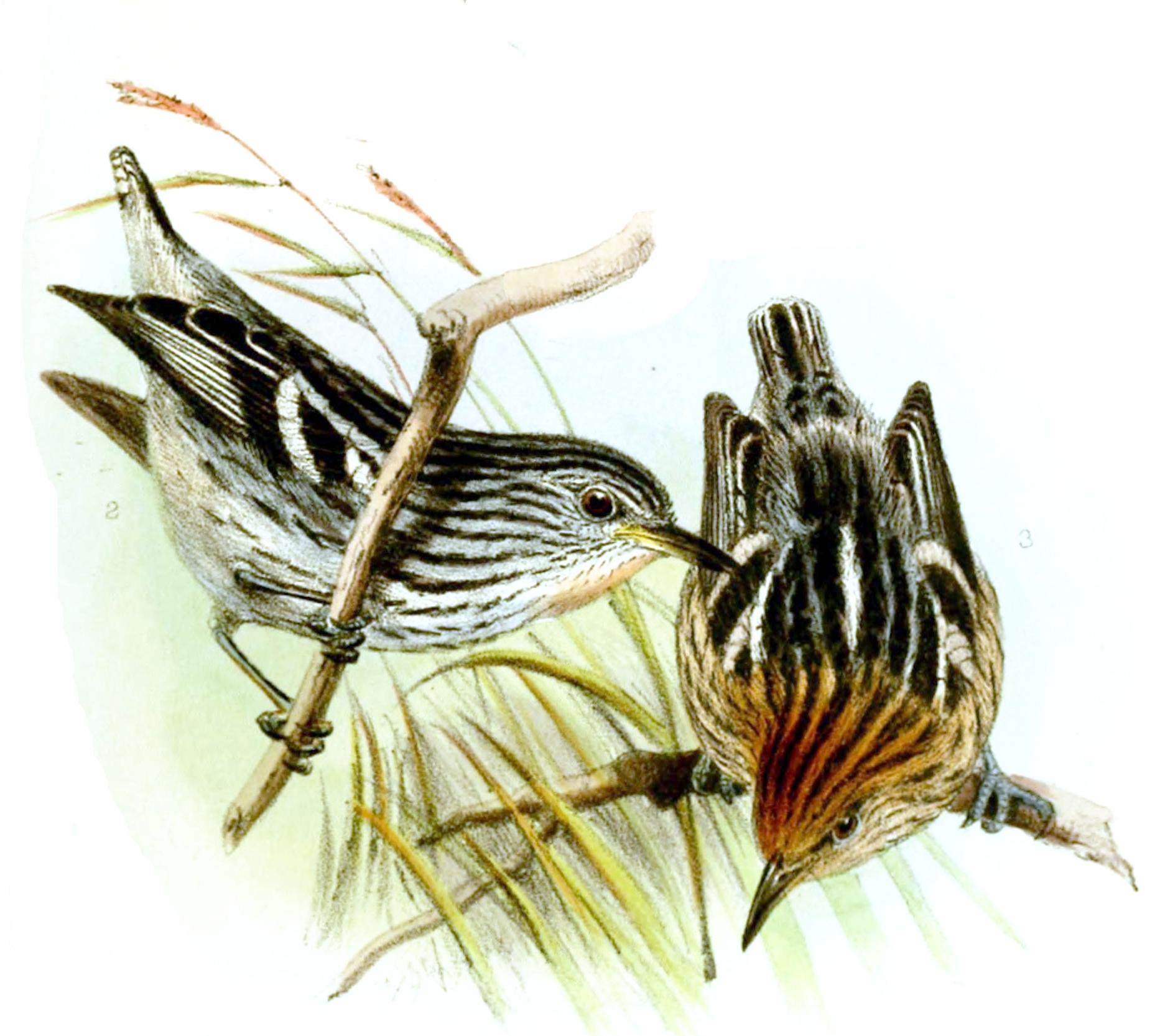

Conservation status
- Least Concern (IUCN 3.1)

Scientific classification
- Kingdom: Animalia
- Phylum: Chordata
- Class: Aves
- Order: Passeriformes
- Family: Thamnophilidae
- Genus: Myrmotherula
- Species: M. multostriata

Binomial name
- Myrmotherula multostriata Sclater, PL, 1858

= Amazonian streaked antwren =

Species of bird

The Amazonian streaked antwren (Myrmotherula multostriata) is a species of bird in subfamily Thamnophilinae of family Thamnophilidae, the "typical antbirds". It is found in Bolivia, Brazil, Colombia, Ecuador, Peru, and Venezuela.

== Taxonomy and systematics ==
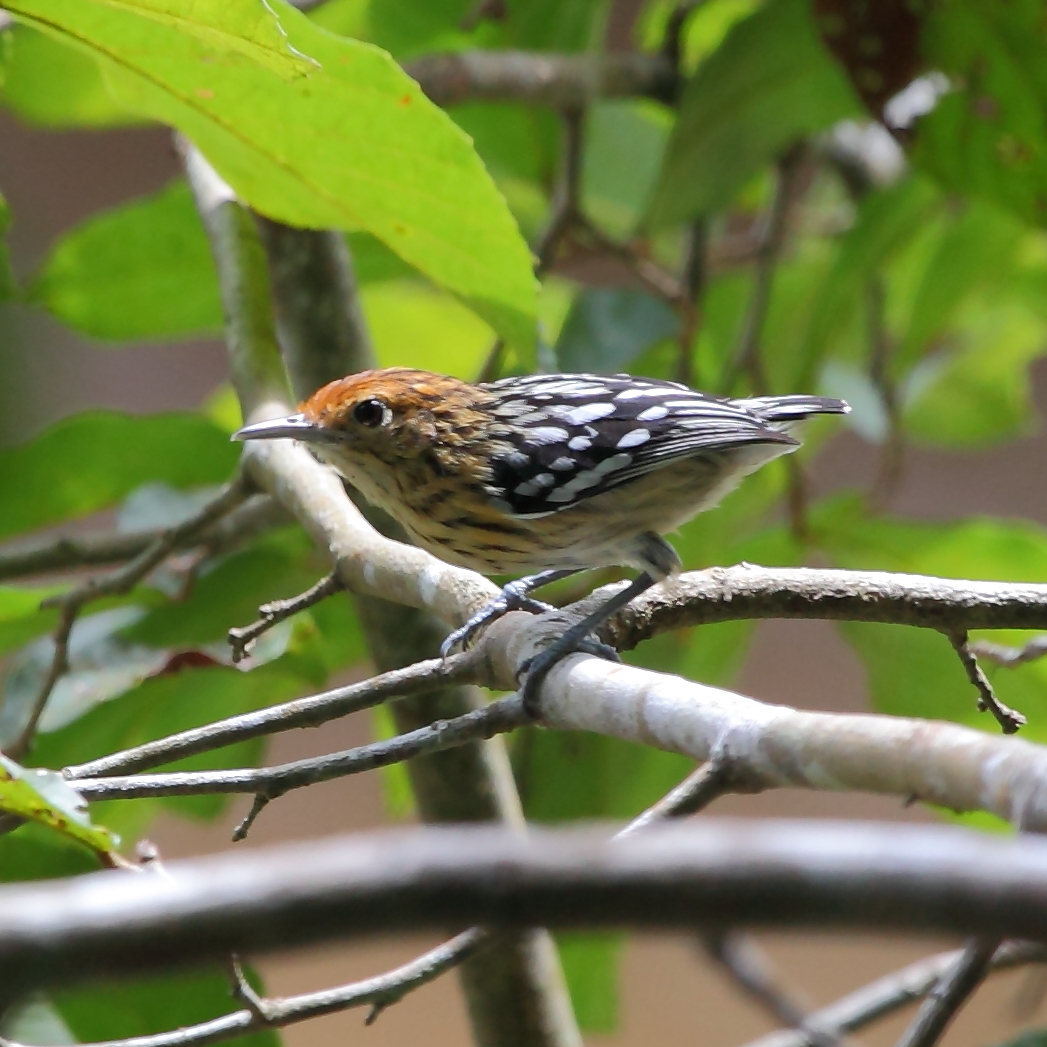
Female at Apiacás, Mato Grosso

The Amazonian streaked antwren was described and illustrated by the English zoologist Philip Sclater in 1858 and given its current binomial name Myrmotherula multostriata. By the early twentieth century it and what are now the Guianan streaked antwren (M. surinamensis) and the Pacific antwren (M. pacifica) were considered conspecific as the "streaked antwren". Differences in their plumage and voice indicate that they are separate species. The Amazonian streaked antwren is monotypic: No subspecies are recognized.

== Description ==
The Amazonian streaked antwren is 9 to 10 cm (3.5 to 3.9 in) long and weighs 7.5 to 9 g (0.26 to 0.32 oz). It is a smallish bird with a tiny tail. Adult males have a black and white streaked face. Their crown, back, and rump are black with white streaks. They have a large white patch between the shoulders. Their tail is black with white edges and tips to the feathers. Their wings are black with white tips on the coverts and white edges on the flight feathers. Their throat, breast, and belly are white and their flanks and crissum grayer. Black streaks extend from the throat to the flanks and belly. Adult females have a buff face and cinnamon-rufous crown and nape with black streaks. Their breast and sides are buff and the rest of their underparts white with a buff tinge; their underparts have widespread thin black streaks.

== Distribution and habitat ==
The Amazonian streaked antwren is found locally in eastern Colombia and southern Venezuela. From there its range extends south and east through eastern Ecuador and eastern Peru into northern Bolivia and central Brazil to Maranhão and Tocantins in the east and Mato Grosso in the south. There is also an apparently isolated population in Brazil's Mato Grosso do Sul. It occurs almost entirely south of the Amazon River except in the lower reaches of the Rio Negro basin, a northern tributary. It inhabits the understorey and mid-storey of lowland evergreen forest (primarily várzea and igapó) and shrubby secondary forest. It occurs almost entirely near water, in thickets and vine tangles along rivers, streams, and oxbow lakes. In elevation it ranges from sea level to about 550 m (1,800 ft) but only to about 300 m (1,000 ft) in Colombia and Ecuador.

== Behavior ==
=== Movement ===
The Amazonian streaked antwren is believed to be a year-round resident throughout its range.

=== Feeding ===
The Amazonian streaked antwren feeds on arthropods, especially insects and probably also spiders. It typically forages singly or in pairs and briefly, but seldom, joins mixed-species feeding flocks. It mostly feeds between about 1 and 15 m (3 and 50 ft) above the ground or water. It actively seeks prey among leaves and vine tangles and along branches, gleaning by reaching, lunging, and with brief sallies from a perch.

=== Breeding ===
The Amazonian streaked antwren nests in Brazil between July and December; there are nesting records from Columbia in July and from Bolivia in June. Its nest is a cup or pouch of plant filaments and green moss with dried leaves on the outside, typically suspended from a fork about 0.3 to 3 m (1 to 10 ft) above water or the bank of a water feature. The clutch size is two eggs. Both parents incubate during the day and apparently only the female at night. The incubation period, time to fledging, and other details of parental care are not known.

=== Vocalization ===
The Amazonian streaked antwren's song is a "short, musical, at start slightly rising rattle" that has been written as "pur-pur-peé-peé-peé-pur". Its calls include "an evenly pitched dry trill 'dr-r-r-r-r-r' ", a " 'chee-pu' contact call", and "a flat complaining note.

== Status ==
The IUCN has assessed the Amazonian streaked antwren as being of Least Concern. It has a very large range, and though its population size is not known it is believed to be stable. No immediate threats have been identified. It is considered fairly common in most of its range though uncommon and local in Ecuador. It occurs in several large protected areas and "its range has been little affected by development or human colonization".
