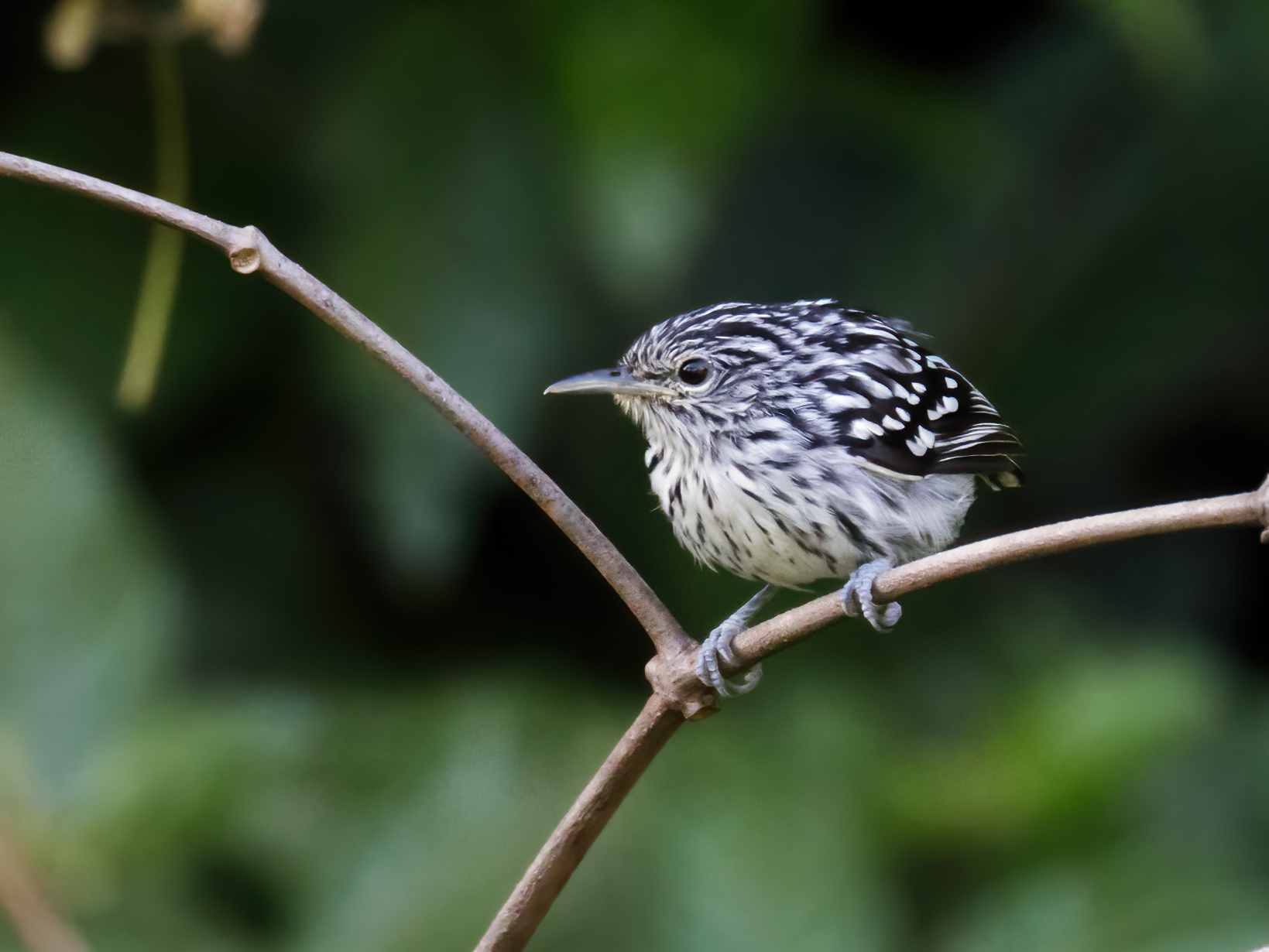
- male
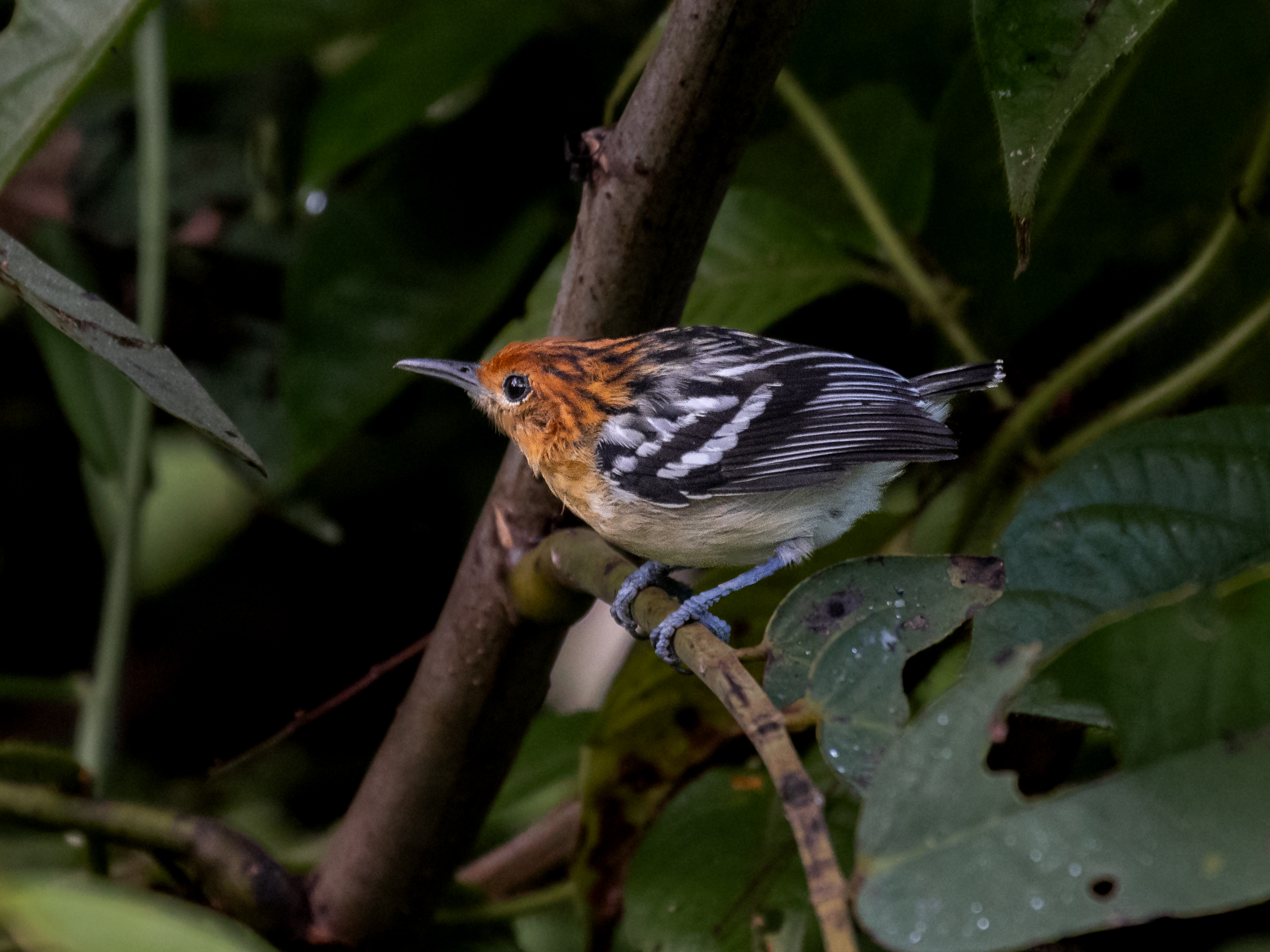
- female

Conservation status
- Least Concern (IUCN 3.1)

Scientific classification
- Kingdom: Animalia
- Phylum: Chordata
- Class: Aves
- Order: Passeriformes
- Family: Thamnophilidae
- Genus: Myrmotherula
- Species: M. surinamensis

Binomial name
- Myrmotherula surinamensis (Gmelin, JF, 1788)

Synonyms
- Sitta surinamensis

= Guianan streaked antwren =

Species of bird

The Guianan streaked antwren (Myrmotherula surinamensis) is a species of bird in subfamily Thamnophilinae of family Thamnophilidae, the "typical antbirds". It is found in Brazil, Colombia, French Guiana, Guyana, Suriname, and Venezuela.

== Taxonomy and systematics ==
The Guianan streaked antwren was formally described in 1788 by the German naturalist Johann Friedrich Gmelin in his revised and expanded edition of Carl Linnaeus's Systema Naturae. He placed it with the nuthatches in the genus Sitta and coined the binomial name Sitta surinamensis. Gmelin based his description on the "Surinam nuthatch" that had been described and illustrated in 1782 by the English ornithologist John Latham in his A General Synopsis of Birds. The Guianan streaked antwren is now placed in the genus Myrmotherula that was introduced in 1858 by Philip Sclater. The species is monotypic: No subspecies are recognized.

During much of the twentieth century the Guianan streaked antwren and what are now the Pacific antwren (Myrmotherula pacifica) and the Amazonian streaked antwren (M. multostriata) were considered conspecific as the "streaked antwren". Differences in their plumage and voice indicate that they are separate species.

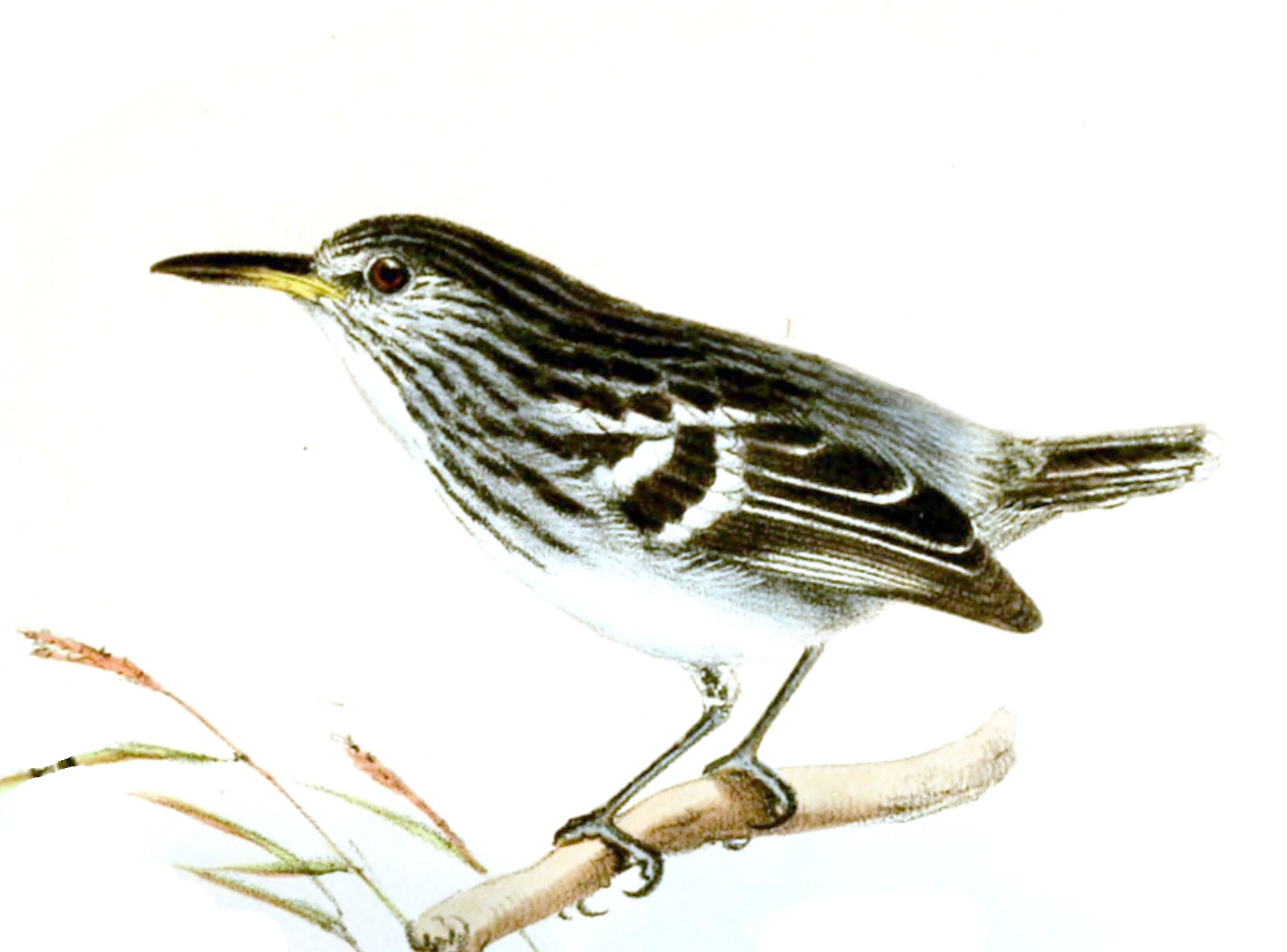
Illustration by Joseph Wolf, 1858

== Description ==
The Guianan streaked antwren is 9 to 10.5 cm (3.5 to 4.1 in) long and weighs 7.5 to 9 g (0.26 to 0.32 oz). It is a smallish bird with a tiny tail. Adult males have a black and white streaked face. Their crown, back, and rump are black with thin white streaks. They have a large white patch between the shoulders. Their tail is black with white edges and tips to the feathers. Their wings are black with white tips on the coverts and white edges on the flight feathers. Their throat, breast, and belly are white and their flanks and crissum gray. Black streaks extend from the throat to the flanks and belly. Adult females have an orange-buff face and cinnamon-rufous crown and nape with black streaks. Their belly and crissum have a buff tinge; their underparts are mostly plain but may have fine streaks on the breast and sides.

== Distribution and habitat ==
The Guianan streaked antwren is found from extreme eastern Colombia east through southern Venezuela and the Guianas and northern Brazil. It occurs only north and east of the Rio Negro and the Amazon River. It inhabits the understorey and mid-storey of lowland evergreen forest (primarily várzea and igapó) and shrubby secondary forest. It occurs almost entirely near water, in thickets and vine tangles by rivers, streams, and ponds, and in French Guiana also in mangroves. It occasionally is found in large clearings and shrubby forest borders away from water. In elevation it ranges from sea level to 450 m (1,500 ft).

== Behavior ==
=== Movement ===
The Guianan streaked antwren is believed to be a year-round resident throughout its range.

=== Feeding ===
The Guianan streaked antwren feeds on arthropods, especially insects and probably also spiders. It typically forages singly or in pairs and briefly, but seldom, joins mixed-species feeding flocks. It mostly feeds between about 1 and 15 m (3 and 50 ft) above the ground or water. It actively seeks prey among leaves and vine tangles and along branches, gleaning by reaching, lunging, and with brief sallies from a perch.

=== Breeding ===
The Guianan streaked antwren's breeding season has not been defined, though active nests have been seen between August and October and dependent young in February. One nest in French Guiana was covered with moss; it was on a branch about 1 m (3 ft) above water and contained two eggs.

=== Vocalization ===
The Guianan streaked antwren's song is a "short, sharp, level trill 'd-rrrrr', 'd-' slightly lower". Its calls include a "slightly downslurred, complaining note, often given in doublet", a "short rattle", and a "single, abrupt 'chit' ".

== Status ==
The IUCN originally in 2004 assessed the Guiana streaked antwren as being of Least Concern, then in 2012 as Vulnerable, and then in 2023 again as of Least Concern. It has a large range, and though its population size is not known it is believed to be stable. "The primary threat to this species is accelerating deforestation, as land is cleared for logging, cattle ranching and soy production, facilitated by expansion of the road network. Deforestation is overall low and large tracts of pristine forests persist, but it may be locally high, especially in the Brazilian part of the range." It is considered uncommon to fairly common in most of its range. It occurs in several protected areas in Venezuela and a few elsewhere. "The ability of this species to persist in shrubby second-growth habitats makes it less sensitive to disturbance than many other forest species" but deforestation is increasing.
