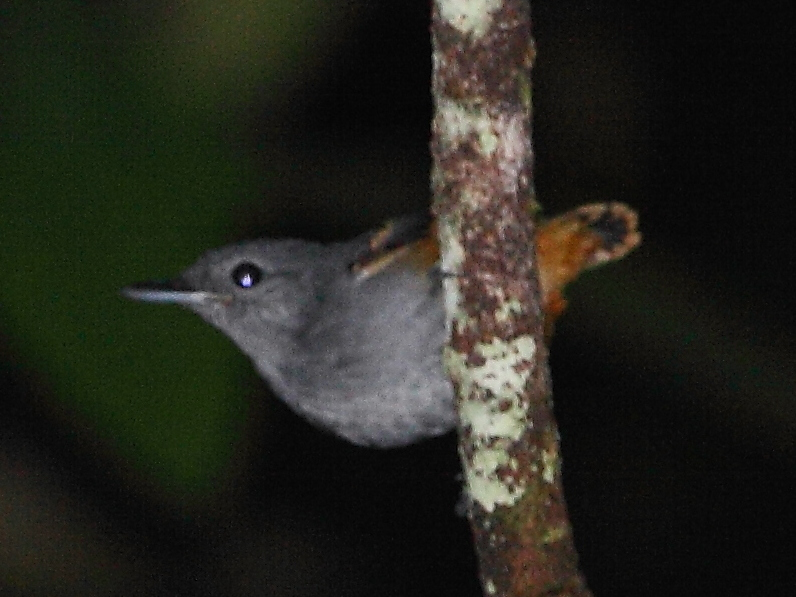
- Male at Presidente Figueiredo, Amazonas state, Brazil

Conservation status
- Least Concern (IUCN 3.1)

Scientific classification
- Kingdom: Animalia
- Phylum: Chordata
- Class: Aves
- Order: Passeriformes
- Family: Thamnophilidae
- Genus: Isleria
- Species: I. guttata

Binomial name
- Isleria guttata (Vieillot, 1824)

Synonyms
- Myrmotherula guttata

= Rufous-bellied antwren =

Species of bird

The rufous-bellied antwren (Isleria guttata) is a species of bird in subfamily Thamnophilinae of family Thamnophilidae, the "typical antbirds". It is found in Brazil, French Guiana, Guyana, Suriname, and Venezuela.

== Taxonomy and systematics ==
The rufous-bellied antwren was described and illustrated by the French ornithologist Louis Pierre Vieillot in 1824 and given the binomial name Myrmothera guttata. The current genus Isleria was introduced in 2012.

The rufous-bellied antwren and the plain-throated antwren (I. hauxwelli) share genus Isleria and the two form a superspecies. The rufous-bellied antwren is monotypic.

== Description ==
The rufous-bellied antwren is 8.5 to 9.5 cm (3.3 to 3.7 in) long and weighs 8.5 to 11 g (0.30 to 0.39 oz). It has a very short tail. Adult males are mostly gray. They have a white patch between their scapulars and pale cinnamon spots on their uppertail coverts. Their wings and tail are blackish brown with cinnamon edges on the flight feathers and pale cinnamon tips on the wing coverts and tail feathers. Their throat is pale gray and their lower belly, flanks, and crissum are tawny. Adult females have olive-gray upperparts and a grayish olive breast; they are otherwise like males.

== Distribution and habitat ==
The rufous-bellied antwren is found in southern Venezuela's Bolívar and Amazonas states east through the Guianas and Brazil north of the Amazon and east of the Negro rivers. It primarily inhabits terra firme evergreen forest. It favors areas with shady undergrowth and much leaf litter, especially near slow-moving streams and somewhat wet spots. In elevation it occurs from sea level to 600 m (2,000 ft).

== Behavior ==
=== Movement ===
The rufous-bellied antwren is believed to be a year-round resident throughout its range.

=== Feeding ===
The rufous-bellied antwren's diet has not been detailed but includes insects and spiders. It mostly forages singly or in pairs, and joins mixed-species feeding flocks while they pass through the antwren's territory. It typically forages from the ground up to within about 1 m (3 ft) above it but will feed as high as 2 m (7 ft). It actively gleans from leaves, stems, and branches by reaching from a perch and making short jumps while hitching up vertical stems and vines. It has been observed following army ant swarms in Brazil, Guyana, and Suriname.

=== Breeding ===
The rufous-bellied antwren's breeding season has not been defined but includes at least August to December. Its nest is a cup suspended about 1 to 1.5 m (3 to 5 ft) above the ground. The clutch size is two eggs. The incubation period, time to fledging, and details of parental care are not known.

=== Vocalization ===
The rufous-bellied antwren's song is a "very/extr. high, almost level series of 15-20 piercing, well-separated 'tzeet' notes, first few slightly drawn out". Its alarm call is a "low, rattling 'trru' ".

== Status ==
The IUCN has assessed the rufous-bellied antwren as being of Least Concern. It has a very large range. Its population size is not known and is believed to be stable. No immediate threats have been identified. It is considered uncommon to fairly common. Its range includes several large protected areas and "also encompasses vast contiguous areas of intact habitat which, although not formally protected, are under little or no current threat of development".
