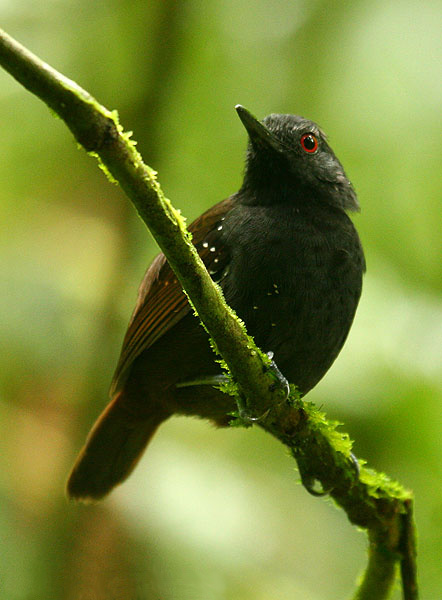
- Male at Tapir Lodge trails near Braulio Carrillo National Park (Costa Rica)

Conservation status
- Least Concern (IUCN 3.1)

Scientific classification
- Kingdom: Animalia
- Phylum: Chordata
- Class: Aves
- Order: Passeriformes
- Family: Thamnophilidae
- Genus: Sipia
- Species: S. laemosticta

Binomial name
- Sipia laemosticta (Salvin, 1865)

Synonyms
- Myrmeciza laemosticta

= Dull-mantled antbird =

Species of bird

The dull-mantled antbird (Sipia laemosticta) is a perching bird species in subfamily Thamnophilinae of family Thamnophilidae, the "typical antbirds". It is found in Colombia, Costa Rica, and Panama.

== Taxonomy and systematics ==
The dull-mantled antbird was described by the English naturalist Osbert Salvin in 1865 and given the binomial name Myrmeciza laemosticta. A molecular phylogenetic study published in 2013 found that the genus Myrmeciza, as then defined, was polyphyletic. In the resulting rearrangement to create monophyletic genera, four species including the dull-mantled antbird were moved to the resurrected genus Sipia that had been introduced by the Austrian ornithologist Carl Eduard Hellmayr in 1924.

What is now the Magdalena antbird (S. palliata) was previously considered conspecific with the dull-mantled antbird but was elevated to species status based on an analysis of vocalization and mitochondrial DNA sequences published in 2010.

The dull-mantled antbird's closest relative appears to be the Esmeraldas antbird (S. nigricauda). The other two members of genus Sipia, the Magdalena antbird and stub-tailed antbird (S. berlepschi) are the next most closely related. The chestnut-backed antbird (Poliocrania exsul) and grey-headed antbird (Ampelornis griseiceps) are somewhat more distantly related.

The dull-mantled antbird is monotypic.

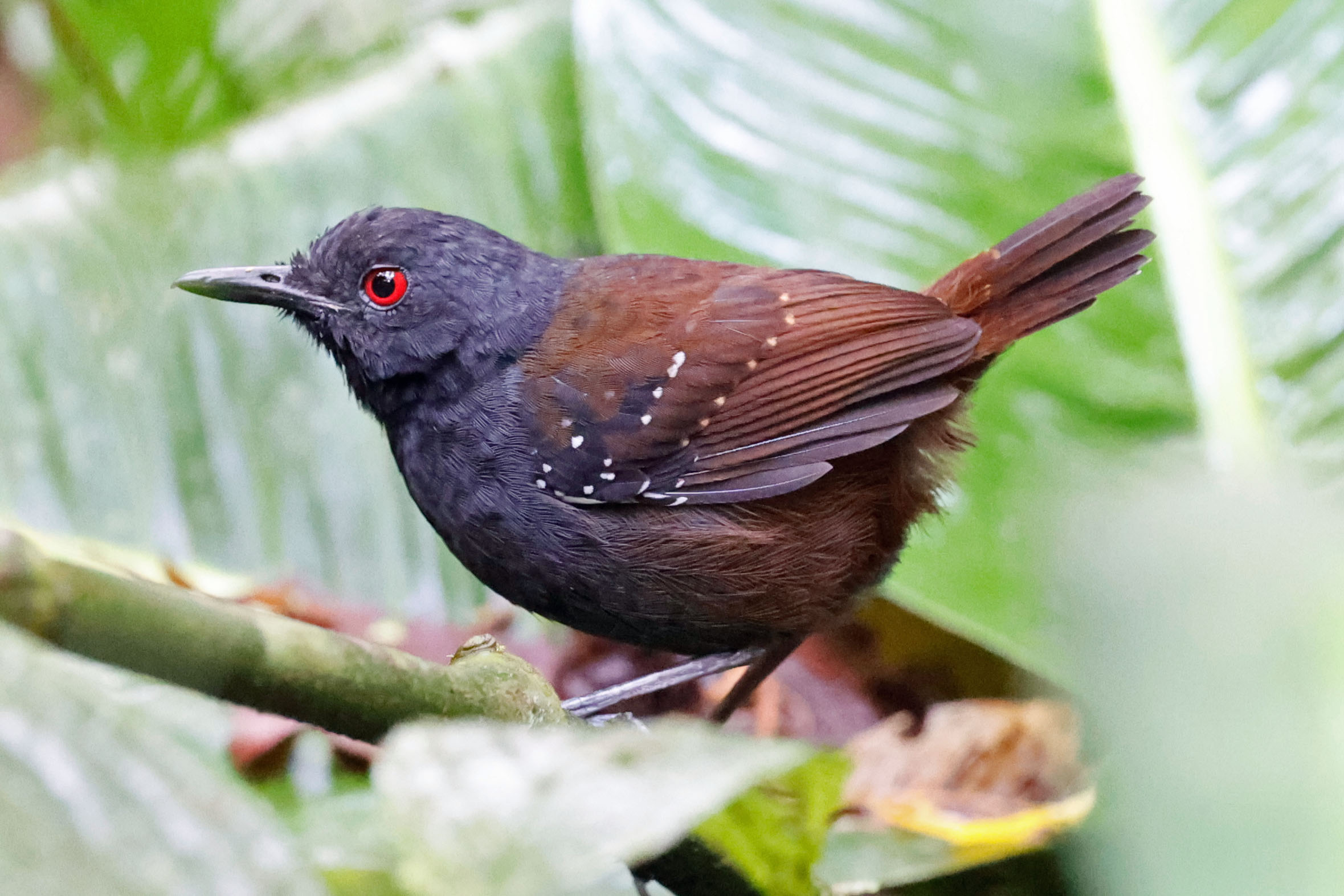
Male dull-mantled antbird, Arenal, Costa Rica, taken on 13 March 2024.

== Description ==
The dull-mantled antbird is 12.5 to 15.0 cm (4.9 to 5.9 in) long and weighs about 25 g (0.88 oz). Adult males have a blackish gray to slate-black head, neck, and upper mantle. The rest of their upperparts are dark reddish brown, chestnut, or olive with a usually hidden white patch between their scapulars. Their flight feathers and tail are blackish brown with dark reddish brown edges. Their greater wing coverts are dark reddish brown with cinnamon or rufous tips; their median and lesser coverts are black with white tips. Their throat and chin are black, their sides, flanks, and undertail coverts are reddish brown, and the rest of their underparts are dark gray or slate. Adult females are similar to males with gray areas that are somewhat less blackish than the male's. Their interscapular patch is much smaller than the male's. Their median wing coverts have a cinnamon tinge. Their throat is black with many white spots or bars. Both sexes have a red iris and gray legs and feet. Based on one description of each sex, males apparently have a black bill and females a black maxilla and gray mandible. Young males have a brown wash on their head, faint buff mottling on their throat, and no black on their underparts.

== Distribution and habitat ==
The dull-mantled antbird has a disjunct distribution. It is found in Costa Rica on the Caribbean slope from the Cordillera de Guanacaste south at elevations between 300 and 900 m (1,000 and 3,000 ft). In Panama it occurs on both the Caribbean and Pacific slopes, in Bocas del Toro and Veraguas provinces and from Guna Yala south to Colombia. In Panama it ranges from near sea level to 1,000 m (3,300 ft). At least one sighting has been documented in extreme northwestern Colombia. The species primarily inhabits the floor and understorey of wet foothills evergreen forest and also occurs in lowlands. It favors ravines and slopes along streams with dense vegetation and also regenerating vegetation in landslide scars and tree-fall openings.

== Behavior ==
=== Movement ===
The dull-mantled antbird is a year-round resident throughout its range.

=== Feeding ===
The dull-mantled antbird feeds on insects and other arthropods like spiders. Individuals, pairs, and family groups forage in dense vegetation mostly on the ground and also up to about 1 m (3 ft) above it. It captures prey by gleaning vegetation while perched, by picking from leaf litter, or with a jump or a short flutter flight to overhanging vegetation. It rarely rummages through leaf litter to search for prey; rather, it will observe its surroundings tensely, beating down its tail forcefully and slowly raising it up again, and then strike directly at something that has attracted its interest. Small prey is devoured immediately; larger animals are beaten vigorously on branches to make them easier to swallow. It seldom joins mixed-species feeding flocks but occasionally attends army ant swarms to capture prey that flees from the ants.

=== Breeding ===
The dull-mantled antbird's breeding season has not been defined but in Costa Rica includes at least April and May. The only known nests were found in Costa Rica. They were cups woven of several kinds of somewhat coarse plant fibers, sometimes with moss on the outside, and lined with finer fibers. They were within 1 m (3 ft) of the ground in small shrubs or saplings near watercourses. Two of the nests each held two eggs; in one they were white with cinnamon markings and in the other were pinkish with cinnamon and lavender markings.

=== Vocalization ===
The male dull-mantled antbird's loudsong is "a countable series (e.g., eight notes, over 1.8 seconds) of short notes that begins with three upslurred to flat notes and abruptly switches to five evenly paced downslurred notes, e.g., tsee tsee tsee, tyew-tyew-tyew-tyew". The female's loudsong "has the initial three notes longer and raspier than those of male, followed by 2–4 abrupt, downslurred, and chevron-shaped terminal notes, dropping in pitch and intensity"; it often is sung right after the male sings. The species' calls "include short (e.g., 0.1–0.2 seconds), burry, downslurred notes, dzhrw or jeew, as well as abrupt, sometimes doubled, chip notes."

== Status ==
The IUCN has assessed the dull-mantled antbird as being of Least Concern. Its population size is not known and is believed to be decreasing. No immediate threats have been identified. It is considered fairly common in Costa Rica and in eastern Panama though patchily distributed across its range. It is "[c]onsidered to be of high sensitivity to disturbance, and, in view of its small geographical range and narrow elevational limits, this species should be monitored for signs of decline."
