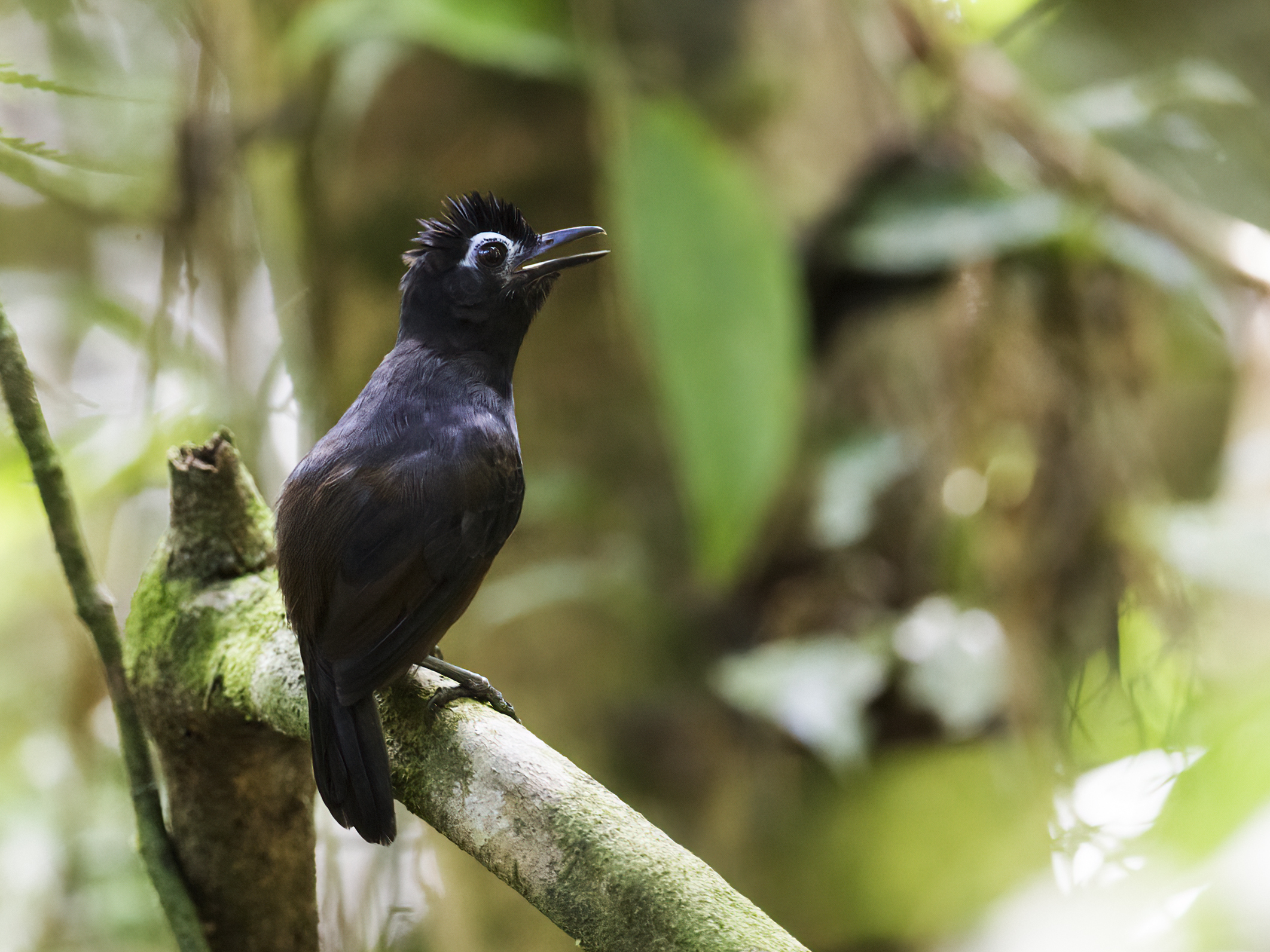
- Male
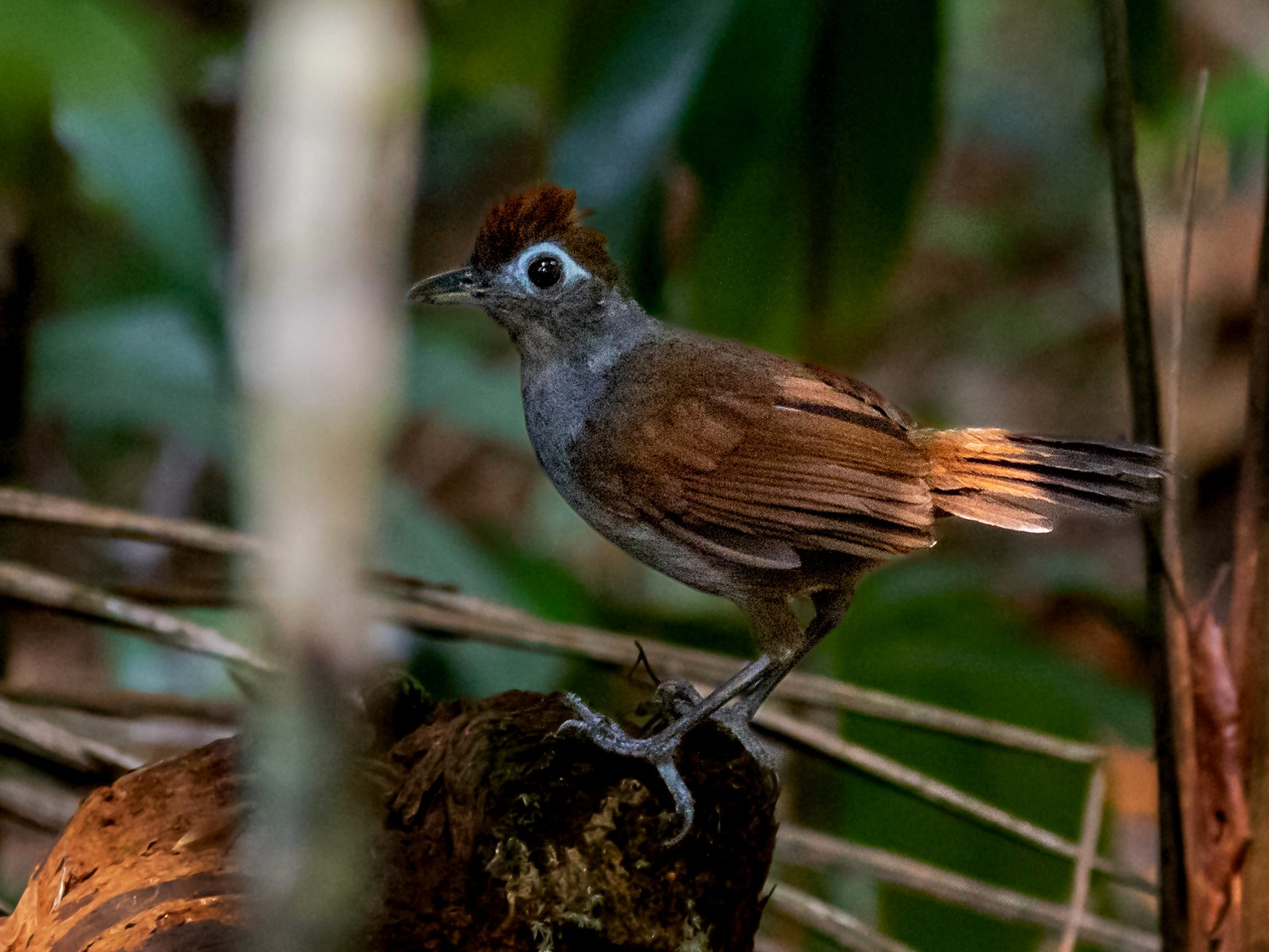
- Female

Conservation status
- Least Concern (IUCN 3.1)

Scientific classification
- Kingdom: Animalia
- Phylum: Chordata
- Class: Aves
- Order: Passeriformes
- Family: Thamnophilidae
- Genus: Hafferia
- Species: H. fortis

Binomial name
- Hafferia fortis (Sclater, PL & Salvin, 1868)

Synonyms
- Pernostola fortis; Myrmeciza fortis

= Sooty antbird =

Species of bird

The sooty antbird (Hafferia fortis) is a species of bird in subfamily Thamnophilinae of family Thamnophilidae, the "typical antbirds". It is found in Bolivia, Brazil, Colombia, Ecuador, and Peru.

== Taxonomy and systematics ==
The sooty antbird was described and illustrated by the English ornithologists Philip Sclater and Osbert Salvin in 1868 and given the binomial name Percnostola fortis. The species was later included in the genus Myrmeciza. A molecular phylogenetic study published in 2013 found that Myrmeciza was polyphyletic. In the resulting rearrangement to create monophyletic genera, the sooty antbird was moved to the newly erected genus Hafferia.

The sooty antbird shares genus Hafferia with the blue-lored antbird (H. immaculata) and Zeledon's antbird (H. zeledoni). It has two subspecies, the nominate H. f. fortis (Sclater, PL & Salvin, 1868) and H. f. incanescens (Todd, 1927).

== Description ==
The sooty antbird is 17 to 19 cm (6.7 to 7.5 in) long and weighs 42 to 48 g (1.5 to 1.7 oz). Both sexes have a ring of light blue bare skin around their eye and a red iris. Adult males of the nominate subspecies are mostly very dark gray with a brown tinge on their wings and a seldom visible white line at the bend of the wing. Adult females have a rufous-chestnut crown with a black border. Their upperparts are grayish olive-brown that becomes reddish yellow-brown at the rump. Their wings are rufous and their tail dark brown. Their lores, face, throat, and underparts are gray with a tawny tinge on their flanks and crissum. Subadult males resemble adult females but are darker and grayer overall with a blackish gray crown. Subspecies H. f. incanescens is almost identical to the nominate; some authors state that it has a grayer back.

== Distribution and habitat ==
The sooty antbird inhabits the western Amazon Basin, where the nominate subspecies is by far the more widely distributed of the two. It is found from the southern half of Colombia south through eastern Ecuador, eastern Peru as far as northern Puno Department, and northwestern Bolivia, and from them east into western Brazil south of the Amazon to the Madeira River. Subspecies H. f. incanescens is restricted to the vicinity of Tonantins, Brazil, on the right bank of the Upper Amazon (Solimões) in western Amazonas state. The species primarily inhabits the floor and understorey of terra firme evergreen forest and to a lesser extent transitional forest and occasionally várzea. It favors areas with dense undergrowth, often along watercourses and in viny openings caused by fallen trees. In elevation it reaches 300 m (1,000 ft) in Colombia, 600 m (2,000 ft) in Ecuador, and 1,300 m (4,300 ft) in Peru.

== Behavior ==
=== Movement ===
The sooty antbird is believed to be a year-round resident throughout its range.

=== Feeding ===
The sooty antbird feeds on a variety of insects and other arthropods. It typically forages singly, in pairs, or in family groups in dense vegetation, mostly on the ground and within about 1 m (3 ft) above it though occasionally to double that. It hops between short feeding stops, pumping its tail. It captures prey by gleaning, reaching, or pouncing to the ground from a perch and less frequently by short sallies to foliage and stems. It regularly follows army ant swarms to capture prey fleeing the ants; it often accompanies them for hours. It is often dominant over smaller ant-followers at swarms, though subordinate to larger ones. It occasionally joins mixed-species feeding flocks.

=== Breeding ===
The sooty antbird's breeding season might extend year-round but definitely includes October to April in Ecuador and September to November in Peru. Several nests have been discovered, most of them in southeastern Peru. They were domed structures with a horizontal entrance, made of dry leaves, sticks, and bark lined with thin roots and dry leaves. All were on the ground, often partially concealed among dry leaves. The clutch size was always two eggs that were white with dark brown or maroon markings. Both parents incubated the clutches during the day and the female alone at night. The incubation period could not be determined but fledging occurred nine to 13 days after hatch. Both parents brooded and provisioned the nestlings.

=== Vocalization ===
The sooty antbird's song is "a slowly and even-paced, rising series of ringing, descending whistled notes" pew pew PEW PEW PEW PEW PEW PEW". Its calls include "a loud, musical, puttering rattle, also a descending mewed aaww and a hollow, musical chatter: PEW'kur'kur'kur'kur'kur".

== Status ==
The IUCN has assessed the sooty antbird as being of Least Concern. It has a large range; its population size is not known and is believed to be stable. No immediate threats have been identified. It is considered fairly common in Colombia and uncommon to fairly common in Peru. Its range includes several large protected areas and also "extensive intact habitat which is not formally protected, but seems at little risk of development in near term".
