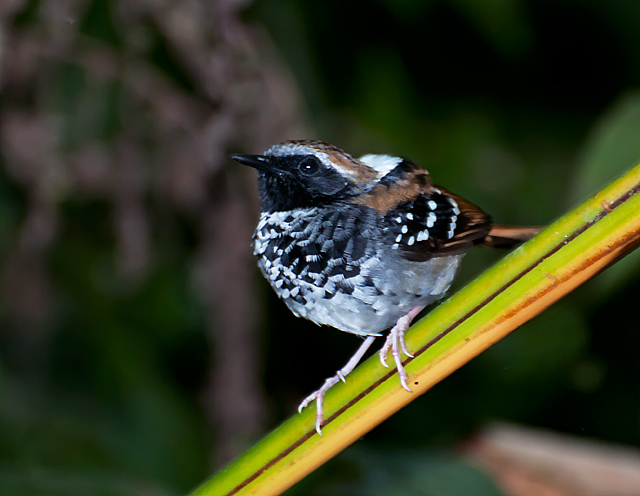

Conservation status
- Least Concern (IUCN 3.1)

Scientific classification
- Kingdom: Animalia
- Phylum: Chordata
- Class: Aves
- Order: Passeriformes
- Family: Thamnophilidae
- Genus: Myrmoderus
- Species: M. squamosus

Binomial name
- Myrmoderus squamosus (Pelzeln, 1868)

Synonyms
- Myrmeciza squamosa

= Squamate antbird =

Species of bird

The squamate antbird (Myrmoderus squamosus) is a species of bird in subfamily Thamnophilinae of family Thamnophilidae, the "typical antbirds". It is endemic to Brazil.

== Taxonomy and systematics ==
The squamate antbird was described by the Austrian ornithologist August von Pelzeln in 1868 and given the binomial name Myrmeciza squamosa. A molecular phylogenetic study published in 2013 found that Myrmeciza was polyphyletic. In the resulting rearrangement to create monotypic genera, four species including the squamate antbird were moved to the resurrected genus Myrmoderus. Some authors have suggested that the squamate antbird and the white-bibbed antbird (M. loricatus) are conspecific but the 2013 study confirmed them as sister species.

The squamate antbird is monotypic.

== Description ==
The squamate antbird is 14 to 15 cm (5.5 to 5.9 in) long and weighs 16.5 to 20 g (0.58 to 0.71 oz). Adult males have a dark yellowish brown crown and upperparts with a white patch between their scapulars; some black is scattered across their back. They have a long gray-tinged white supercilium on an otherwise mostly black face. Their tail is dark yellowish brown with tawny feather edges. Their flight feathers are brownish with rufous edges and their wing coverts black with wide white tips. Their chin and throat are black. Their breast and side feathers are black with wide white edges. Their belly is white and their flanks and crissum ochre-brown. Adult females are similar to males but with paler upperparts, a white throat with faint gray bars, plain white underparts, and olive-brown flanks and sides.

== Distribution and habitat ==
The squamate antbird is found in eastern Brazil from southern São Paulo state south to northern Rio Grande do Sul. There is also one record from Iguaçu National Park in western Paraná. The species mostly inhabits the floor of evergreen forest and nearby mature secondary forest, and is also found locally near the coast in restinga woodland on sandy soil. It favors areas with many saplings and a dense herbaceous understorey. In elevation it ranges from sea level to 1,000 m (3,300 ft).

== Behavior ==
=== Movement ===
The squamate antbird is thought to be a year-round resident throughout its range.

=== Feeding ===
The squamate antbird feeds on insects, spiders, other arthropods, and small snails. Individuals, pairs, and family groups forage mostly on the ground though also in vegetation up to about 1 m (3 ft) above it. They actively hop on the ground and through vine tangles and brush. They probe leaf litter (seldom flipping leaves) and glean from low-hanging leaves by reaching and jumping. They occasionally join mixed-species feeding flocks that pass through their territory and have only once been seen attending an army ant swarm.

=== Breeding ===
The squamate antbird's breeding season is not known. The single known nest was an open cup placed near the ground; its composition was not described. The species' eggs vary from white to pinkish with violet, reddish brown, or purple spots or threads. The clutch size, incubation period, time to fledging, and details of parental care are not known.

=== Vocalization ===
The squamate antbird's song is "a countable series of doublets...similar to that of M. loricatus [which see here ] but starts at higher frequency and descends substantially more in pitch". Its call is "a short rattle and short downslurred note" that also is similar to the white-bibbed antbird's.

== Status ==
The IUCN has assessed the squamate antbird as being of Least Concern. It has a large range; its population size is not known and is believed to be decreasing. No immediate threats have been identified. It is considered fairly common throughout its range, which includes several private and public protected areas. "In addition, it appears to flourish in selectively logged forest."
