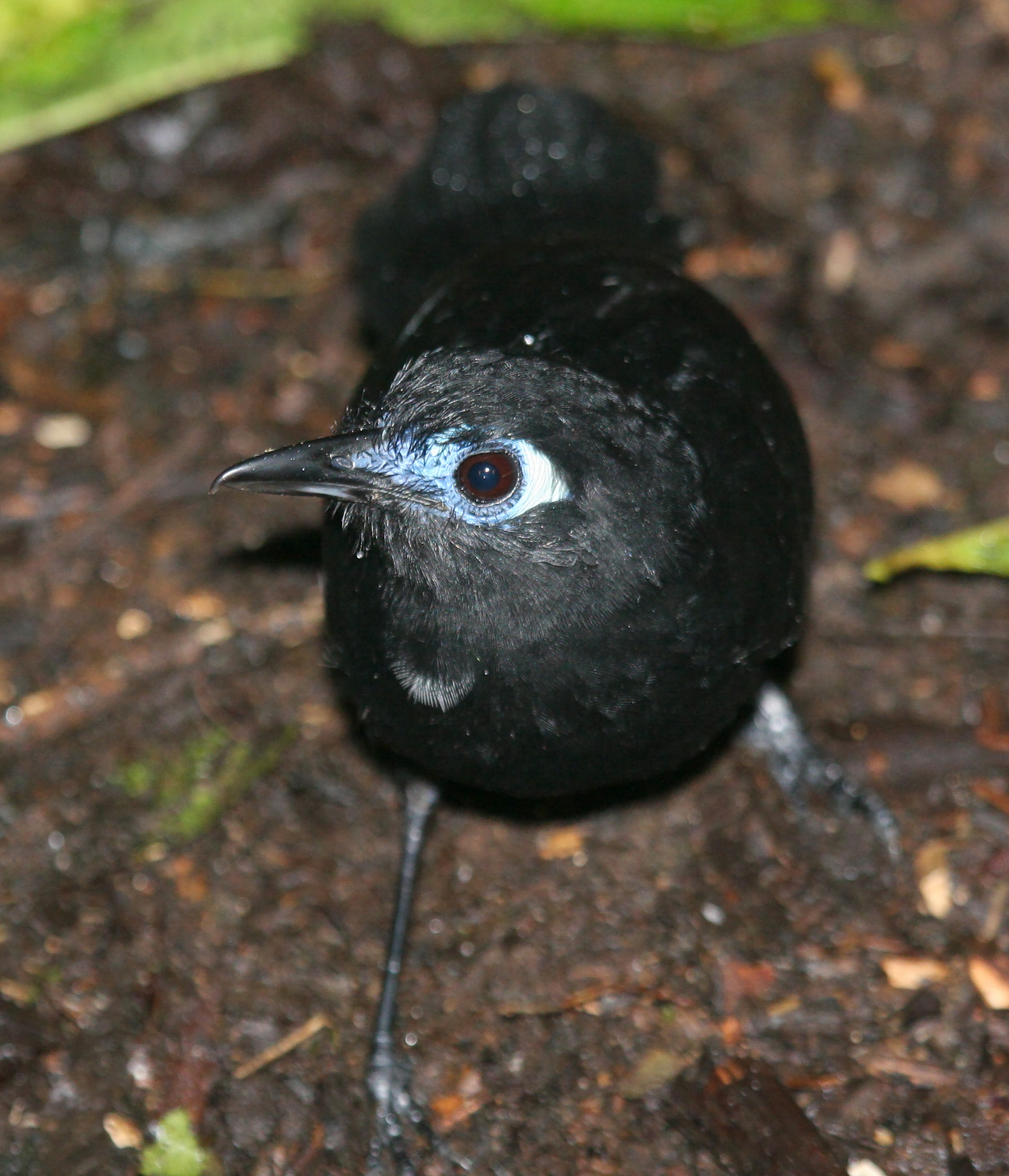
- Zeledon's antbird (Hafferia zeledoni)

Scientific classification
- Kingdom: Animalia
- Phylum: Chordata
- Class: Aves
- Order: Passeriformes
- Family: Thamnophilidae
- Genus: Hafferia; Isler, ML, Bravo & Brumfield, 2013

Type species
- Thamnophilus immaculatus Lafresnaye, 1845

Species
- Hafferia immaculata; Hafferia fortis; Hafferia zeledoni

= Hafferia =

Genus of birds

Hafferia is a genus of insectivorous passerine birds in the antbird family, Thamnophilidae, containing three species: the blue-lored antbird (H. immaculata), the sooty antbird (H. fortis), and Zeledon's antbird (H. zeledoni).

These medium-sized, dark-plumaged birds have light blue skin around their eyes. Females usually have lighter plumage than males. Their strong bills for insect hunting and long legs are adapted for ground foraging. They are obligate army-ant followers, using vocalizations for mate selection. They often appear in pairs and are territorial and defensive. Hafferia species usually build dome-shaped nests, laying white, spotted eggs with a 13 to 17-day incubation period shared by both parents.

Hafferia are restricted to the Neotropics, mainly lowland and foothill rainforests of Central and northern South America, especially Colombia, Ecuador, and Venezuela. As key ecological indicators, their presence reflects forest health, and their foraging behaviors help regulate insect populations, making them vital to their ecosystems.

== Taxonomy ==
The three species under Hafferia were previously classified in the genus Myrmeciza.

In 2004, Myrmeciza was determined to have a high morphological variability. In 2012, it was suggested that the taxonomic classification needs to be re-established to correspond to their evolutionary history. Genetic studies have confirmed the polyphyletic character of Myrmeciza, and showed that species in the Myrmeciza genus do not have a single common ancestor.

In 2013, phylogenic and systematics tests on Myrmeciza genus' DNA, morphology, behavior, and ecology were performed to determine whether Myrmeciza is monophyletic (a common evolutionary group). Molecular (DNA) data analysis (e.g., mitochondrial genes ND2, cyt-b) points out that these the species now assigned to Hafferia form a distinct evolutionary lineage with the family Thamnophilidae.

Species in Hafferia share morphological and ecological traits but are genetically distinct from Myrmeciza longipes. M. longipes belong to the Myrmeciza complex. Based on these genetic and phenotypic characteristics (including vocalizations), Hafferia was erected for Myrmeciza immaculata. In addition, Hafferia is more closely related to other antbirds in the family Thamnophilidae than to other Myrmeciza species.

=== Etymology ===
The genus name Hafferia is feminine. It was chosen to commemorate the late Jürgen Haffer, who made groundbreaking contributions to Neotropical ornithology.

== Species ==
Hafferia species are medium-sized antbirds with dark plumage, mostly grayish black to black, with subtle sexual differences. Males are usually darker than females. Females are mainly brown or brown and gray. Neither of them has wing covert spots. A notable feature is the light blue skin around their eyes. Their bills are strong and laterally flattened, adapted for catching arthropod prey. Their short and rounded wings and long legs adapted to terrestrial life easily in dense forest undergrowth. These characteristics reflect their behavior as ground-foraging insectivores.

Genus Hafferia – Isler, ML, Bravo & Brumfield, 2013 – three species
Common name	Scientific name and subspecies	Range	Size and ecology	IUCN status and estimated population (Note: Population figures rounded to the nearest hundred. Population trends as described by the International Union for Conservation of Nature.)
Blue-lored antbird Female Male	H. immaculata (Lafresnaye, 1845)	Colombia, Venezuela	Size: 18 to 19 cm (7.1 to 7.5 in) long, weighing 39 to 44 g (1.4 to 1.6 oz) Habitat: regenerating landslides and tree-falls on steep hillsides and ravines Diet: insects, other arthropods, and probably also small vertebrates	LC Unknown
Sooty antbird Female Male	H. fortis (Sclater, PL & Salvin, 1868)	Bolivia, Brazil, Colombia, Ecuador, Peru	Size: 17 to 19 cm (6.7 to 7.5 in) long, weighing 42 to 48 g (1.5 to 1.7 oz) Habitat: floor and understorey of terra firme evergreen forest and to a lesser extent transitional forest and occasionally várzea Diet: insects and other arthropods	LC Unknown
Zeledon's antbird Female Male	H. zeledoni (Ridgway, 1909)	Colombia, Costa Rica, Ecuador, Nicaragua, Panama	Size: 17 to 20 cm (6.7 to 7.9 in) long, weighing 40 to 56 g (1.4 to 2.0 oz) Habitat: understorey and edges of humid evergreen forest and mature secondary forest in the foothills Diet: a variety of arthropods and also on small vertebrates like lizards and frogs	LC 50,000-500,000

== Behavior ==
Hafferia species usually appear in pairs and have a habit of following ants. They tend to catch insects, especially those harassed by army ants. They are diurnal, choosing dense vegetation as shelter when they roost at night. However, during the incubation period, females are active at night.

Hafferia species may react strongly to the alarm calls of certain, often trusted, species. They will become more vigilant and sometimes even flee upon hearing these calls. Dominance hierarchies characterize mixed-species antbirds. Larger species keep smaller species away from areas where prey is abundant. Thus, the calls of smaller species elicit more attractive responses than the calls of larger, dominant species. Hafferia species may also adjust their foraging behavior based on the activities of other species to reduce the time spent searching for food, finding hidden food sources by tracking specific species. They will adjust their feeding patterns to minimize conflict in high interspecific competition areas.

Hafferia species have tweet discrimination behavior.

During the breeding season, males also establish and defend territories through vocal displays and physical aggression toward other males. They respond strongly to the songs of their species but may also respond to the songs of ecologically similar birds. Because they live in mixed-species ecosystems, Hafferia species may enhance their access to information by participating in mixed-species breeding. However, sooty antbird pairs never share groups with conspecific pairs.

Like most other species in the long-legged antbird evolutionary branch, Zeledon's and sooty antbirds build dome nests. However, there is no academic record describing the blue-lored antbird's nesting preference.

Clutches of two eggs are common among species of Thamnophilidae. The clutch size and egg color of Hafferia species are consistent with other species in the longipes clade. The eggs are white with irregular spots. Their egg temperature and growth rate are consistent with similar tropical birds.

Hafferia incubation attention levels are similar to other antbirds. Both parents will participate in the incubation to ensure a better survival rate with an incubation period of 13 to 17 days.

== Distribution and habitat ==
Hafferia species are usually found in the understory of moist forests (typically less than 5 m (16 ft) in height) and are only restricted to the Neotropics, mainly lowland and foothill rainforests of Central and northern South America, especially countries like Colombia, Ecuador, and Venezuela.

== Ecological importance ==
The presence of Hafferia species makes a huge contribution to the balance of local forest ecosystems. Because Hafferia species rely on intact forest ecosystems, they are also an important indicator of the ecological environment of their habitats.
