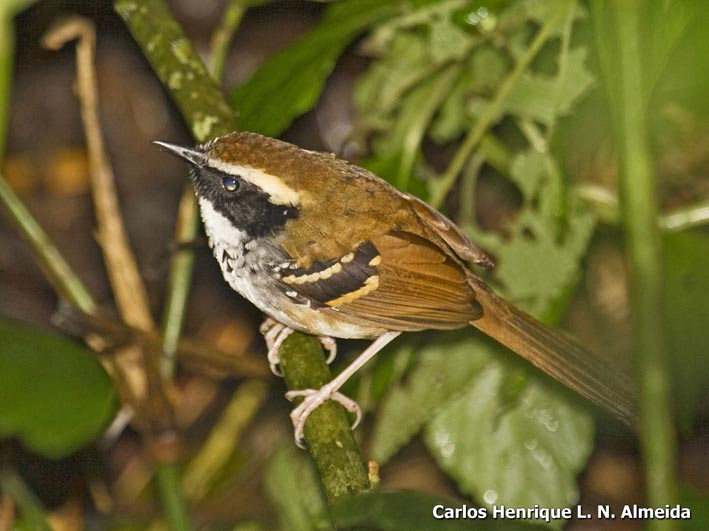

Conservation status
- Least Concern (IUCN 3.1)

Scientific classification
- Kingdom: Animalia
- Phylum: Chordata
- Class: Aves
- Order: Passeriformes
- Family: Thamnophilidae
- Genus: Myrmoderus
- Species: M. loricatus

Binomial name
- Myrmoderus loricatus (Lichtenstein, MHC, 1823)

Synonyms
- Myrmeciza loricata

= White-bibbed antbird =

Species of bird

The white-bibbed antbird (Myrmoderus loricatus) is a species of passerine bird in subfamily Thamnophilinae of family Thamnophilidae, the "typical antbirds". It is endemic to Brazil.

== Taxonomy and systematics ==
The white-bibbed antbird was formerly included in the genus Myrmeciza. A molecular phylogenetic study published in 2013 found that Myrmeciza, as then defined, was polyphyletic. In the resulting rearrangement to create monotypic genera, four species including the white-bibbed antbird were moved to the resurrected genus Myrmoderus. Some authors have suggested that the white-bibbed antbird and the squamate antbird (M. squamosus) are conspecific but the 2013 study confirmed them as sister species.

The white-bibbed antbird is monotypic.

== Description ==
The white-bibbed antbird is 14 to 15 cm (5.5 to 5.9 in) long. Adult males have a black crown with wide rufous-chestnut edges to the feathers. They have a long white supercilium on an otherwise mostly black face. Their upperparts and tail are mostly rufous-chestnut with a white patch between their scapulars. Their flight feathers are rufous-chestnut and their wing coverts black with wide white tips. Their chin is black. Their throat and underparts to the crissum are white with black scallops on the breast; their crissum is light ochre-brown. Adult females are similar to males but with a dark reddish yellow-brown crown, a pale buff supercilium, mostly plain white underparts, and pale buff flanks and crissum.

== Distribution and habitat ==
The white-bibbed antbird is found in eastern Brazil from central and southeastern Bahia south into northeastern São Paulo state. It inhabits the floor of evergreen forest and nearby mature secondary forest, where it favors areas with many saplings and a dense herbaceous understorey. In elevation it ranges between 700 and 1,300 m (2,300 and 4,300 ft).

== Behavior ==
=== Movement ===
The white-bibbed antbird is thought to be a year-round resident throughout its range.

=== Feeding ===
The white-bibbed antbird's diet has not been detailed but is known to include insects and probably also spiders. Individuals, pairs, and family groups forage mostly on the ground though also in vegetation up to about 1 m (3 ft) above it. They actively hop on the ground and through vine tangles and brush. They probe leaf litter (seldom flipping leaves) and glean from low-hanging leaves by reaching and jumping. They do not join mixed-species feeding flocks and only occasionally, and briefly, attend army ant swarms.

=== Breeding ===
The white-bibbed antbird's breeding season has not been defined but includes November and December. Its nest is a bowl made of dead leaves and plant fibers placed on or near the ground. The clutch is two eggs. In one clutch they were white and almost completely covered with small reddish dots; in another they were creamy white with vinaceous spots and streaks. The incubation period, time to fledging, and details of parental care are not known.

=== Vocalization ===
The white-bibbed antbird's song is an "extr. high, descending, rapid series of 3-5 whispered, sawing double 'siweesiwee-see' notes". Its call is a "very/extr. high, very fast 'tritititi' ".

== Status ==
The IUCN has assessed the white-bibbed antbird as being of Least Concern. It has a large range; its population size is not known and is believed to be decreasing. No immediate threats have been identified. It is considered uncommon to fairly common throughout its range, which includes several large private and public protected areas. However, "[o]n the local scale, some populations, such as those in the Serra do Ouricana, in Bahia, are at risk from accelerating habitat destruction".
