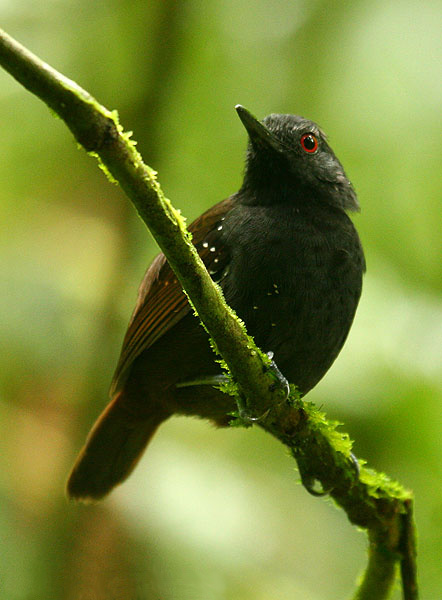
- Dull-mantled antbird (Sipia laemosticta)

Scientific classification
- Kingdom: Animalia
- Phylum: Chordata
- Class: Aves
- Order: Passeriformes
- Family: Thamnophilidae
- Genus: Sipia; Hellmayr, 1924

Type species
- Pyriglena berlepschi Hartert, 1898

= Sipia =

Genus of birds

Sipia is a genus of passerine birds in the family Thamnophilidae.

The genus contains four species:

- Dull-mantled antbird (Sipia laemosticta)
- Magdalena antbird (Sipia palliata)
- Esmeraldas antbird (Sipia nigricauda)
- Stub-tailed antbird (Sipia berlepschi)

These species were formerly placed in the genus Myrmeciza. A molecular phylogenetic study published in 2013 found that Myrmeciza, as then defined, was polyphyletic. In the resulting rearrangement to create monophyletic genera these four species were moved to the resurrected genus Sipia which had been introduced by the Austrian ornithologist Carl Eduard Hellmayr in 1924.
