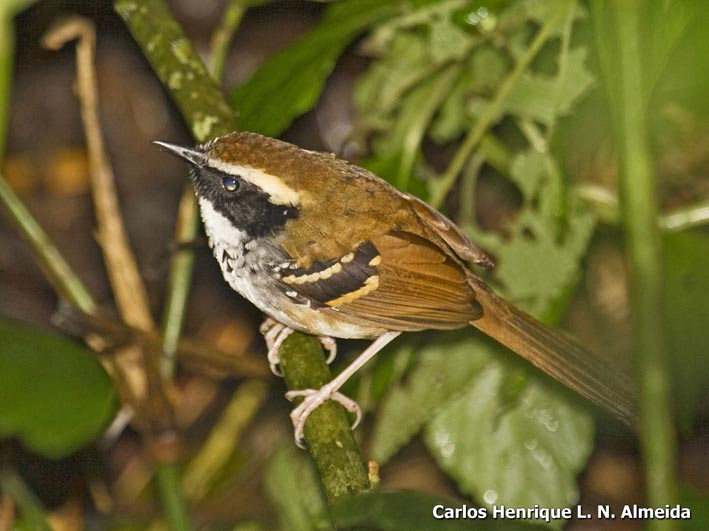
- White-bibbed antbird (Myrmoderus loricatus)

Scientific classification
- Kingdom: Animalia
- Phylum: Chordata
- Class: Aves
- Order: Passeriformes
- Family: Thamnophilidae
- Genus: Myrmoderus; Ridgway, 1909

Type species
- Myiothera loricata Lichtenstein, 1823

= Myrmoderus =

Genus of birds

Myrmoderus is a genus of passerine birds in the family Thamnophilidae.

The genus contains five species:

Image	Common name	Scientific name	Distribution
	Ferruginous-backed antbird	Myrmoderus ferrugineus	Guiana Shield south to Rondônia
	Cordillera Azul antbird	Myrmoderus eowilsoni	Cordillera Azul (Peru)
	Scalloped antbird	Myrmoderus ruficauda	Bahia forests
	White-bibbed antbird	Myrmoderus loricatus	Bahia forests
	Squamate antbird	Myrmoderus squamosus	southern Atlantic Forest

The Cordillera Azul antbird was first described in 2018. The other four species were formerly included in the genus Myrmeciza. A molecular phylogenetic study published in 2013 found that Myrmeciza, as then defined, was polyphyletic. In the resulting rearrangement to create monophyletic genera four species were moved to the resurrected genus Myrmoderus. The genus had originally been erected in 1909 by the American ornithologist Robert Ridgway with the white-bibbed antbird as the type species.
