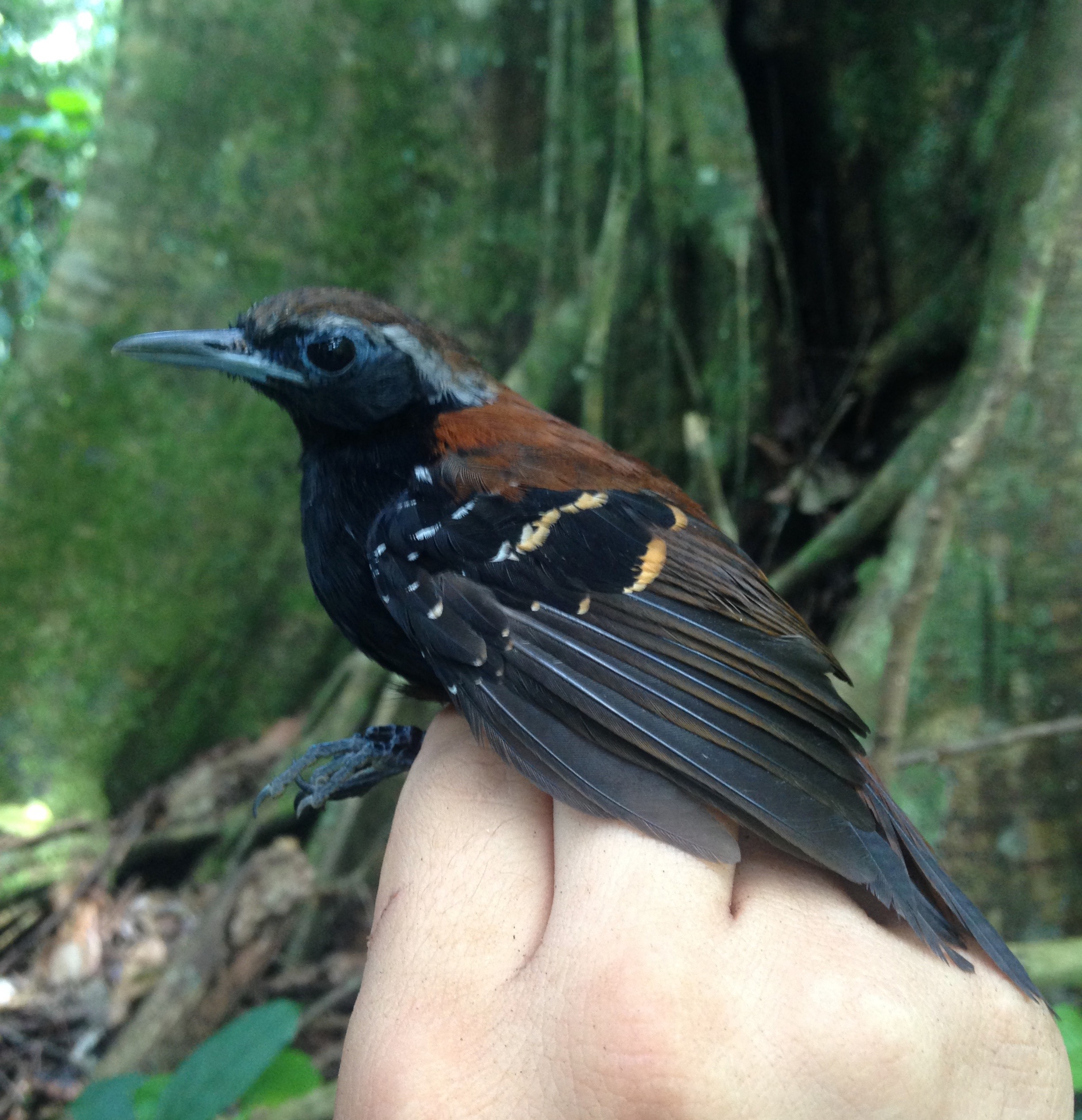

Conservation status
- Near Threatened (IUCN 3.1)

Scientific classification
- Kingdom: Animalia
- Phylum: Chordata
- Class: Aves
- Order: Passeriformes
- Family: Thamnophilidae
- Genus: Myrmoderus
- Species: M. eowilsoni

Binomial name
- Myrmoderus eowilsoni Moncrieff et al, 2017

= Cordillera Azul antbird =

Species of bird

The Cordillera Azul antbird (Myrmoderus eowilsoni) is a Near Threatened species of passerine bird in subfamily Thamnophilinae of family Thamnophilidae, the "typical antbirds". It is found only in the Cordillera Azul, San Martín Region, Peru.

== Taxonomy and systematics ==
The Cordillera Azul antbird was described in 2017 by Andre Moncrieff and colleagues and given the binomial name Myrmoderus eowilsoni. (Note: Though the journal issue is dated 2018, the article is noted as having been published in January 2017.) The specific epithet was chosen "in honor of Dr. Edward Osborne Wilson to recognize his tremendous devotion to conservation and his patronage of the Rainforest Trust". It and the ferruginous-backed antbird (M. ferrugineus) are sister species.

The Cordillera Azul antbird is monotypic.

== Description ==
The Cordillera Azul antbird is 14 to 15 cm (5.5 to 5.9 in) long and weighs 24.7 to 29.0 g (0.87 to 1.0 oz). Adult males have a warm sepia-brown crown and nape and brown upperparts with a small white patch between their scapulars. Their flight feathers are fuscous-black with brown edges. Their wing coverts are black with wide buff tips. Their tail is brown on top and fuscous below. Their eye is surrounded by bare blue-gray skin. Their forehead and lores are black and they have a pale gray supercilium on an otherwise black face. Their throat and underparts are mostly black with umber lower flanks and brown undertail coverts. They have a dark brown iris, a blackish maxilla with a blue-gray tomium, a blue-gray mandible, and dark gray legs and feet. Adult females are similar to males but with a white face and throat with black tips on the feathers, orange to amber-brown breast and sides, a dark gray center to the belly, and umber edges to the belly, flanks, and vent area.

== Distribution and habitat ==
The Cordillera Azul antbird is known only from level ridgetops in Peru's Cordillera Azul. There it inhabits tall evergreen forest that has an undisturbed understorey with much leaf litter on the ground. In elevation it ranges between 1,340 and 1,670 m (4,400 and 5,500 ft).

== Behavior ==
=== Movement ===
The Cordillera Azul antbird is believed to be a year-round resident throughout its range.

=== Feeding ===
The Cordillera Azul antbird has only been observed feeding on the ground and within 1 m (3 ft) of it. It walks and makes short flights and picks prey from leaf litter. Its diet has not been detailed but is known to include arthropods. Its diet and feeding behavior are assumed to be very similar to those of its sister ferruginous-backed antbird, which see here.

=== Breeding ===
One female Cordillera Azul antbird specimen collected in July had enlarged ovaries. Nothing else is known about the species' breeding biology.

=== Vocalization ===
Male Cordillera Azul antbirds sing "four whistled notes in two couplets (songs of 2–3 notes heard rarely), usually with the first note highest in pitch, the second lower, the third of similar or slightly higher pitch, and the final note lowest in pitch". The female's song "exhibits broader variation within and among individuals in pitch and number of notes (3–6) than males, and is delivered more slowly, often with a raspier quality". The species' call is "a sputtering series of notes".

== Status ==
The IUCN has assessed the Cordillera Azul antbird as Near Threatened. It has a limited range and its estimated population of between 7000 and 34,000 mature individuals is believed to be decreasing. "The major threat to the forests around the type locality is the extensive, large-scale clear-cutting for conversion into coffee plantations. Until now however, the Cordillera Azul National Park protects large tracts of intact forest." However, as of 2020 the species had not been seen in the park. "Consequently, survey work is urgently needed to determine the full distribution of M. eowilsoni, to assess territory size and occupancy, and to improve estimates of population size."
