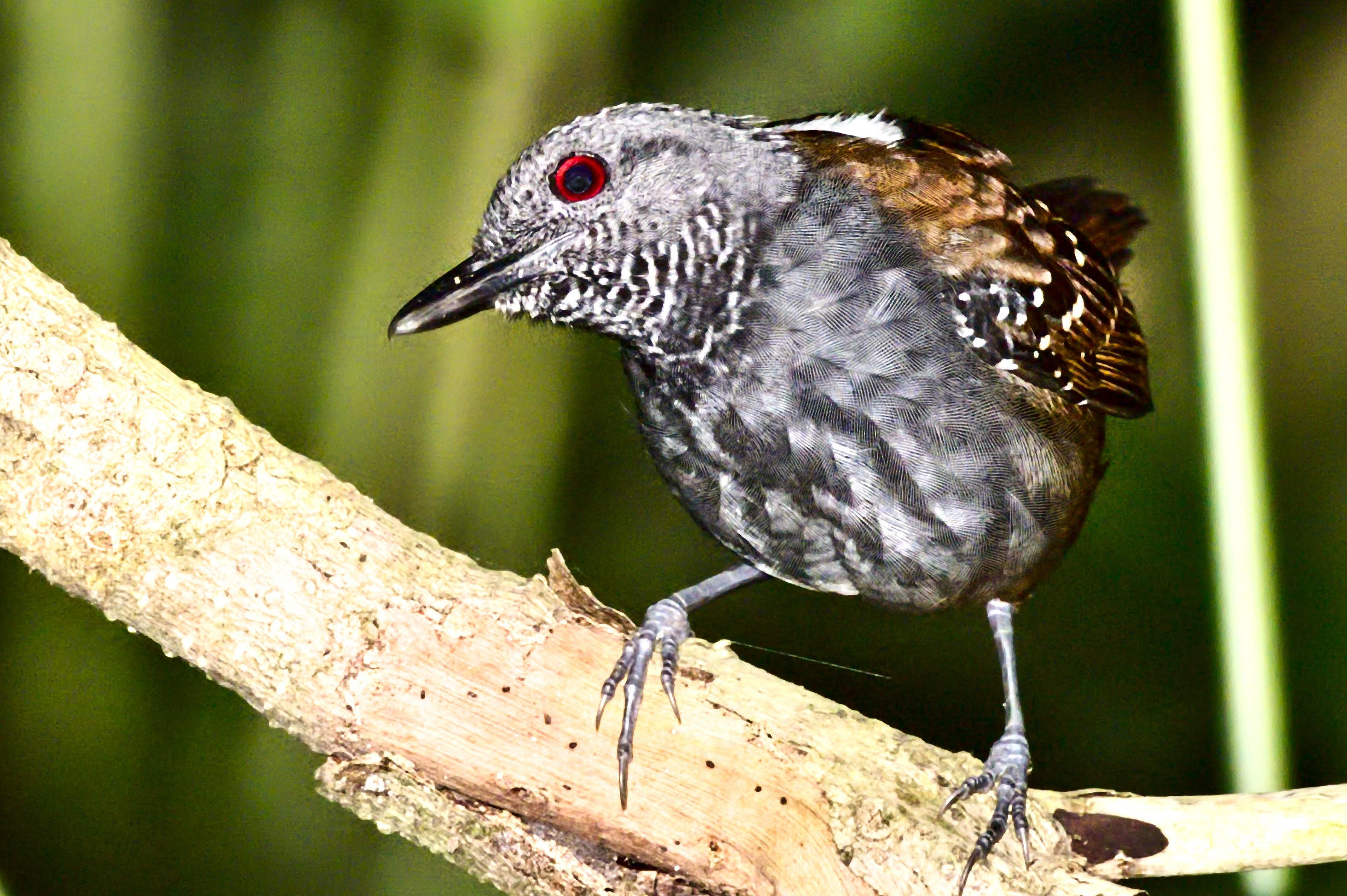

Conservation status
- Near Threatened (IUCN 3.1)

Scientific classification
- Kingdom: Animalia
- Phylum: Chordata
- Class: Aves
- Order: Passeriformes
- Family: Thamnophilidae
- Genus: Sipia
- Species: S. palliata

Binomial name
- Sipia palliata (Todd, 1917)

Synonyms
- Myrmeciza laemosticta palliata; Myrmeciza palliata

= Magdalena antbird =

Species of bird

The Magdalena antbird (Sipia palliata) is a Near Threatened species of bird in subfamily Thamnophilinae of family Thamnophilidae, the "typical antbirds". It is found in Colombia and Venezuela.

== Taxonomy and systematics ==
The Magdalena antbird was described in 1917 by the American ornithologist W. E. Clyde Todd as a subspecies of the dull-mantled antbird and given the trinomial name Myrmeciza laemosticta palliata. Based on the results of a study of the vocal characteristics and mitochondrial DNA published in 2010, the Magdalena antbird was promoted to species status. A molecular phylogenetic study published in 2013 found that the genus Myrmeciza, as then defined, was polyphyletic. In the resulting rearrangement to create monophyletic genera, the Magdalena antbird and several other species were moved to a resurrected genus Sipia that had been introduced by the Austrian ornithologist Carl Eduard Hellmayr in 1924.

The Magdalena antbird is monotypic. Two subspecies in addition to the nominate were proposed in the mid-twentieth century but did not gain acceptance.

== Description ==
The Magdalena antbird is 13 to 16 cm (5.1 to 6.3 in) long; one male weighed 24 g (0.85 oz). Adult males have a slaty head and neck. Their upper back is brown with a usually hidden white patch between their scapulars. Their wings are brown; their wing coverts are black with buff and white dots. Their lower back, rump, and tail are chestnut. Their throat is black, their flanks and lower belly brown, and the rest of their underparts slate-gray. Adult females are similar to males but with a black and white checkered throat and buff (not white) dots on their wing coverts. Both sexes have a dark red iris.

== Distribution and habitat ==
The Magdalena antbird has a rather tortuous, and possibly disjunct distribution. In Colombia it is found from the departments of Córdoba and Cesar south in the Magdalena Valley to Caldas. Its range continues into the northwestern Venezuelan states of Zulia, Táchira, and Mérida. It primarily inhabits the floor and understorey of wet foothills evergreen forest and also occurs in lowlands nearer the coast in Colombia. It favors ravines and slopes with dense vegetation and also regenerating vegetation in landslide scars and tree-fall openings. In elevation it ranges up to 1,100 m (3,600 ft) in Colombia and occurs between 400 and 1,100 m (1,300 and 3,600 ft) in Venezuela.

== Behavior ==
=== Movement ===
The Magdalena antbird is believed to be a year-round resident throughout its range.

=== Feeding ===
The Magdalena antbird's diet has not been detailed but is assumed to be insects and other arthropods like spiders. Individuals, pairs, and family groups forage in dense vegetation mostly on the ground and also up to about 1 m (3 ft) above it. It seldom joins mixed-species feeding flocks but occasionally attends army ant swarms to capture prey that flees from the ants.

=== Breeding ===
The Magdalena antbird's breeding season has not been defined but appears to include March to May. Its eggs have been described as white with cinnamon spots. Nothing else is known about the species' breeding biology.

=== Vocalization ===
The male Magdalena antbird's song is described as similar to that of its former "parent" dull-mantled antbird, which is "a countable series...of short notes that begins with three upslurred to flat notes and abruptly switches to five evenly paced downslurred notes, e.g., tsee tsee tsee, tyew-tyew-tyew-tyew". That of the Magdalena antbird differs with a slower first section having pronounced up- and down-slurs and the addition of a third section with high-pitched notes. Females sing "a single segment of four flat notes". The species' known calls are "a single flattened and rounded note with two poorly defined overtones, and a well-defined upslurred note without any overtones".

== Status ==
The IUCN has assessed the Magdalena antbird as Near Threatened. It has a patchy distribution and an unknown population size that is believed to be decreasing. "This species occupies a region that is subject to extensive land-use change. The middle and lower Magdalena valley has been extensively deforested since the 19th century for agriculture and coffee plantations, and clearance of its foothills has been near total since the 1950s. The species is increasingly exposed to human encroachment and disturbance, which is projected to continue." "Much of the area previously occupied in northwest Venezuela is now heavily deforested, with few recent records there."
