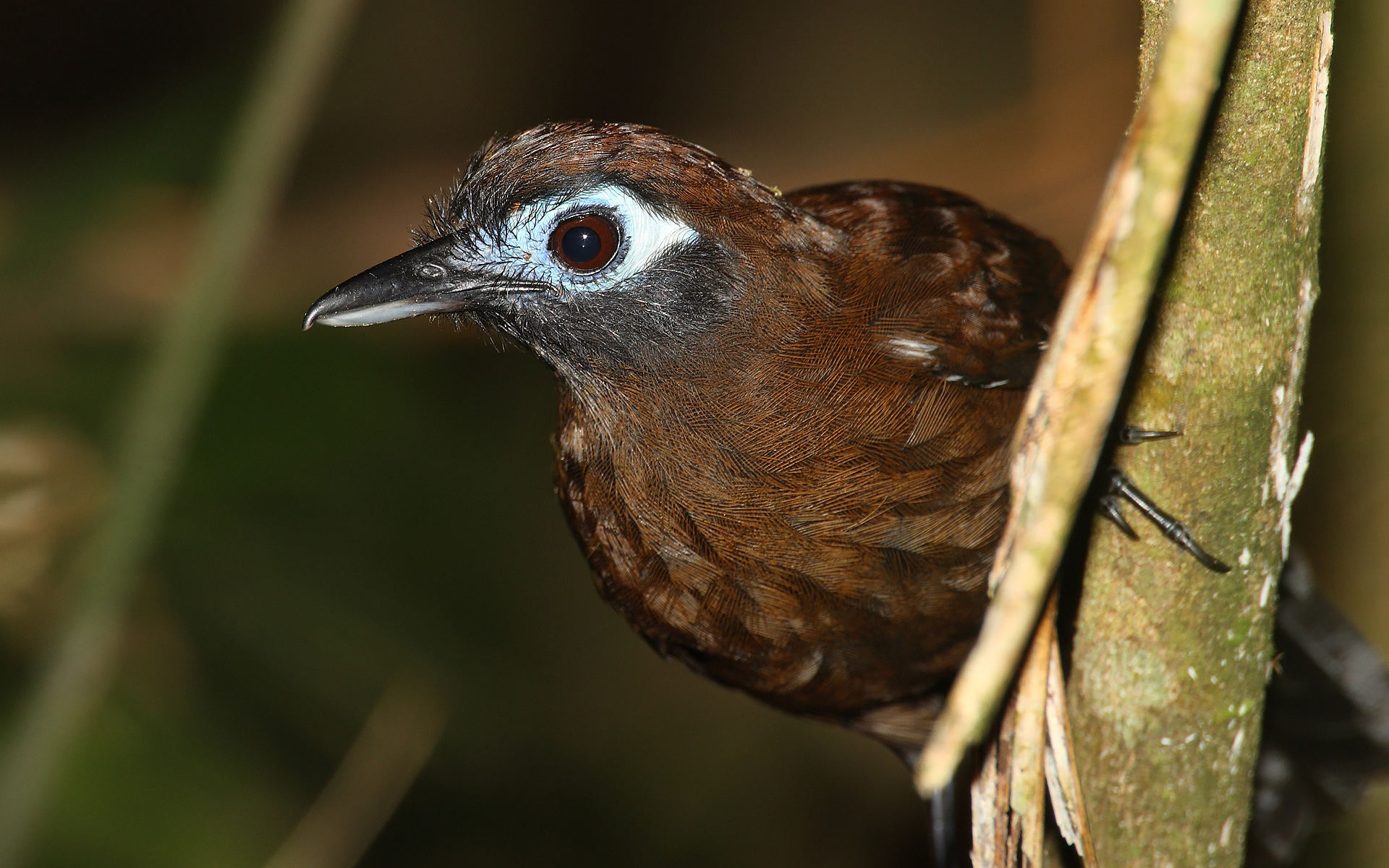
- Female

Conservation status
- Least Concern (IUCN 3.1)

Scientific classification
- Kingdom: Animalia
- Phylum: Chordata
- Class: Aves
- Order: Passeriformes
- Family: Thamnophilidae
- Genus: Hafferia
- Species: H. immaculata

Binomial name
- Hafferia immaculata (Lafresnaye, 1845)

Synonyms
- Turdus immaculatus; Percnostola immaculata; Myrmeciza immaculata

= Blue-lored antbird =

Species of bird

The blue-lored antbird (Hafferia immaculata) is a species of antbird in subfamily Thamnophilinae of family Thamnophilidae, the "typical antbirds". It is found in Colombia and Venezuela.

== Taxonomy and systematics ==
The blue-lored antbird was described in 1845 as Turdus immaculatus. It was later included in genera Percnostola and Myrmeciza. A molecular phylogenetic study published in 2013 found that Myrmeciza, as then defined, was polyphyletic. In the resulting rearrangement to create monophyletic genera, the blue-lored antbird was moved to the newly erected genus Hafferia.

Until about 2012 Myrmeciza immaculata was called the immaculate antbird. It included what is now the blue-lored antbird as its nominate subspecies and what is now Zeledon's antbird (H. zeledoni) as two other subspecies. The current blue-lored antbird has two subspecies, the nominate H. i. immaculata (Lafresnaye, 1845) and H. i. concepcion (Donegan, 2012).

== Description ==
The blue-lored antbird is 18 to 19 cm (7.1 to 7.5 in) long and weighs about 39 to 44 g (1.4 to 1.6 oz). Both sexes have pale blue lores, a ring of bare pale blue skin around their eye, and a deep red iris. Adult males of the nominate subspecies are mostly very dark gray with a hidden white line at the bend of the wing. Adult females have a dark reddish brown crown, upperparts, and wings. Their tail is blackish. Their forehead, face, and upper throat are blackish. Their underparts are a paler and grayer reddish brown than their upperparts. Subadult males resemble adult females. Subspecies H. i. concepcion has few differences from the nominate. Males appear to have a larger area of blue skin on their lores and forehead. Females are less rufous and their flanks and undertail coverts are paler.

== Distribution and habitat ==
The blue-lored antbird has a disjunct distribution. The nominate subspecies is found in Colombia's Serranía del Perijá, Colombia's Eastern Andes, and in Venezuela's Lara, Mérida, and Táchira states. Subspecies H. i. concepcion is found further west in Colombia, in Bolívar Department's Serranía de San Lucas and in the Central Andes as far south as eastern Valle de Cauca and northwestern Tolima departments. The species inhabits the understorey and edges of humid evergreen forest and mature secondary forest. It mostly occurs in regenerating landslides and tree-falls on steep hillsides and ravines. In elevation it ranges between about 500 and 2,100 m (1,600 and 6,900 ft) in Colombia and 900 and 1,700 m (3,000 and 5,600 ft) in Venezuela.

== Behavior ==
=== Movement ===
The blue-lored antbird is believed to be a year-round resident throughout its range.

=== Feeding ===
The blue-lored antbird feeds on a variety of insects, other arthropods, and probably also small vertebrates. It typically forages singly, in pairs, or in family groups in dense vegetation, mostly on the ground and within about 1 m (3 ft) above it. It hops between short feeding stops, pumping its tail. It regularly follows army ant swarms to capture prey fleeing the ants and only occasionally joins mixed-species feeding flocks.

=== Breeding ===
Nothing is known about the blue-lored antbird's breeding biology.

=== Vocalization ===
The song of the blue-lored antbird's nominate subspecies is "a series of rather long, evenly paced, slightly downslurred whistles...on same pitch, first note less intense, notes shorten slightly". That of H. i. concepcion is similar but slower, with shorter and somewhat less downslurred notes. The nominate's calls are "a short...'tweet' rising and falling in pitch" and a one-second rattle, and are never given by a pair in duet. The single-note calls of H. i. concepcion are often given in duet.

== Status ==
The IUCN has assessed the blue-lored antbird as being of Least Concern. It has a large range; its population size is not known and is believed to be decreasing. No immediate threats have been identified. It is not well known but believed to be uncommon across its range, which includes several large protected areas. It is "also found in extensive intact habitat that is not formally protected" though some parts of Colombia "have incurred habitat losses of 25–30% over the last 10–20 years, suggesting that this species could be Near Threatened".
