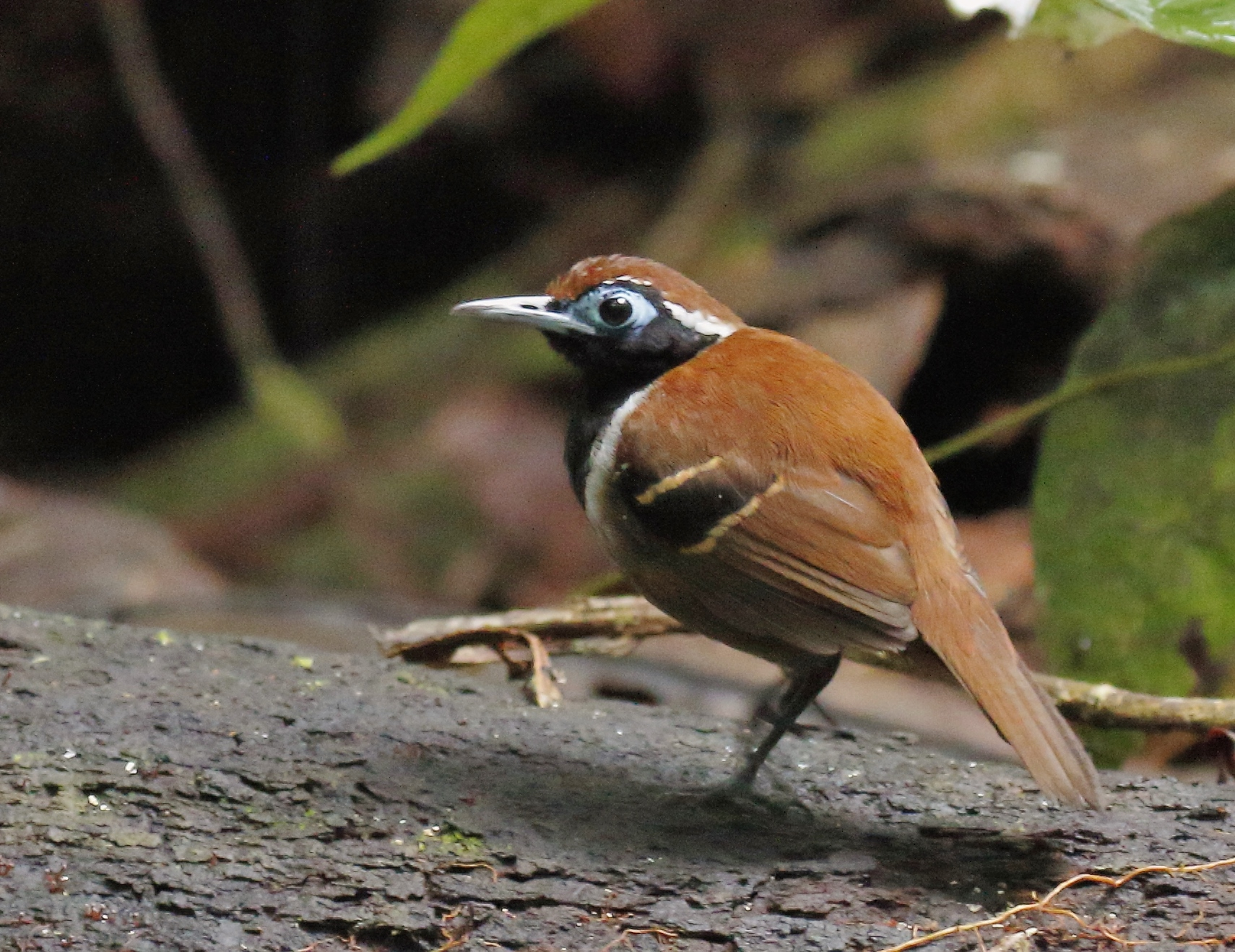
- Male at Presidente Figueiredo, Amazonas state, Brazil
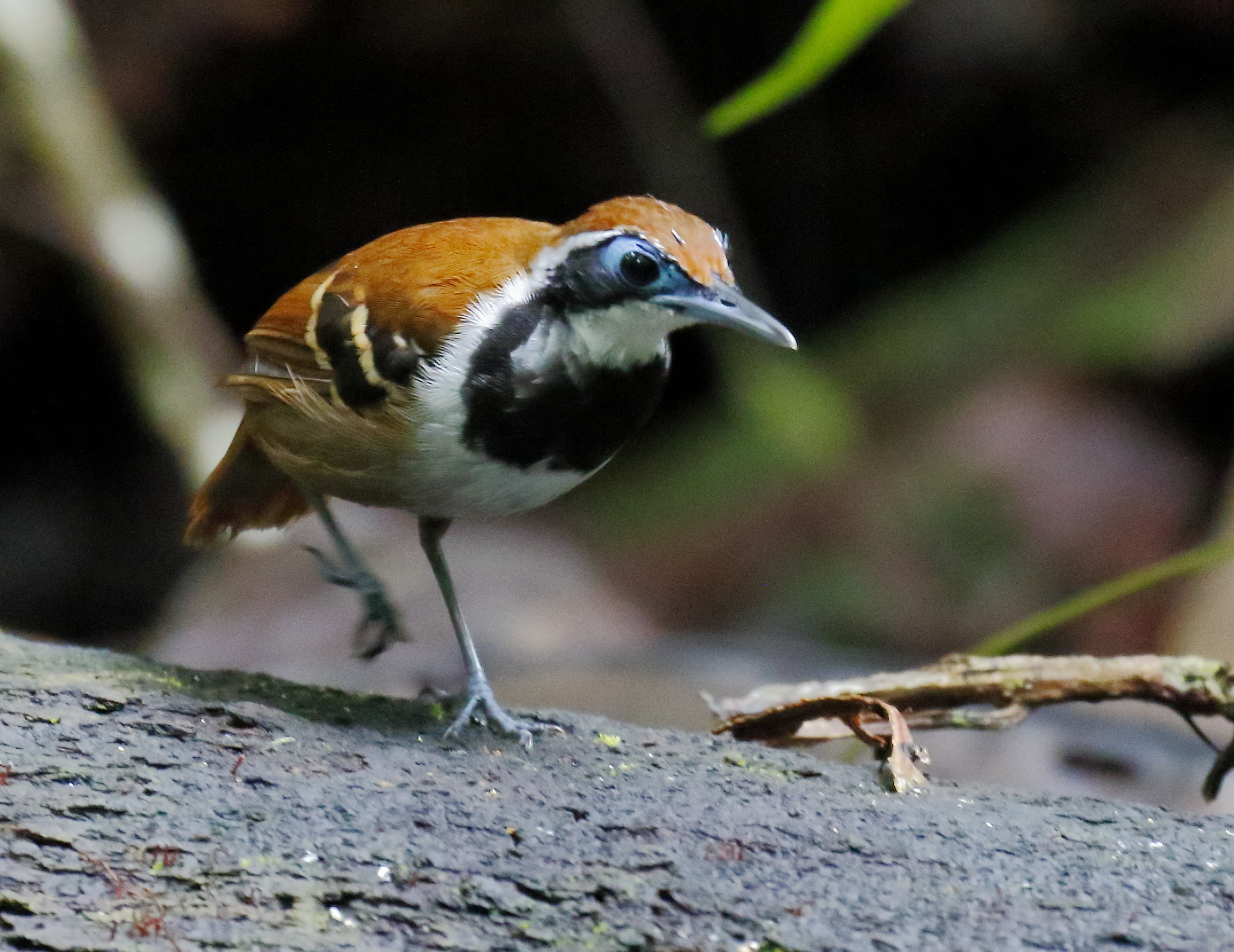
- Memale at Presidente Figueiredo, Amazonas state, Brazil

Conservation status
- Least Concern (IUCN 3.1)

Scientific classification
- Kingdom: Animalia
- Phylum: Chordata
- Class: Aves
- Order: Passeriformes
- Family: Thamnophilidae
- Genus: Myrmoderus
- Species: M. ferrugineus

Binomial name
- Myrmoderus ferrugineus (Statius Müller, PL, 1776)

Synonyms
- Myrmeciza ferruginea

= Ferruginous-backed antbird =

Species of bird

The ferruginous-backed antbird (Myrmoderus ferrugineus) is a species of passerine bird in subfamily Thamnophilinae of family Thamnophilidae, the "typical antbirds". It is found in Brazil, French Guyana, Guyana, Suriname, and Venezuela.

== Taxonomy and systematics ==
The ferruginous-backed antbird was formerly included in the genus Myrmeciza. A molecular phylogenetic study published in 2013 found that Myrmeciza, as then defined, was polyphyletic. In the resulting rearrangement to create monophyletic genera, four species including the ferruginous-backed antbird were moved to the resurrected genus Myrmoderus.

The ferruginous-backed antbird has two subspecies, the nominate M. f. ferrugineus (Statius Müller, PL, 1776) and M. f. elutus (Zimmer, J.T., 1927).

== Description ==
The ferruginous-backed antbird is 14 to 15 cm (5.5 to 5.9 in) long and weighs 24 to 29 g (0.85 to 1.0 oz). Adult males of the nominate subspecies have a bright chestnut crown, upperparts, and flight feathers. Their wing coverts are black with wide pale cinnamon-buff tips. Their tail is rufous-brown. Their eye is surrounded by bare blue skin. Their face, throat, breast, and upper belly are black with a white line separating them from the chestnut of the upperparts. The center of their belly is gray and their flanks, lower belly, and crissum are reddish yellow-brown. Adult females are similar but with a white chin and throat, a light gray (not black) belly, and a paler crissum. Both sexes of subspecies M. f. elutus have paler lower underparts than the nominate and females have a whiter belly.

== Distribution and habitat ==
The nominate subspecies of the ferruginous-backed antbird is found from the Caroní River in far eastern Venezuela east through the Guianas. Its range extends into northeastern Amazonian Brazil north of the Amazon between the Branco River and Negro River. Subspecies M. f. elutus is found in Brazil south of the Amazon between the Madeira and Tapajós rivers and south to the Roosevelt and upper Dos Marmelos rivers. The species primarily inhabits terra firme evergreen forest and nearby mature secondary forest, but also savanna woodland on sandy soils.

== Behavior ==
=== Movement ===
The ferruginous-backed antbird is believed to be a year-round resident throughout its range.

=== Feeding ===
The ferruginous-backed antbird's diet has not been detailed but is known to include insects and spiders. Primarily pairs, but also individuals and family groups, forage almost entirely on the ground and rarely up to about 1.5 m (5 ft) above it. They usually walk, and sometimes hop, on the ground, along fallen logs, and among the branches of fallen trees. They capture most prey by gleaning from leaf litter, stems and branches, and the underside of live leaves; they also regularly jump to take prey from higher surfaces. They often follow army ant swarms, usually for only a short time.

=== Breeding ===
The ferruginous-backed antbird's breeding season has not been fully defined but appears to include at least September to March. Its nest is a cup, variously constructed of plant fibers, rootlets, and dead leaves. It is built on the ground, sometimes under overhanging vegetation. The clutch is two eggs; they are creamy and covered with purplish lines. The incubation period, time to fledging, and details of parental care are not known.

=== Vocalization ===
The male ferruginous-backed antbird's song is a "short, very high, increasing, decelerating 'tjutju-tee-tee-teeh', level pitched after the 'tjutju' ". The species' calls "include variable-length rattles, often one after the other".

== Status ==
The IUCN has assessed the ferruginous-backed antbird as being of Least Concern. It has a very large range; its population size is not known and is believed to be stable. Not immediate threats have been identified. It is considered fairly common in most of its range. It occurs in several protected areas, and "also extensive areas of suitable habitat which, although not formally protected, are at little risk being developed in near future".
