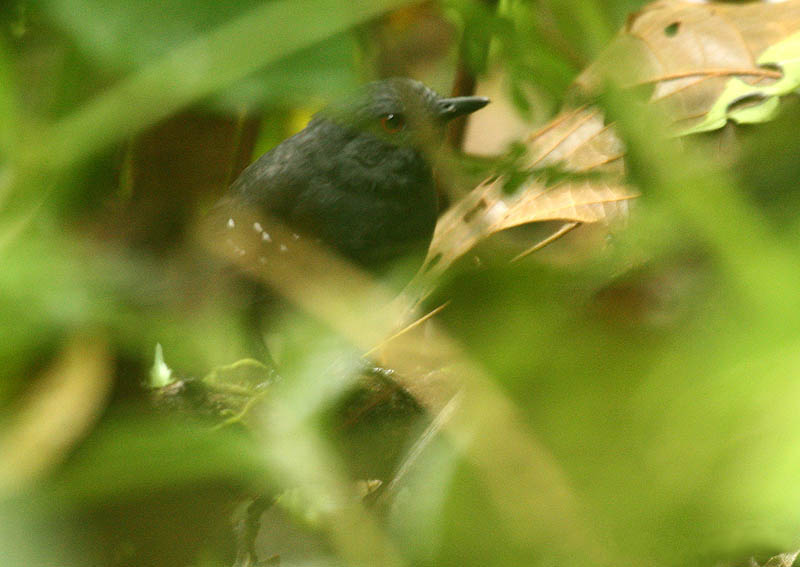
- Male in northwestern Ecuador

Conservation status
- Least Concern (IUCN 3.1)

Scientific classification
- Kingdom: Animalia
- Phylum: Chordata
- Class: Aves
- Order: Passeriformes
- Family: Thamnophilidae
- Genus: Sipia
- Species: S. nigricauda

Binomial name
- Sipia nigricauda (Salvin & Godman, 1892)

Synonyms
- Myrmeciza nigricauda; Myrmeciza laemosticta nigricauda; Sipia rosenbergi (in part)

= Esmeraldas antbird =

Species of bird

The Esmeraldas antbird (Sipia nigricauda) is a species of bird in subfamily Thamnophilinae of family Thamnophilidae, the "typical antbirds". It is found in Colombia and Ecuador.

== Taxonomy and systematics ==
The Esmeraldas antbird has a complicated taxonomic history. It was described by the naturalists Osbert Salvin and Frederick DuCane Godman in 1892 and given the binomial name Myrmeciza nigricauda. It was later reassigned as a subspecies of Myrmeciza laemosticta. At about the same time, M. laemosticta was moved into a new genus, Sipia. The original description was of a female bird and this was later the source of taxonomic confusion. The male bird was considered a different species (Sipia rosenbergi) until in 1991 it was realized that the two taxa were simply the male and female forms of the same species. The authors of the 1991 paper promoted nigricauda to species rank and by the principle of priority the specific epithet rosenbergi disappeared. In addition, the authors merged Sipia back into Myrmeciza. A molecular phylogenetic study published in 2013 found that the genus Myrmeciza, as then defined, was polyphyletic. In the resulting rearrangement to create monophyletic genera, genus Sipia was resurrected, and the Esmeraldas antbird and several other species were moved to it.

The Esmeraldas antbird is monotypic.

== Description ==
The Esmeraldas antbird is 13 to 14 cm (5.1 to 5.5 in) long and weighs 22 to 23 g (0.78 to 0.81 oz). Adult males are mostly dark gray, with a white patch between their scapulars, darker wings and tail, and black wing coverts with white tips. Adult females have a dark gray head and neck. They have dark reddish brown upperparts, dark brown flight feathers with wide dark rufous-brown edges, and a rufous wash on their tail. Their throat is barred with black and white, their breast is dark gray, and their belly to their undertail coverts is ochre-brown. Both sexes have a red iris.

== Distribution and habitat ==
The Esmeraldas antbird is found on the Pacific slope from central Chocó Department in western Colombia south into Ecuador's El Oro Province. It is a bird of the Chocó Endemic Bird Area. There it inhabits the floor and understorey of wet evergreen forest and adjacent mature secondary forest in the foothills. It favors ravines and slopes with dense vegetation and also regenerating vegetation in landslide scars and tree-fall openings. In elevation it ranges up to 1,200 m (3,900 ft) in Colombia and mostly occurs between 500 and 1,100 m (1,600 and 3,600 ft) in Ecuador. Locally it occurs as low as 150 m (500 ft) and as high as 1,500 m (4,900 ft).

== Behavior ==
=== Movement ===
The Esmeraldas antbird is believed to be a year-round resident throughout its range.

=== Feeding ===
The Esmeraldas antbird feeds primarily on insects and probably includes other arthropods in its diet. Individuals, pairs, and family groups forage in dense vegetation on the ground and up to about 1 m (3 ft) above it. It seldom joins mixed-species feeding flocks but occasionally attends army ant swarms to capture prey that flees from the ants.

=== Breeding ===
The Esmeraldas antbird's breeding season has not been defined but appears to end in June. Its eggs have been described as pinkish with reddish brown and purple markings. Nothing else is known about the species' breeding biology.

=== Vocalization ===
The Esmeraldas antbird's song is "a short series of very high-pitched, thin, and sharp notes, well enunciated but not very farcarrying, 'psee-pseé-psi-psi-psi-pseé' ". Usually the second note, and always the last note, are higher pitched and emphasized. The species' call is "a sharp but nasal and falling 'skweeyr' or 'sk-kweeyr' ".

== Status ==
The IUCN has assessed the Esmeraldas antbird as being of Least Concern. Its population size is not known and is believed to be decreasing. No immediate threats have been identified. It is considered uncommon in Colombia and uncommon to locally fairly common in Ecuador. "Although large expanses of intact, suitable habitat still exist within its range, relatively little of it is formally protected...Establishment of more reserves in the species-rich lowlands and foothills of Pacific slope of Colombia and Ecuador is needed."
