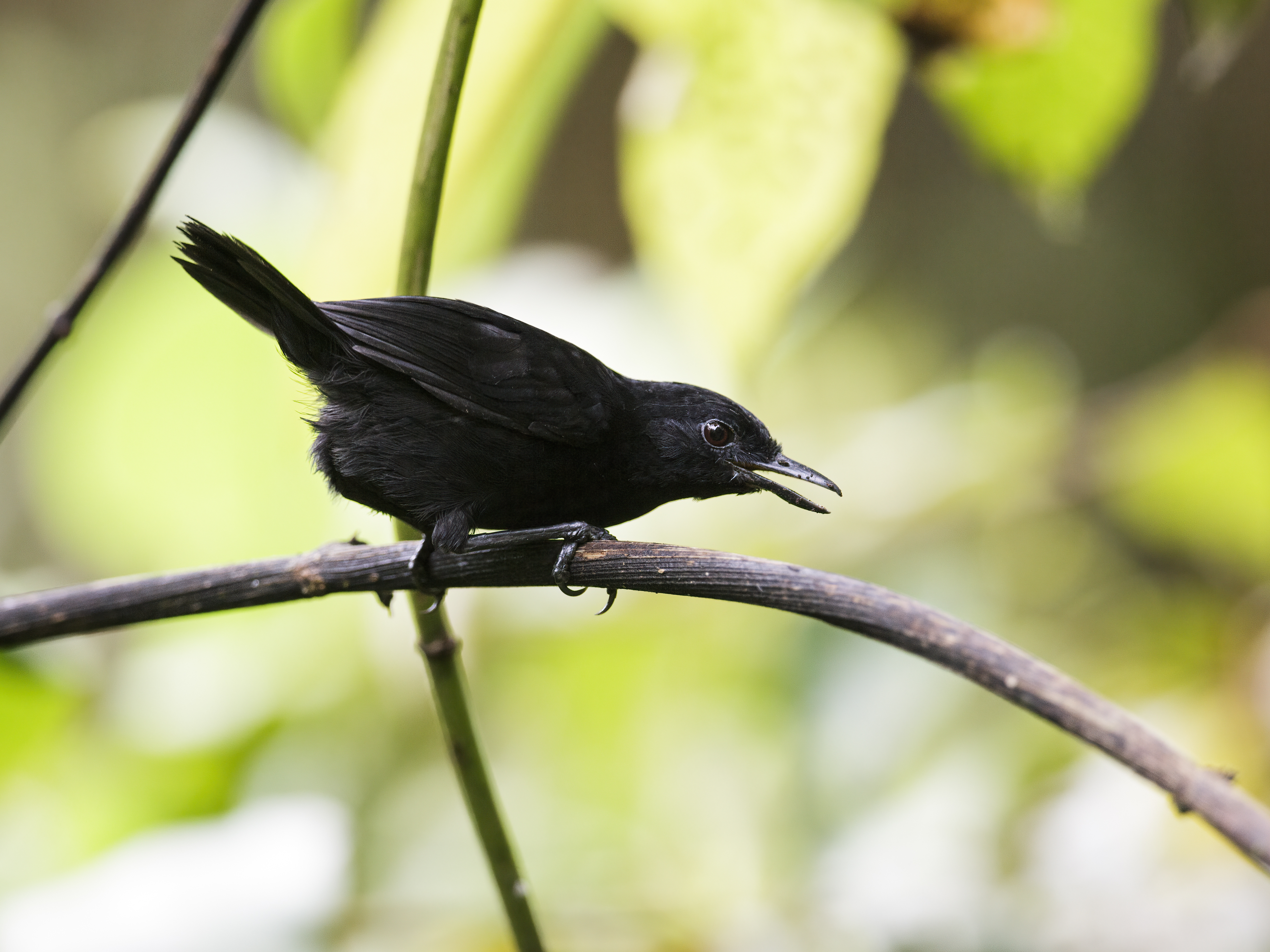

Conservation status
- Least Concern (IUCN 3.1)

Scientific classification
- Kingdom: Animalia
- Phylum: Chordata
- Class: Aves
- Order: Passeriformes
- Family: Thamnophilidae
- Genus: Sipia
- Species: S. berlepschi

Binomial name
- Sipia berlepschi (Hartert, 1898)

Synonyms
- Myrmeciza berlepschi

= Stub-tailed antbird =

Species of bird

The stub-tailed antbird (Sipia berlepschi) is a species of bird in subfamily Thamnophilinae of family Thamnophilidae, the "typical antbirds". It is found in Colombia and Ecuador.

== Taxonomy and systematics ==
The stub-tailed antbird has a complicated taxonomic history. It was described by the German ornithologist Ernst Hartert in 1898 and given the binomial name Pyriglena berlepschi. The species was named to honor the German ornithologist Hans von Berlepsch. In 1924 it was moved to genus Sipia, and later Sipia was merged into genus Myrmeciza. A molecular phylogenetic study published in 2013 found that genus Myrmeciza, as then defined, was polyphyletic. In the resulting rearrangement to create monophyletic genera, genus Sipia was resurrected, and the stub-tailed antbird and several other species were moved to it. The stub-tailed antbird is monotypic.

== Description ==
The stub-tailed antbird is 13.5 to 14.5 cm (5.3 to 5.7 in) long. Adult males are almost entirely black, with a white patch between their scapulars. Adult females are also mostly black, with white dots on the tips of their wing coverts and white spots on their throat, breast, and upper belly. Those on the belly sometimes have a scaly pattern. Both sexes have a deep red iris.

== Distribution and habitat ==
The stub-tailed antbird is found from central Chocó Department in western Colombia, south into northwestern Ecuador's Esmeraldas Province. It is a bird of the Chocó Endemic Bird Area. There it inhabits the understorey of evergreen forest in the wet lowlands and foothills. It favors the forest edge, overgrown openings within the forest, and adjacent mature secondary forest. In elevation it mostly ranges from near sea level to 400 m (1,300 ft), though locally it reaches 650 m (2,100 ft).

Research by Morton Isler, along with Gustavo Bravo and Robb Brumfield (2013), showed that stub-tailed antbirds have formed their own lineage. This disagreed with the placement with the Mymeciza family.

== Behavior ==
=== Movement ===
The stub-tailed antbird is believed to be a year-round resident throughout its range.

=== Feeding ===
The stub-tailed antbird feeds primarily on insects and probably includes other arthropods in its diet. Individuals, pairs, and family groups forage in dense vegetation on the ground and up to about 2 m (7 ft) above it. It seldom joins mixed-species feeding flocks but sometimes attends army ant swarms to capture prey that flees from the ants.

In the 2013 taxonomic revision of the antbird family, Sipia berlepschi was distinguished from related genera in part on the basis of its shorter tail and distinctive foraging behaviour in tangled understory near fallen logs, which supported its placement in the resurrected genus Sipia.

=== Breeding ===
Nothing is known about the stub-tailed antbird's breeding biology.

=== Vocalization ===
The stub-tailed antbird's song is "a series of downslurred notes that first drop and then rise in pitch, e.g., 'chi-chu-chu-chu-chew-chéw-chéw-chéw' ". Its calls include "a sharp 'chit' and a 'ch-dit' ".

== Status ==
The IUCN has assessed the stub-tailed antbird as being of Least Concern. Its population size is not known and is believed to be stable. No immediate threats have been identified. It is considered uncommon in Colombia and uncommon to locally fairly common in Ecuador. "Most existing Chocó reserves are centred on montane areas, leaving the biologically diverse lowlands and lower foothills relatively unprotected. Establishment of more reserves in this elevational zone is needed."
