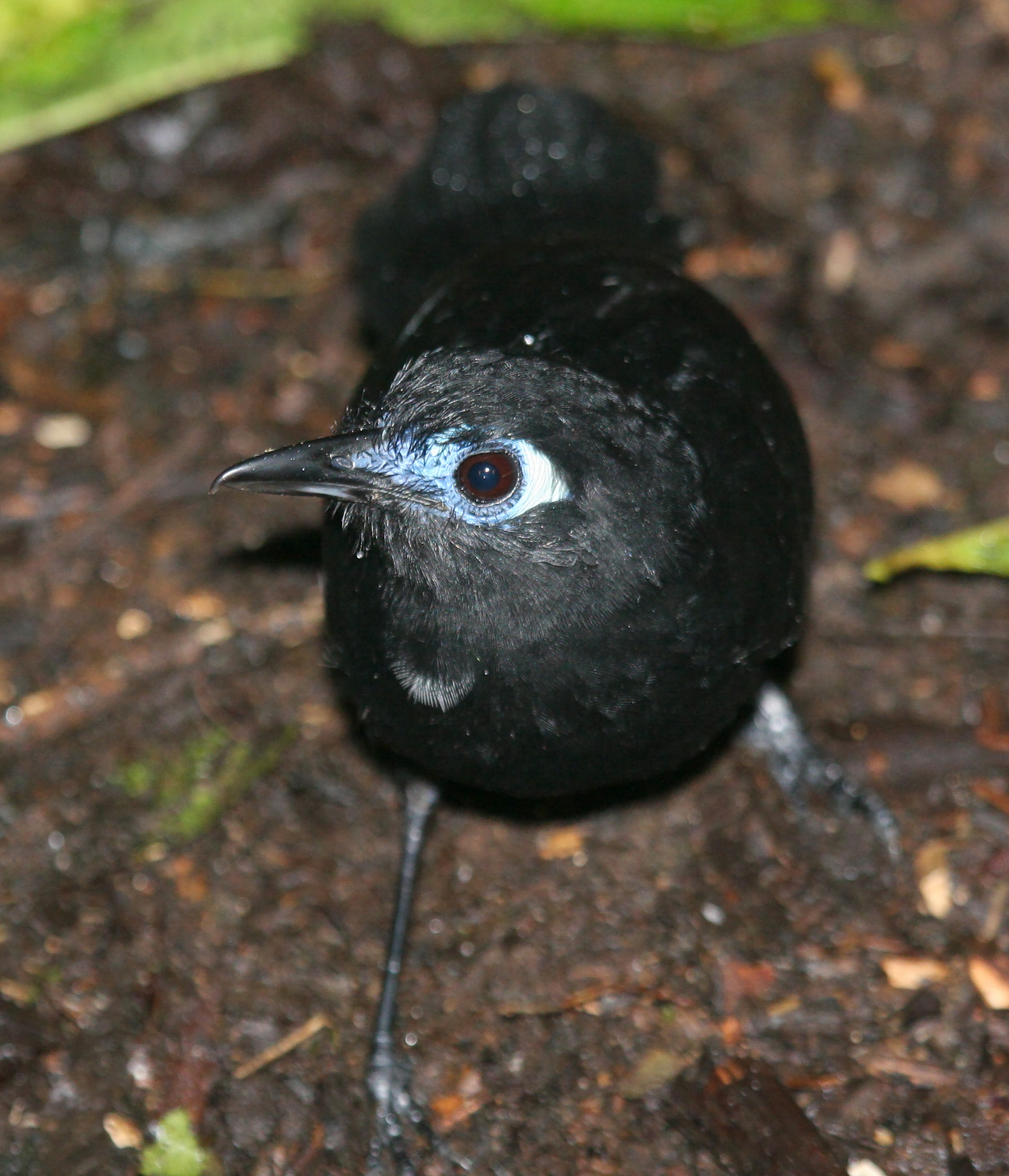
- Male
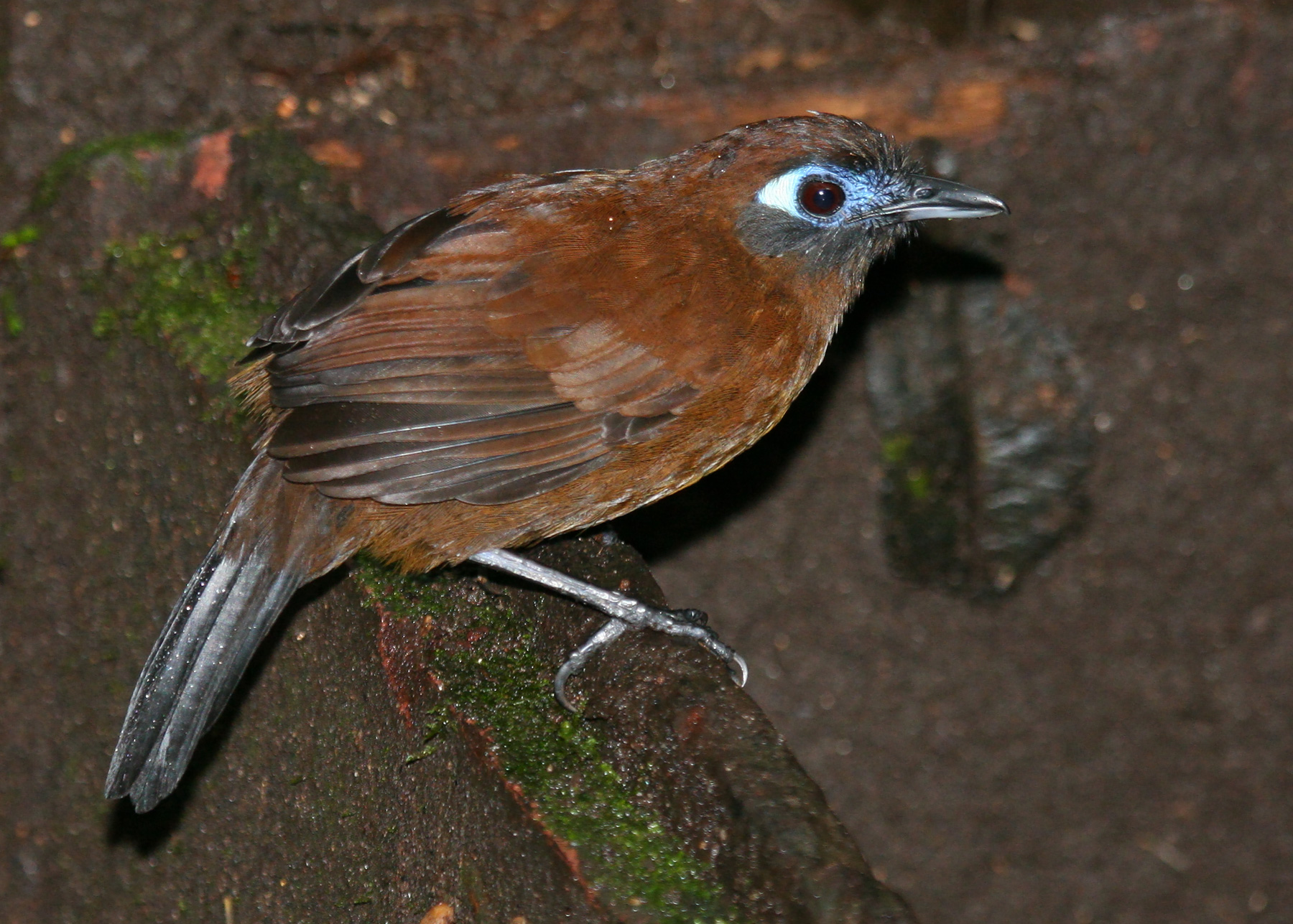
- Female

Conservation status
- Least Concern (IUCN 3.1)

Scientific classification
- Kingdom: Animalia
- Phylum: Chordata
- Class: Aves
- Order: Passeriformes
- Family: Thamnophilidae
- Genus: Hafferia
- Species: H. zeledoni

Binomial name
- Hafferia zeledoni (Ridgway, 1909)

Synonyms
- Myrmeciza zeledoni; Myrmeciza berlepschi; Myrmeciza immaculata zeledoni; Myrmeciza immaculata berlepschi

= Zeledon's antbird =

Species of bird

Zeledon's antbird (Hafferia zeledoni) is a species of bird in subfamily Thamnophilinae of family Thamnophilidae, the "typical antbirds". It is found in Colombia, Costa Rica, Ecuador, Nicaragua, and Panama.

== Taxonomy and systematics ==
Zeledon's antbird has two subspecies, the nominate Hafferia z. zeledoni and H. z. berlepschi. American ornithologist Robert Ridgway described them in 1909 in the same paper as separate species, Myrmeciza zeledoni and M. berlepschi. Both taxa were later treated as subspecies of Myrmeciza immaculata, which was at the time called the immaculate antbird. Beginning in 2012 the immaculate antbird was split into what are now the blue-lored antbird (H. immaculata with two subspecies) and Zeledon's antbird with its two subspecies. A molecular phylogenetic study published in 2013 found that genus Myrmeciza was polyphyletic. In the resulting rearrangement to create monophyletic genera, Zeledon's antbird was moved to the newly erected genus Hafferia.

The species' English name and specific epithet commemorate the Costa Rican ornithologist José Cástulo Zeledón.

== Description ==
Zeledon's antbird is 17 to 20 cm (6.7 to 7.9 in) long and weighs about 40 to 56 g (1.4 to 2.0 oz). Both sexes have a wide pale blue ring around their eye and a deep red iris. Adult males of the nominate subspecies are mostly black with variable amounts of white on the wing and wing coverts; the white is almost always hidden. Adult females are mostly dark brown that is paler on their underparts than above. Their lores and face are black. Males of subspecies H. z. berlepschi have more white on their wings than the nominate. Females are a paler and brighter brown than the nominate. In both subspecies the immature males look like adult females.

== Distribution and habitat ==
Zeledon's antbird has a disjunct distribution. The nominate subspecies is found from Río San Juan Department in far southern Nicaragua south through Costa Rica into Panama as far as Coclé Province. In Costa Rica it occurs mostly on the Caribbean slope and much less frequently on the Pacific slope. Subspecies H. z. berlepschi is found from eastern Darién Province in Panama south on the Pacific slope through Colombia to western Loja Province in southwestern Ecuador. The species inhabits the understorey and edges of humid evergreen forest and mature secondary forest in the foothills. It mostly occurs in regenerating landslides and tree-falls on steep hillsides and ravines. In elevation it ranges between about 250 and 1,750 m (800 and 5,700 ft) in Central America though in Costa Rica mostly above 500 m (1,600 ft) on the Caribbean side and 900 m (3,000 ft) on the Pacific side. In Colombia it occurs between 100 and 1,600 m (300 and 5,200 ft) and in Ecuador mostly below 1,400 m (4,600 ft) but locally to 2,000 m (6,600 ft).

== Behavior ==
=== Movement ===
Zeledon's antbird is believed to be a year-round resident throughout its range.

=== Feeding ===
Zeledon's antbird feeds mostly on a variety of arthropods and also on small vertebrates like lizards and frogs. It typically forages singly, in pairs, or in family groups in dense vegetation, mostly on the ground and within about 1 m (3 ft) above it. It hops between short feeding stops, pumping its tail. It captures prey by gleaning, reaching, or pouncing to the ground from a perch, with short sallies to foliage and stems, and by rummaging in leaf litter on the ground and trapped in other vegetation. It regularly follows army ant swarms to capture prey fleeing the ants, and 10 or more individuals have been seen at a swarm. It only occasionally joins mixed-species feeding flocks.

=== Breeding ===
The breeding season of Zeledon's antbird has not been detailed but appears to vary geographically. Its only known nest was a dome of dry leaves, small sticks, and dry grasses lined with dry grasses. It held two eggs that were white with reddish blotches. Both parents incubated the clutch during the day and the female alone at night and both parents provisioned the nestlings. The incubation period was at least 17 days. Fledging occurred 14 days after hatch, though the study authors caution that their handling of the nestlings might have advanced the fledging date.

=== Vocalization ===
The song of the male Zeledon's antbird is a "rapidly delivered...loud ringing and slightly descending series of clear whistled notes, 'peer-peer-peer-peer-peer-peer-peer-peer', slowing a bit toward [the] end". Both sexes "give an explosive 'cheek!' call and a fast scolding 'jee-jee-jit' ".

== Status ==
The IUCN has assessed Zeledon's antbird as being of Least Concern. It has a very large range and an estimated population of at least 50,000 mature individuals that is believed to be decreasing. No immediate threats have been identified. It is not well known and appears to be generally uncommon in most of its range. In Costa Rica it is considered "fairly uncommon" on the Caribbean slope and rare on the Pacific slope. It is considered common in Colombia. Its range includes many protected areas and "also extensive intact habitat that is not formally protected". "Most suitable habitat in Costa Rica and Panama has already been destroyed; more unprotected habitat exists in Colombia and Ecuador, but much of this has no long-term security, although the species appears to be able to persist in patchy habitat."
