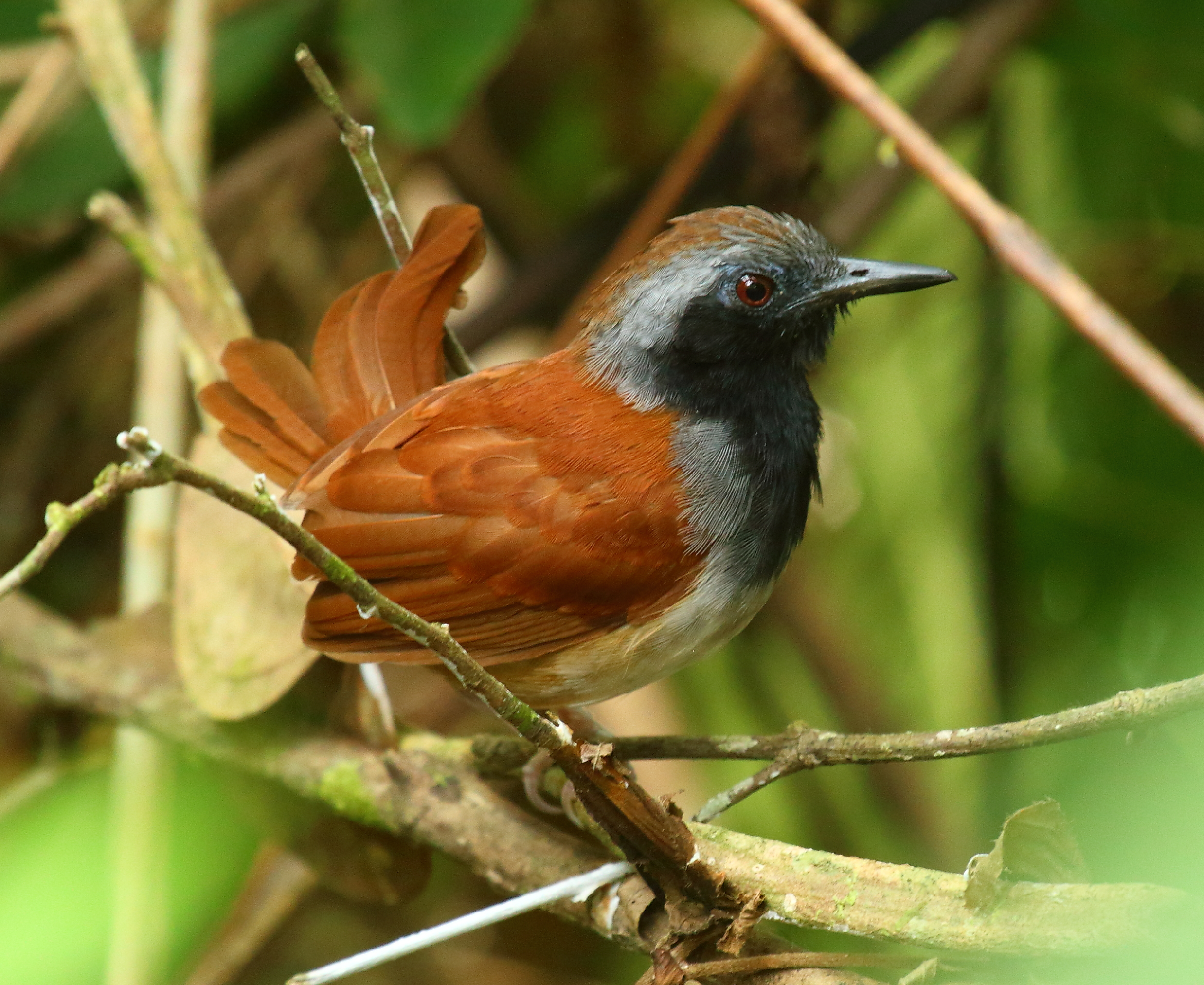
- Male near Morne La Croix, Trinidad
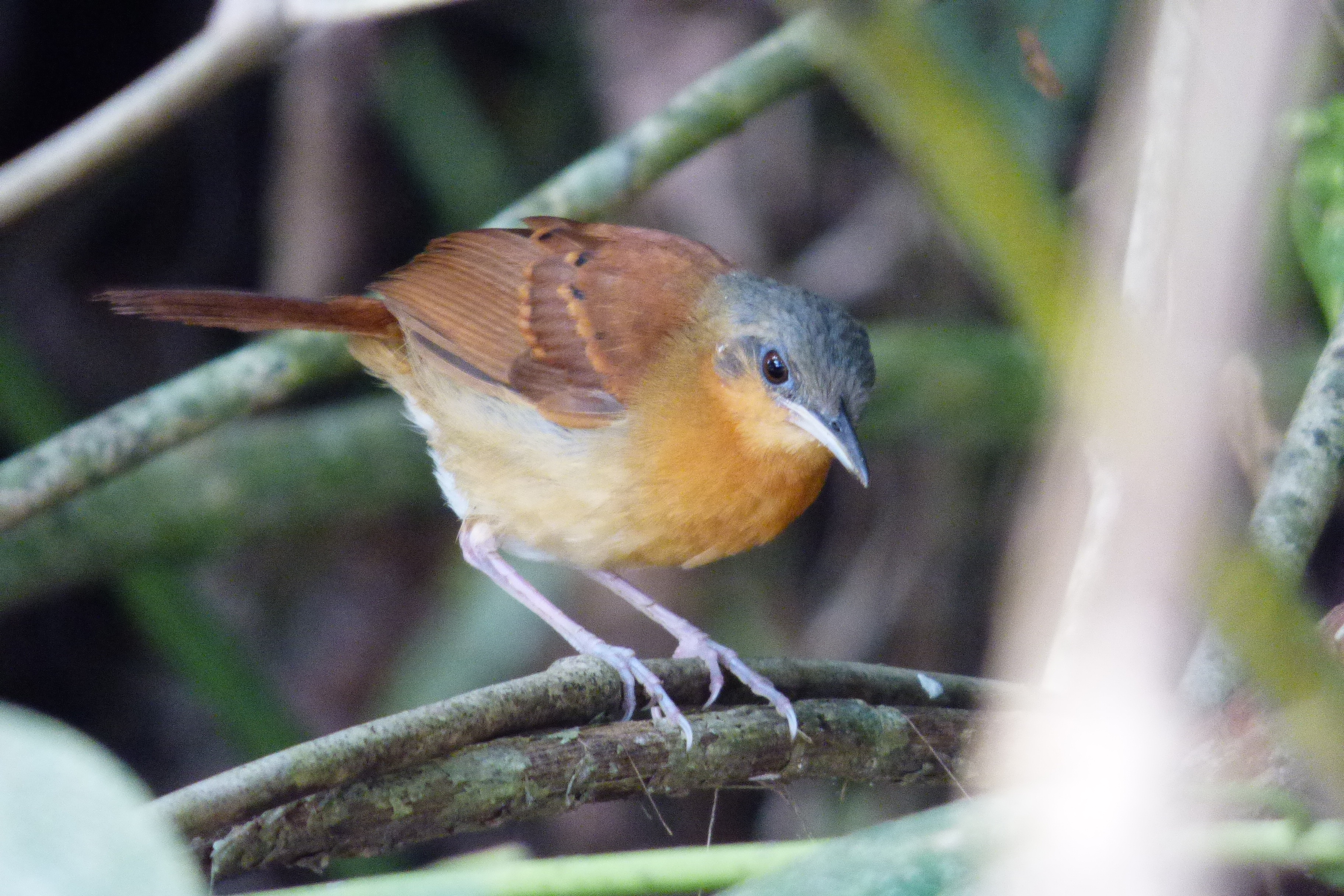
- Female

Conservation status
- Least Concern (IUCN 3.1)

Scientific classification
- Kingdom: Animalia
- Phylum: Chordata
- Class: Aves
- Order: Passeriformes
- Family: Thamnophilidae
- Genus: Myrmeciza; G.R. Gray, 1841
- Species: M. longipes

Binomial name
- Myrmeciza longipes (Swainson, 1825)

= White-bellied antbird =

Species of bird

The white-bellied antbird (Myrmeciza longipes), is a passerine bird in subfamily Thamnophilinae of family Thamnophilidae, the "typical antbirds". It is found in Panama, on Trinidad, and across northern South America. It is also called Swainson's antcatcher (usually in historical sources) after William Swainson, who first described it scientifically.

== Taxonomy and systematics ==
The white-bellied antbird was described by the English naturalist William Swainson in 1825 and given the binomial name Drymophila longipes. It was moved to genus Myrmeciza in 1841 by the English zoologist George Robert Gray with it as the type species. The genus formerly included more than 20 species. A molecular phylogenetic study published in 2013 found that Myrmeciza, as then defined, was polyphyletic. In the resulting rearrangement to create monophyletic genera, most of the species then in Myrmeciza were moved to 12 other genera leaving the white-bellied antbird as only the only member of the genus.

The name Myrmeciza derives from the Greek "myrmeco-" (ant) and "-izo" (ambush). The specific epithet also comes from Greek, "longi-" (long) and "-pes" (foot). Both are somewhat inaccurate, as the species is not an obligate army ant follower, does not specialize in eating ants, and does not have unusually long legs.

The white-bellied antbird has these four subspecies:

- M. l. panamensis Ridgway, 1908
- M. l. longipes (Swainson, 1825)
- M. l. boucardi von Berlepsch, 1888
- M. l. griseipectus von Berlepsch & Hartert, 1902

Some authors have suggested that some of the subspecies warrant treatment as full species.

== Description ==
The white-bellied antbird is about 15 cm (5.9 in) long and weighs an average of about 28 g (0.99 oz). Adult males of the nominate subspecies M. l. longipes have a cinnamon rufous crown, upperparts, wings, and tail. They have a hidden white patch between their scapulars. Their lesser wing coverts have white or pale buff edges and sometimes cinnamon tips. The sides of their head, their throat, and their upper breast are black and bordered with slate gray. Their lower breast and belly are white, their flanks tawny or buffy, and their undertail coverts tawny. Adult females have similar upperparts to males with the addition of black bars near the end of their wing coverts. The sides of their head are dark brown. Their chin is white, their throat and upper breast ochraceous buff, their lower breast and belly white, their flanks ochraceous buff, and their undertail coverts tawny ochraceous. Both sexes' legs and feet are pinkish gray.

Males of subspecies M. l. panamensis have more black and less white on their underparts than the nominate. M. l. boucardi males have a gray crown; females are richer ochraceous on their throat and breast than the nominate. M. l. griseipectus males have black extending only slightly onto their breast and also large black spots on their wing coverts. Females have more white on their belly than the nominate.

== Distribution and habitat ==
The white-bellied antbird has a disjunct distribution. The subspecies are found thus:

- M. l. panamensis: Caribbean slope of Panama from Colón Province east, Pacific slope of Panama from Coclé Province east, and northern Colombia from extreme northern Chocó Department east to La Guajira Department
- M. l. longipes: from east slope of northeastern Colombia's Eastern Andes east through northern Venezuela to Sucre state; Trinidad
- M. l. boucardi: upper Magdalena River Valley in central Colombia
- M. l. griseipectus : east of the Andes in central Colombia's Meta Department, southern and eastern Venezuela, Guyana, Suriname, and northeastern Brazil north of the Amazon from Roraima east

The white-bellied antbird primarily inhabits the floor and understorey of moderately humid semi-deciduous forest. It also occurs in deciduous forest, small tracts of more humid rainforest, gallery forest, and shrubby secondary forest. In elevation it reaches 500 m (1,600 ft) in Panama, 1,800 m (5,900 ft) in Colombia, 1,300 m (4,300 ft) in Venezuela, and 700 m (2,300 ft) in Brazil.

== Behavior ==
=== Movement ===
The white-bellied antbird is a year-round resident throughout its range.

=== Feeding ===
The white-bellied antbird feeds on a variety of insects and probably also spiders. Individuals, pairs, and family groups forage in dense vegetation mostly on the ground and also up to about 1 m (3 ft) above it. It captures prey by tossing aside and picking from leaf litter, by reaching to glean vegetation, or by jumping up to the underside of overhanging vegetation. It regularly follows army ant swarms but is not dependent on them. It seldom joins mixed-species feeding flocks.

=== Breeding ===
The white-bellied antbird's breeding season has not been fully defined and appears to vary geographically, but it overall spans at least March to June. It builds a cup nest of twigs and rootlets lined with finer fibers. Its clutch size appears to be two eggs; they are white to creamy white with brown, lilac, or purple markings.

=== Vocalization ===
The male white-bellied antbird's song is "a bright, ringing crescendo of 15-25 loud, rapid jeer notes...descending, trailing off, and ending in a few chew notes on [the] same pitch". Females sing a similar though shorter song. The species' calls include "a short, liquid rattle" and a "long...thin, downslurred whistle, sometimes abbreviated".

== Status ==
The IUCN has assessed the white-bellied antbird as being of Least Concern. It has a large range and an estimated population of at least 500,000 mature individuals. Its population is believed to be decreasing. No immediate threats have been identified. It is considered fairly common to common across its range, which includes "numerous parks and reserves in nearly every country".
