= Long-tailed antbird =

Long-tailed antbird has been split into the following species:

- East Andean antbird, Drymophila caudata
- Klages's antbird, Drymophila klagesi
- Santa Marta antbird, Drymophila hellmayri
- Streak-headed antbird, Drymophila striaticeps
