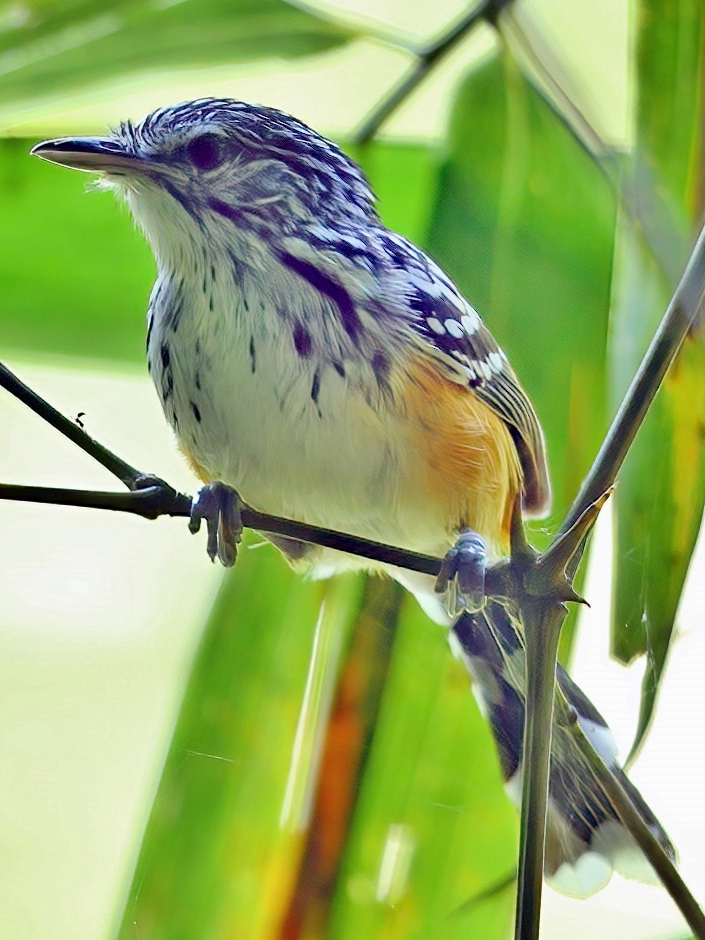

Conservation status
- Least Concern (IUCN 3.1)

Scientific classification
- Kingdom: Animalia
- Phylum: Chordata
- Class: Aves
- Order: Passeriformes
- Family: Thamnophilidae
- Genus: Drymophila
- Species: D. devillei

Binomial name
- Drymophila devillei (Ménégaux & Hellmayr, 1906)

Subspecies
- See text

= Striated antbird =

Species of bird

The striated antbird (Drymophila devillei) is a species of bird in subfamily Thamnophilinae of family Thamnophilidae, the "typical antbirds". It is found in Bolivia, Brazil, Colombia, Ecuador, and Peru.

== Taxonomy and systematics ==
The striated antbird has two subspecies, the nominate D. d. devillei (Ménégaux & Hellmayr, 1906) and D. d. subochracea (Chapman, 1921). Some authors have suggested that the subspecies deserve to be treated as full species. Subspecies D. d. subochracea has sometimes been called the "Xingu antbird", which can cause it to be confused with the Xingu scale-backed antbird (Willisornis vidua). The striated antbird and the East Andean antbird are sister species.

== Description ==
The striated antbird is 13 to 14 cm (5.1 to 5.5 in) long and weighs 10 to 12 g (0.35 to 0.42 oz). Adult males of the nominate subspecies have a black crown and back with thin white streaks and a large white patch between the scapulars. Their rump is orangish buff. Their flight feathers are slate gray with cinnamon edges and their wing coverts black with white tips. Their tail is black with wide white tips to the feathers and large white spots on the innermost pair. Their face, throat, and underparts are white with bold black streaks on the face, sides of the neck, and breast. Females have the same pattern but different colors than males. Their upperparts have buff rather than white streaks; their underparts are pale buff with thin black streaks on the breast. Juveniles have olive-gray upperparts and buff-tinged underparts with an olive-gray band on the breast. Subadult males resemble adult females. Both sexes of subspecies D. d. subochracea have ochraceous buff underparts that are darker on the breast and flanks. Females have darker ochraceous streaks on their upperparts than the nominate. Adults of both sexes of both subspecies have a brown iris, a black maxilla, a gray to blue-gray mandible, and blue-gray legs and feet.

== Distribution and habitat ==
The nominate subspecies of the striated antbird has a disjunct distribution. It occurs locally within a thin band from Meta Department in southeastern Colombia into northern Ecuador's Napo Province. It separately occurs in a larger area from southeastern Peru south into Bolivia as far as Cochabamba Department and east into Brazil to the Rio Madeira. Subspecies D. d. subochracea is found in Brazil south of the Amazon and east of the rios Madeira and Mamoré south into northeastern Bolivia's Santa Cruz Department. The species inhabits the understorey of humid evergreen forest where it is almost entirely found in stands of Guadua bamboo. In elevation it reaches 1,000 m (3,300 ft) in Brazil and 1,300 m (4,300 ft) in Peru. In Ecuador it occurs between 300 and 750 m (1,000 and 2,500 ft) and in Colombia between 300 and 1,000 m (1,000 and 3,300 ft).

== Behavior ==
=== Movement ===
The striated antbird is believed to be a year-round resident throughout its range.

=== Feeding ===
The striated antbird's diet is not known in detail; it feeds primarily on insects (with a possible preference for caterpillars) and probably also on spiders. It typically forages in pairs or in family groups, feeding in the crowns of bamboo thickets usually up to about 7 m (25 ft) above the ground though sometimes as high as 20 m (65 ft). It much of its range it regularly joins mixed-species feeding flocks that pass through its territory. However, it is not known to do so in Colombia and data from Ecuador are lacking.

=== Breeding ===
Except for a sighting of a female entering a dome-shaped nest in bamboo, the striated antbird's breeding biology is unknown.

=== Vocalization ===
The striated antbird's song is "2-parted, first several harsh, buzzing notes followed by an accelerating series of peeping whistles: chewDJZZ-DJAA-DJAA tew-tew-ti-ti-titutututututu". Its call is "a paired series of descending mewing whistles: pew-pew".

== Status ==
The IUCN has assessed the striated antbird as being of Least Concern. It has a very large range; its population size is not known and is believed to be decreasing. No immediate threats have been identified. It is considered rare in Colombia and Ecuador and locally fairly common in Peru. "Human activity has little direct effect on the Striated Antbird, other than the local effects of habitat destruction."

== See also ==
- Drymophila, information on the genus
