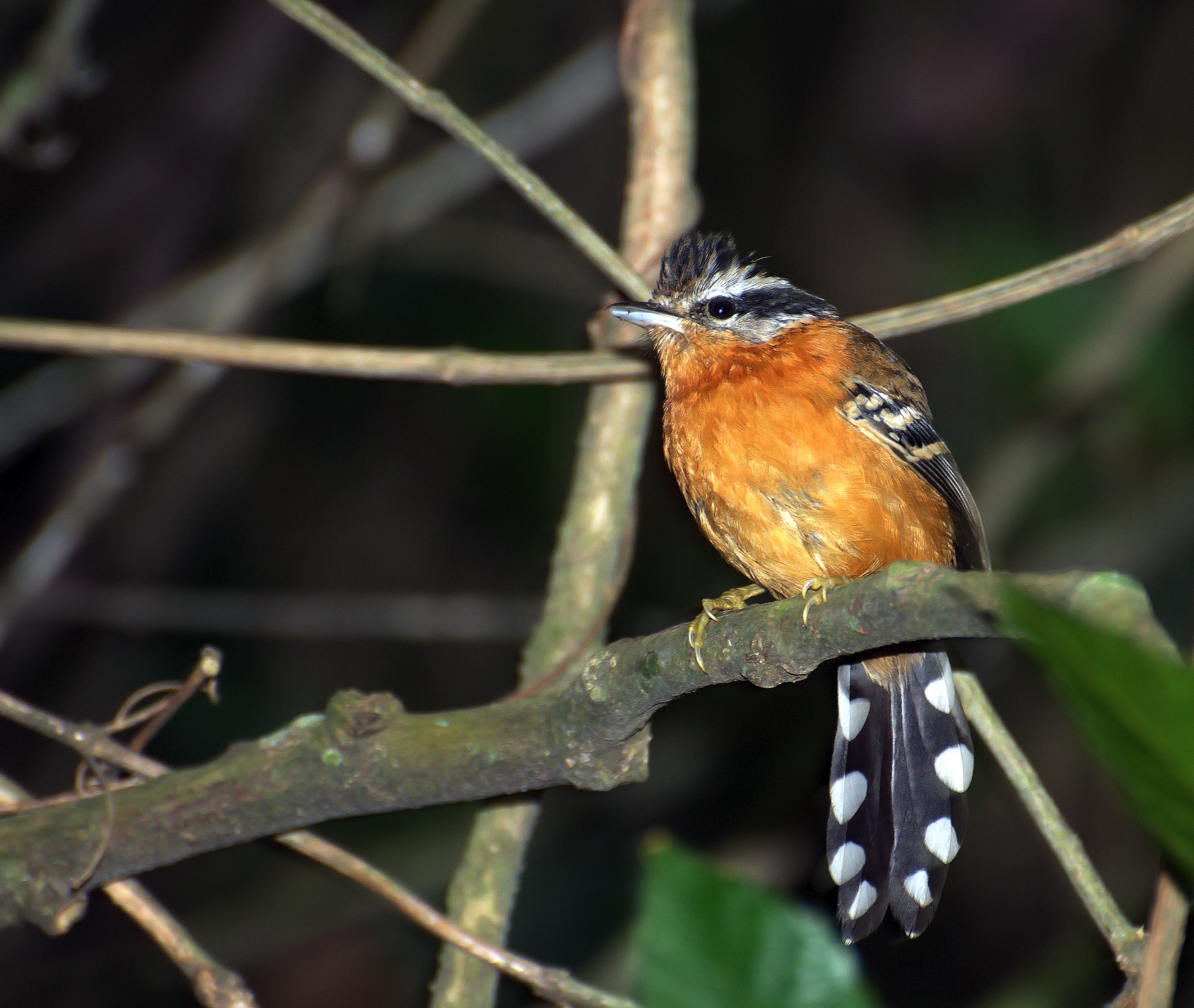
- Female in Serra da Cantareira State Park, São Paulo, Brazil

Conservation status
- Least Concern (IUCN 3.1)

Scientific classification
- Kingdom: Animalia
- Phylum: Chordata
- Class: Aves
- Order: Passeriformes
- Family: Thamnophilidae
- Genus: Drymophila
- Species: D. ferruginea

Binomial name
- Drymophila ferruginea (Temminck, 1822)

= Ferruginous antbird =

Species of bird

The ferruginous antbird (Drymophila ferruginea) is an insectivorous bird in subfamily Thamnophilinae of family Thamnophilidae, the "typical antbirds". It is endemic to Brazil.

== Taxonomy and systematics ==
The ferruginous antbird was described by the Dutch zoologist Coenraad Jacob Temminck in 1822 and given the binomial name Myiothera ferruginea. It is now placed in genus Drymophila which was introduced by the English naturalist William Swainson in 1824. The specific epithet is from the Latin ferrugineus, "rusty-colored".

The ferruginous antbird has no subspecies, but what is now Bertoni's antbird (Drymophila rubricollis) was previously treated as a subspecies of it.

== Description ==
The ferruginous antbird is 12 to 13 cm (4.7 to 5.1 in) long and weighs 9.5 to 11.5 g (0.34 to 0.41 oz). Adult males have a black crown, a white supercilium, a wide black band through the eye, and white cheeks with black speckles. Their upperparts are mostly reddish yellow-brown with a (usually hidden) white patch between the scapulars and a rufous rump. Their wings are brownish black with buffish edges on the flight feathers and wide white tips on the coverts. Their tail is black with wide white tips on the feathers. Their chin is white with black speckles; their throat and underparts are rufous. Females are similar to males but are paler, with olive streaks on the crown, rufous tips on the wing coverts, and no white patch between the scapulars. Subadult males resemble adult females with the interscapular patch, wide buff edges on the crown feathers, a buff-tinged supercilium, and paler underparts.

== Distribution and habitat ==
The ferruginous antbird is found in southeastern Brazil in an area roughly defined by southeastern Bahia, northeastern Santa Catarina, east-central Minas Gerais, and western São Paulo states. It inhabits stands of bamboo, mostly along the edges of primary evergreen forest. It also inhabits bamboo in secondary woodland, in openings made by fallen trees, and in pure stand-alone patches. It mostly occurs from sea level to 1,200 m (3,900 ft) but is occasionally found as high as 1,600 m (5,200 ft).

== Behavior ==
=== Movement ===
The ferruginous antbird is believed to be a year-round resident throughout its range.

=== Feeding ===
The ferruginous antbird feeds mostly on a wide variety of arthropods. It typically forages individually, in pairs, and in family groups, usually within about 10 m (33 ft) of the ground. It often joins mixed-species feeding flocks but is not known to follow army ants. It typically forages at the edges of bamboo patches where the bamboo is tangled with the forest understorey, though also within patches of younger bamboo. It gleans prey from live leaves and stems by reaching, lunging, or making short flights from a perch. It also probes and tears at clusters of dead leaves.

=== Breeding ===
The ferruginous antbird breeds between October and February. The one known nest was a basket made from strands of moss hanging from a fork in a fern leaf only 1 m (3 ft) above the ground. The eggs in it were white with reddish-brown speckles, blotches, and lines. The typical clutch size, incubation period, time to fledging, and details of parental care are not known.

=== Vocalization ===
The ferruginous antbird's song is a "very high, loud, sharp 'tit-tuweéw' (1 x or 3 x without interval)". Its calls include a "rich 'chewp' and [a] short, 'chirring' rattle".

== Status ==
The IUCN has assessed the ferruginous antbird as being of Least Concern. It has a large range; its population size is not known and is believed to be stable. No immediate threats have been identified. It is considered common across its range and occurs in several large protected areas. "Its ability to utilize second-growth habitats may render it less vulnerable to disturbance than are most other antbirds."
