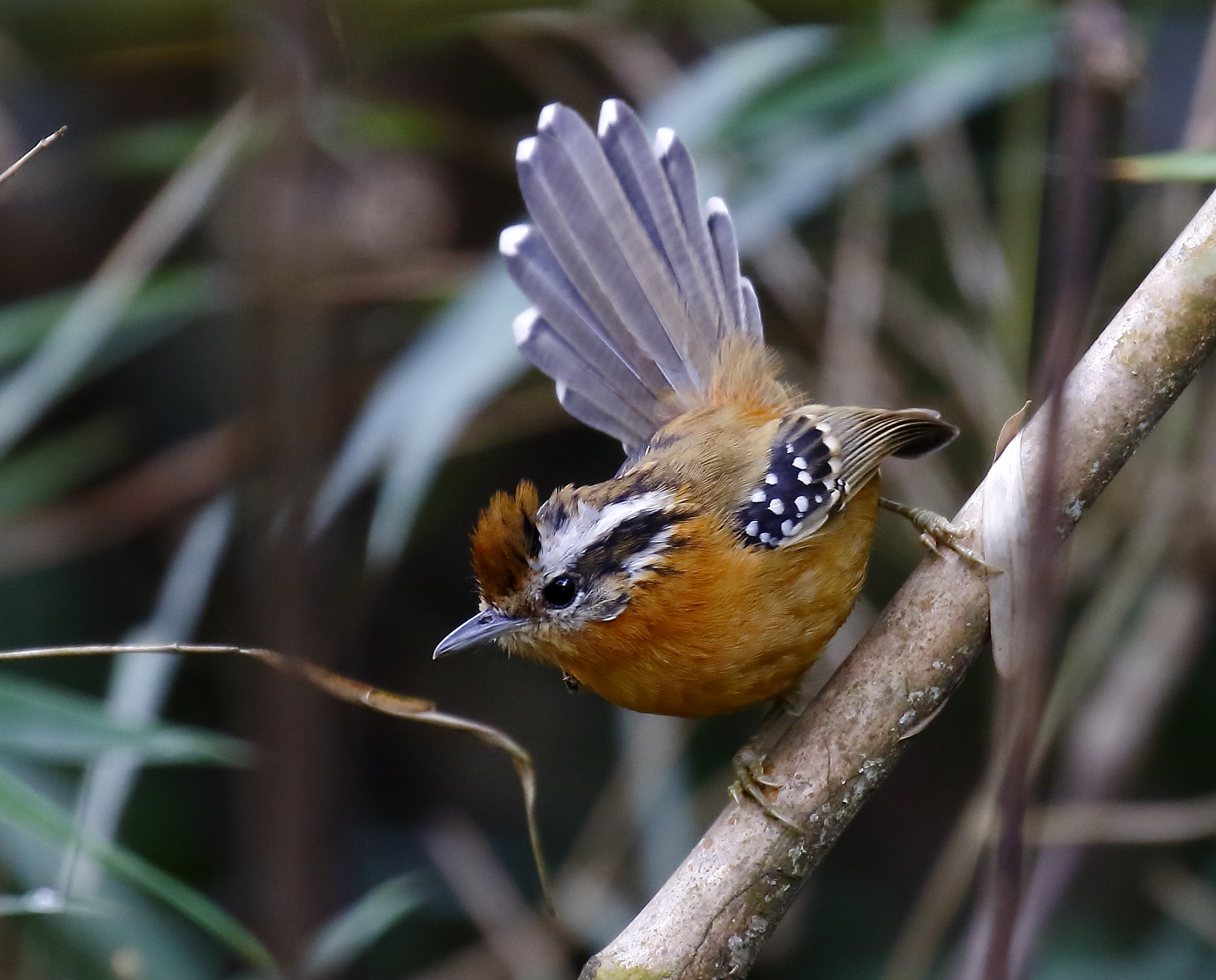
- A female Bertoni's antbird at Salesópolis, São Paulo, Brazil

Conservation status
- Least Concern (IUCN 3.1)

Scientific classification
- Kingdom: Animalia
- Phylum: Chordata
- Class: Aves
- Order: Passeriformes
- Family: Thamnophilidae
- Genus: Drymophila
- Species: D. rubricollis

Binomial name
- Drymophila rubricollis (Bertoni, AW, 1901)

Synonyms
- Drymophila ferruginea rubricollis

= Bertoni's antbird =

Species of bird

Bertoni's antbird (Drymophila rubricollis) is a species of bird in subfamily Thamnophilinae of family Thamnophilidae, the "typical antbirds". It is found in Argentina, Brazil, and Paraguay.

== Taxonomy and systematics ==
What is now Bertoni's antbird was previously considered a subspecies of the ferruginous antbird (D. ferruginea). After the split, it was given its English name to commemorate the ornithologist who described it, Arnoldo de Winkelried Bertoni (1857–1929).

Bertoni's antbird is monotypic.

== Description ==
Bertoni's antbird is 12.5 to 13.5 cm (4.9 to 5.3 in) long; one individual weighed 10 g (0.35 oz). Adult males have a black crown, a white supercilium, a wide black band through the eye, and white cheeks with black speckles. Their upperparts are mostly reddish yellow-brown with few black feathers, a (usually hidden) white patch between the scapulars, and a rufous rump. Their wings are brownish black with paler edges on the flight feathers and wide white tips on black coverts. Their tail is dark brown to blackish brown with wide white tips on the feathers. Their chin is white with black speckles; their throat and underparts are rufous. Females are similar to males but are paler, with rufescent forehead and crown, rufous tips on the wing coverts, and no white patch between the scapulars. Subadult males resemble adult females but have the interscapular patch.

== Distribution and habitat ==
Bertoni's antbird is found from southeastern Minas Gerais and São Paulo states in Brazil south through central and western Paraná into eastern Paraguay and extreme northeastern Argentina's Misiones Province. It inhabits the understorey to mid-storey of bamboo stands in evergreen forest, though it appears to be less dependent on bamboo in the southern part of its range. In the northern part of its range it occurs between 900 and 2,000 m (3,000 and 6,600 ft) of elevation but is found near sea level in the south.

== Behavior ==
=== Movement ===
Bertoni's antbird is believed to be a year-round resident throughout its range, though it may make local movements when bamboo stands die.

=== Feeding ===
Bertoni's antbird feeds mostly on a wide variety of arthropods. It typically forages individually, in pairs, and in family groups, usually within about 15 m (50 ft) of the ground. It often joins mixed-species feeding flocks but is not known to follow army ants. In the north it typically forages within bamboo patches and only occasionally in nearby trees and shrubs. It gleans prey from live leaves and stems by reaching, lunging, or making short flights from a perch. It also probes and tears at clusters of dead leaves.

=== Breeding ===
The breeding season of Bertoni's antbird has not been fully defined but includes November to January. One nest is known; it was a cup of plant material suspended from crossed bamboo stems and almost completely hidden by bamboo leaves. Adults were carrying food to it. The clutch size, incubation period, time to fledging, and other details of parental care are not known.

=== Vocalization ===
The song of Bertoni's antbird is a "series of about 6-10 thin, sharp notes, starting very high, descending steeply, and accelerating to drawn-out last two notes". It has been written as "cheep cheep cheep chip chip chewy chewy". Its calls "include long ...somewhat harsh and complaining notes in short series of 4–6, [and] similar but harsher and longer...notes in triplets".

== Status ==
The IUCN has assessed Bertoni's antbird as being of Least Concern. Its population size is not known and is believed to be stable. No immediate threats have been identified. It is considered fairly common across its range, which includes several large protected areas.
