= Scaled antbird =

Conservation status
- Least Concern (IUCN 3.1)

Scientific classification
- Kingdom: Animalia
- Phylum: Chordata
- Class: Aves
- Order: Passeriformes
- Family: Thamnophilidae
- Genus: Drymophila
- Species: D. squamata

Binomial name
- Drymophila squamata (Lichtenstein, MHC, 1823)

Species of bird in Brazil

The scaled antbird (Drymophila squamata) is a species of bird in subfamily Thamnophilinae of family Thamnophilidae, the "typical antbirds". It is endemic to Brazil.

== Taxonomy and systematics ==
The scaled antbird has two subspecies, the nominate D. s. squamata (Lichtenstein, MHC, 1823) and D. s. stictocorypha (Boucard & Berlepsch, 1892). Results of genetic testing hint that D. s. stictocorypha may be a separate species but data about possible differences in the vocalizations and ecology of the two taxa are scarce.

== Description ==
The scaled antbird is 12 to 14 cm (4.7 to 5.5 in) long and weighs 10.5 to 11 g (0.37 to 0.39 oz). Adult males of the nominate subspecies have a black crown with white spots along its side, a wide white supercilium, and a black stripe through the eye on an otherwise black-spotted white face. Their upperparts are black with white spots. Their wings are black and their wing coverts black with wide white tips. Their tail is barred with black and white. Their throat and underparts are white with black spots. Females have the same pattern but different colors than males. Their crown and eye stripe are dark brown. Their upperparts are dark brown with buff spots, their wing coverts are dark brown with buff tips, and their tail is barred with dark brown and buff. Their flanks and crissum are pale cinnamon. Males of subspecies D. s. stictocorypha are similar to the nominate but with white spots in the center of their crown and a darker gray belly. There appears to be some overlap between the two subspecies.

== Distribution and habitat ==
The scaled antbird is found in eastern and southeastern Brazil The nominate subspecies occurs in the eastern parts of the states of Pernambuco, Alagoas, and Bahia. Subspecies D. s. stictocorypha occurs further south, from eastern Minas Gerais and Espírito Santo south into extreme northeastern Santa Catarina. The species inhabits the dense understorey of evergreen forest and secondary woodland. In some areas it often occurs in bamboo thickets but just as often away from them, and it is the only member of its genus that is not closely tied to bamboo. In elevation it ranges from sea level to 1,100 m (3,600 ft); it tends to be at higher elevations in the northern part of its range.

== Behavior ==
=== Movement ===
The scaled antbird is believed to be a year-round resident throughout its range.

=== Feeding ===
The scaled antbird feeds mostly on a variety of arthropods. It typically forages individually, in pairs, and in family groups, usually within about 4 m (15 ft) of the ground though sometimes as high as 6 m (20 ft). It sometimes joins mixed-species feeding flocks that pass through its territory, and the nominate occasionally follows army ant swarms. It forages in dense vegetation, hitching itself up trunks and vines and flicking its wings. It also forages while moving through downed branches, leaf litter, and other debris on the ground. It gleans prey primarily by reaching or lunging from a perch, feeding mostly from live vegetation. It also takes prey with short flights to the substrate.

=== Breeding ===
The scaled antbird's breeding season has not been fully defined but appears to span at least October to December. The known nests were somewhat variable, a basket or cup of leaves, other plant fibers, moss, and roots. They were suspended between two branches or in a fork; all were less than 2 m (7 ft) above the ground. One clutch had two eggs. Both parents provisioned nestlings and the female alone brooded them at night. The incubation period, time to fledging, and other details of parental care are not known.

=== Vocalization ===
The scaled antbird's song is an "[e]xtr. high, calm series of 4-7 sharp, pushed-out, descending notes". Its calls include an "abrupt 'pip " that may be repeated two to four times and a high-pitched short rattle that decreases in pitch and volume.

== Status ==
The IUCN has assessed the scaled antbird as being of Least Concern. Its population size is not known and is believed to be stable. No immediate threats have been identified. It is considered fairly common to common across its range and occurs in several protected areas.
