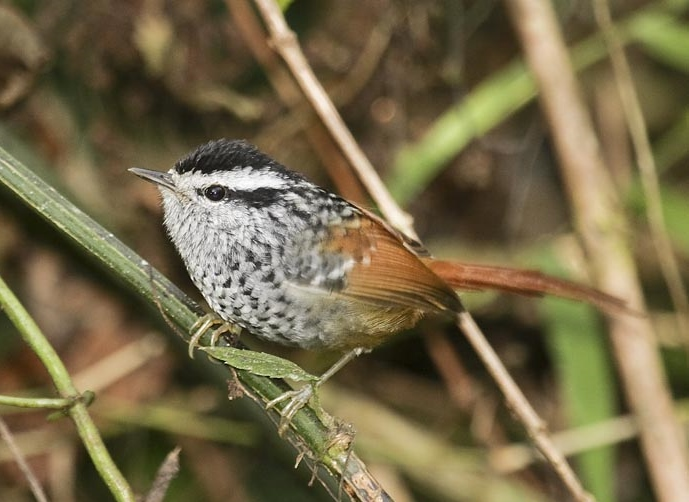

Conservation status
- Least Concern (IUCN 3.1)

Scientific classification
- Kingdom: Animalia
- Phylum: Chordata
- Class: Aves
- Order: Passeriformes
- Family: Thamnophilidae
- Genus: Drymophila
- Species: D. genei

Binomial name
- Drymophila genei (De Filippi, 1847)

= Rufous-tailed antbird =

Species of bird

The rufous-tailed antbird (Drymophila genei) is a species of bird in subfamily Thamnophilinae of family Thamnophilidae, the "typical antbirds". It is endemic to Brazil.

== Taxonomy and systematics ==
The rufous-tailed antbird and the ochre-rumped antbird (D. ochropyga) are sister species. Both are monotypic.

== Description ==
The rufous-tailed antbird is 13 to 14 cm (5.1 to 5.5 in) long. Adult males have a black crown, a white supercilium, a black band through the eye, and white cheeks with black speckles. Their back is olive-brown with black spots and a white patch between the scapulars. Their rump and tail are rufous. Their flight feathers are rufous and wing coverts black with white tips. Their throat and breast are white with black spots that are larger on the latter. Their flanks and crissum are plain rufous-brown. Females have a rufous-brown crown and nape with blackish streaks. They have a whitish supercilium, a dark brown line through the eye, and buff cheeks. Their upperparts, wings, and tail are similar to the male's but without black spots and the interscapular patch. Their throat and underparts are buff with some faint dark marks on the throat and breast.

== Distribution and habitat ==
The rufous-tailed antbird has a disjunct distribution in southeastern Brazil, in southeastern Minas Gerais, southern Espírito Santo, northeastern São Paulo and Rio de Janeiro. It primarily inhabits bamboo stands in montane evergreen forest though it also occurs in adjoining viny plots and other dense foliage. In elevation it mostly occurs between 1,150 and 2,200 m (3,800 and 7,200 ft) though it is found as low as 800 m (2,600 ft).

== Behavior ==
=== Movement ===
The rufous-tailed antbird is believed to be a year-round resident throughout its range, though it may make local movements when bamboo stands die.

=== Feeding ===
The rufous-tailed antbird feeds mostly on a wide variety of arthropods. It typically forages individually, in pairs, and in family groups, usually within about 3 m (10 ft) of the ground and rarely as high as 7 m (25 ft). It sometimes joins mixed-species feeding flocks that pass through its territory and rarely follows army ant swarms. It gleans prey from leaves both live and dead, vines, and stems by reaching and lunging from a perch.

=== Breeding ===
Nothing is known about the rufous-tailed antbird's breeding biology.

=== Vocalization ===
The rufous-tailed antbird's song is a "series of 6-7 notes, starting with very high 'sih', then jumping to lower nasal 'theèh' notes, the total as 'síhtjeè-tjeèh-tjeèh' ". Its calls "include flat, thin, somewhat high-pitched, short...notes in groups of 3–6 and similar groups of longer..raspy 'chirrs', closely spaced".

== Status ==
The IUCN originally in 1988 assessed the rufous-tailed antbird as Near Threatened, then in 1994 as Unknown, in 2004 again as Near Threatened, and since 2013 as of Least Concern. Though its overall range is large it is found discontinuously within it. Its estimated population of between 6000 and 58,000 mature individuals is believed to be decreasing. It is threatened by conversion of its habitat to ranching and agriculture and by fire. It is considered locally common within protected areas but has a "tiny range and specialized habitat requirements".
