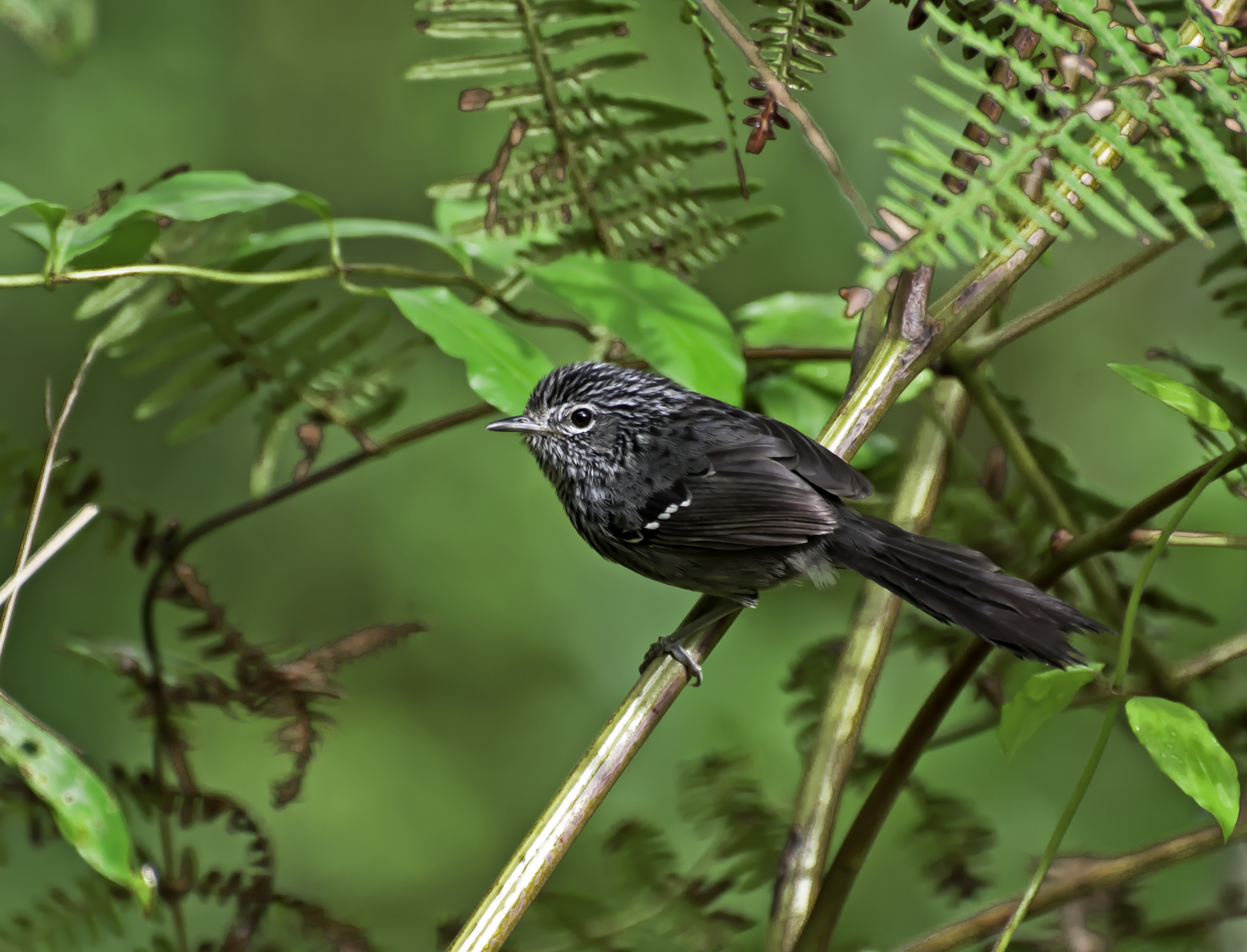
- Male, Reserva Guainumbi, São Luis do Paraitinga, São Paulo, Brazil Song recorded in Uraguayi Forest Reserve, Argentina

Conservation status
- Least Concern (IUCN 3.1)

Scientific classification
- Kingdom: Animalia
- Phylum: Chordata
- Class: Aves
- Order: Passeriformes
- Family: Thamnophilidae
- Genus: Drymophila
- Species: D. malura

Binomial name
- Drymophila malura (Temminck, 1825)

= Dusky-tailed antbird =

Species of bird

The dusky-tailed antbird (Drymophila malura) is an insectivorous bird in subfamily Thamnophilinae of family Thamnophilidae, the "typical antbirds". It is found in Argentina, Brazil, and Paraguay.

== Taxonomy and systematics ==
The dusky-tailed antbird was described by the Dutch zoologist Coenraad Jacob Temminck in 1825 and given the binomial name Myiothera malura. The specific epithet malura is from the Ancient Greek malos "soft" or "weak". It is now placed in the genus Drymophila which was introduced by the English naturalist William Swainson in 1824.

The dusky-tailed antbird is monotypic.

== Description ==
The dusky-tailed antbird is 13 to 14.5 cm (5.1 to 5.7 in) long and weighs 11 to 13 g (0.39 to 0.46 oz). Adult males' head and neck are streaked with black and whitish gray. Their upperparts are gray with a white patch between the scapulars; the white feathers have black tips. Their flight feathers are brownish and their wing coverts blackish with white tips. Their tail is brownish gray. Their throat and breast are streaked black and white and their flanks and crissum are olive-brown. Females' crown, nape, and sides of the neck have heavy dark brown and buff to olive-brown streaks. They have pale buff crescents above and below their eye and most of the rest of their face has fine dark streaks. Their upperparts and tail are mostly warm brown with a blackish gray patch between the scapulars. Their flight feathers are warm brown with rufous edges and their wing coverts are blackish with narrow white or pale buff tips. Their underparts are mostly buff that is nearly white on the throat and center of the breast. Their breast has dark brown streaks that are heaviest on the sides. Their lower flanks and vent area are rich ochraceous.

== Distribution and habitat ==
The dusky-tailed antbird is found from the southeastern Brazilian states of Minas Gerais and Rio de Janeiro south into northern Rio Grande do Sul, through southeastern Paraguay, and into northeastern Argentina's Misiones Province. It inhabits the interior and edges of evergreen forest and also secondary woodland. In all areas it favors a dense understorey of ferns, vines, or bamboo, though at forest edges the understorey often includes tall grass. In most parts of its range it occurs below 1,300 m (4,300 ft) but locally is found as high as 1,900 m (6,200 ft).

== Behavior ==
=== Movement ===
The dusky-tailed antbird is believed to be a year-round resident throughout its range.

=== Feeding ===
The dusky-tailed antbird feeds mostly on a variety of arthropods. It typically forages individually, in pairs, and in family groups, usually within about 4 m (15 ft) of the ground though sometimes as high as 8 m (25 ft). It sometimes joins mixed-species feeding flocks that pass through its territory and is not known to follow army ant swarms. It forages in dense vegetation, actively hopping through it and flicking its tail. It gleans prey primarily from leaves living and dead, bamboo stems, and vines, mostly by reaching from a perch. It also takes prey with jumps and short flights to the substrate.

=== Breeding ===
The dusky-tailed antbird's breeding season is not known but is believed to include September. What is thought to be one of its nests was an open cup woven of bamboo leaves, moss, seed stems, and spider silk suspended between two bamboo stems. The species' clutch size, incubation period, time to fledging, and details of parental care are not known.

=== Vocalization ===
The dusky-tailed antbird's song is a "very high series starting with 'tsip tsip', then accelerating and slightly descending to a rattling trill." Its calls include "short...thin, buzzy (modulated), somewhat high-pitched notes, repeated after short intervals, and [a] harsher note with [a] clearer ending".

== Status ==
The IUCN has assessed the dusky-tailed antbird as being of Least Concern. Its population size is not known and is believed to be stable. No immediate threats have been identified. It is considered locally fairly common but patchily distributed. It occurs in several protected areas. It has "less specialized habitat requirements than congeners, which should render it less vulnerable to disturbance; [it] appears able to survive in large patches of more or less remnant forest".
