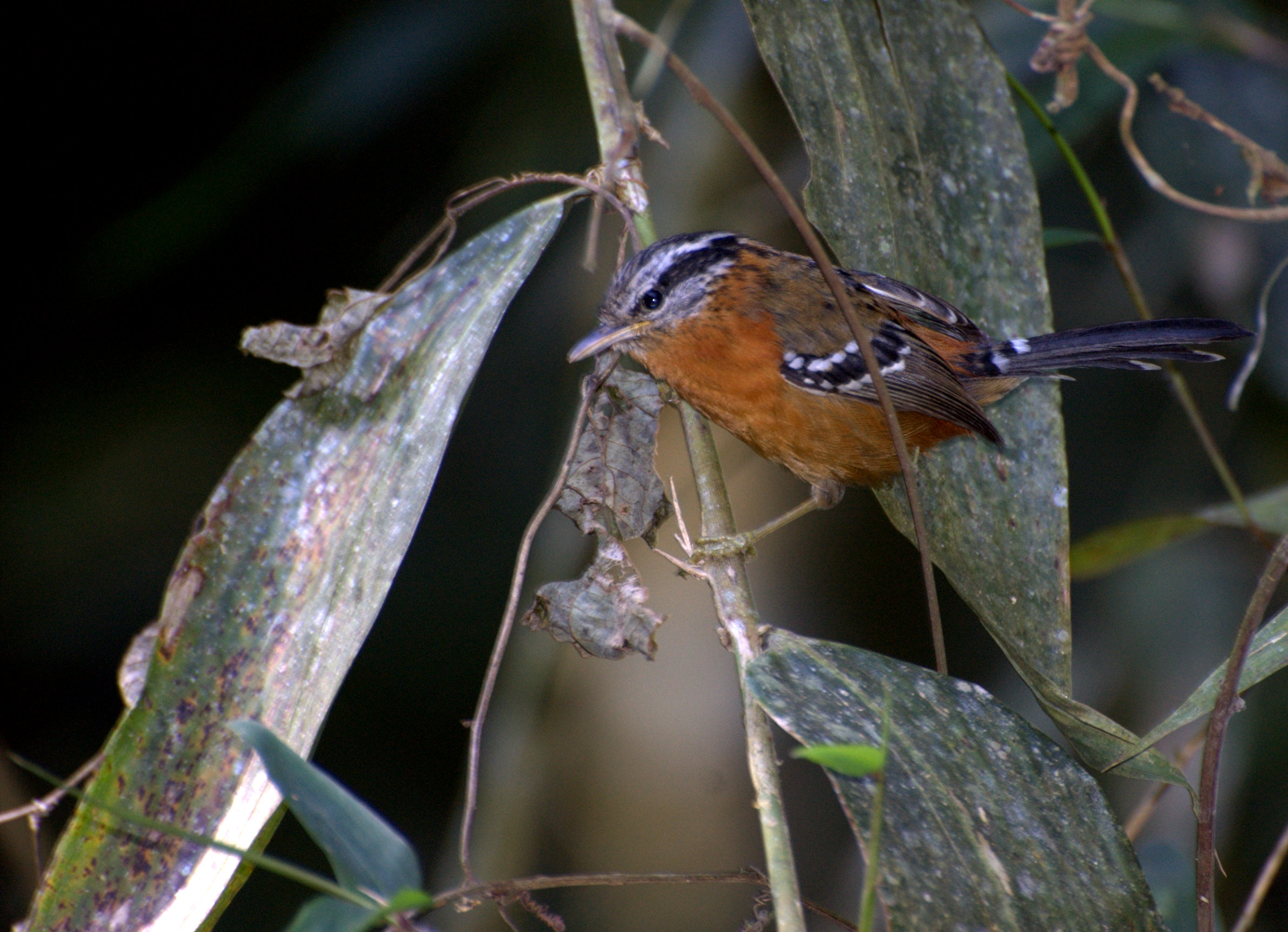
- Ferruginous antbird (Drymophila ferruginea)

Scientific classification
- Kingdom: Animalia
- Phylum: Chordata
- Class: Aves
- Order: Passeriformes
- Family: Thamnophilidae
- Tribe: Pithyini
- Genus: Drymophila; Swainson, 1824

Type species
- Drymophila variegata Such, 1824

Species
- See text

= Drymophila =

Genus of birds

Drymophila is a genus of passerine birds in the antbird family Thamnophilidae that are found in South America.

== Taxonomy ==
The genus Drymophila was introduced by the English naturalist William Swainson in 1824. The Drymophila antbird is a species of bird in the Thamnophilidae family, known for thriving in a bamboo-rich environment such as South America by utilizing aspects of the bamboo to allow for a food source, shelter, and protection from predators The type species is the ferruginous antbird. The name of the genus combines the Ancient Greek words drumos for "wood" or "copse" and philos "fond of".

A molecular phylogenetic study published in 2020 found that the genus Drymophila was not monophyletic. The scaled antbird (Drymophila squamata) was sister to a clade containing the remaining species in the genus Drymophila and the warbling-antbirds in the genus Hypocnemis.

== Species ==
The genus Drymophila contains the following eleven species:

| Image | Scientific name | Common name | Distribution |
|---|---|---|---|
| | Ferruginous antbird | Drymophila ferruginea | Atlantic Forest |
| | Bertoni's antbird | Drymophila rubricollis | southern Atlantic Forest |
| | Rufous-tailed antbird | Drymophila genei | mid Atlantic Forest |
| | Ochre-rumped antbird | Drymophila ochropyga | Atlantic Forest |
| | Dusky-tailed antbird | Drymophila malura | Atlantic Forest |
| | Scaled antbird | Drymophila squamata | Atlantic Forest |
| | Striated antbird | Drymophila devillei | southern Amazonia; eastern foothills of Colombia and Ecuador |
| | Santa Marta antbird | Drymophila hellmayri | Sierra Nevada de Santa Marta |
| | Klages's antbird | Drymophila klagesi | Serranía del Perijá, Cordillera de Mérida and Venezuelan Coastal Range |
| | East Andean antbird | Drymophila caudata | western slope of Cordillera Oriental (Colombia) & upper Magdalena valley |
| | Streak-headed antbird | Drymophila striaticeps | Northern Andes |

=== Former species ===
Formerly, some authorities also considered the following species (or subspecies) as species within the genus Drymophila:

- Spectacled monarch (as Drymophila trivirgata)
- Island monarch (as Drymophila cinerascens)
- Shining flycatcher (as Drymophila alecto)

== Distribution ==
Six of the Drymophila species are associated with regions of southeastern Brazil; two of these - Bertoni's and dusky-tailed antbird - also range into eastern Paraguay and extreme northeastern Argentina.

Even at their highest diversity in Brazil's Mata Atlântica, the species are almost completely parapatric, in some cases like the dusky-tailed and scaled antbird even to exclusive habitat preferences. Of course, the rampant deforestation in that region may obscure that there has been more overlap in the past. In any case, habitat fragments strongly tend to hold at most a single species.

D. devillei, the striated antbird, is a species of the southwestern quadrant of the Amazon Basin, and a disjunct population lives in north-western Ecuador and adjacent parts of Colombia.
