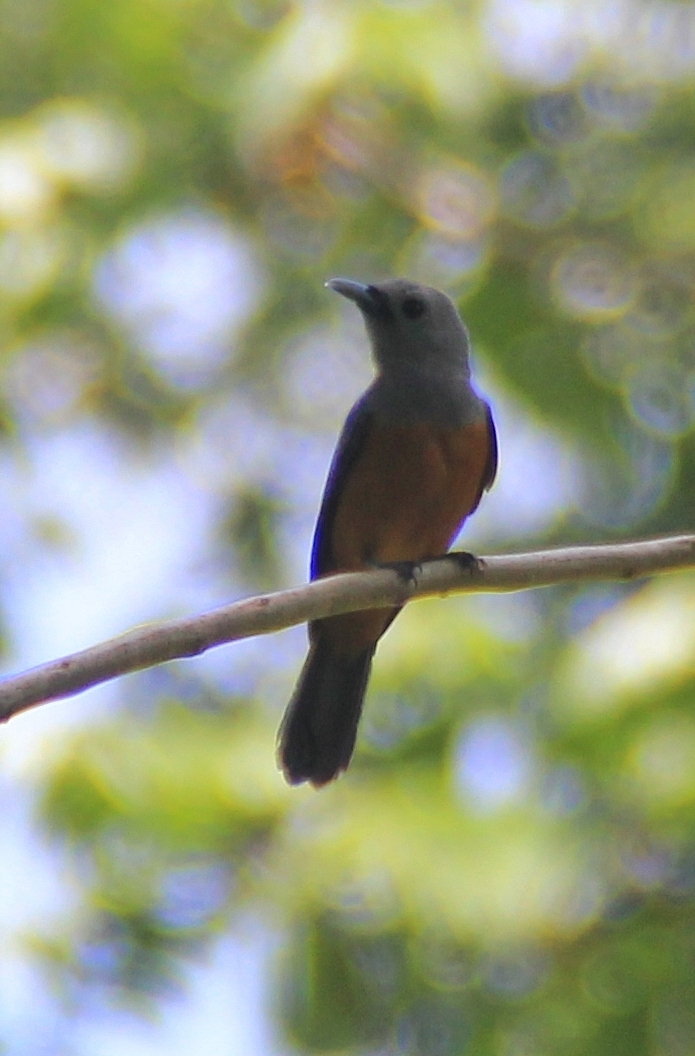
- at Talaud Islands

Conservation status
- Least Concern (IUCN 3.1)

Scientific classification
- Kingdom: Animalia
- Phylum: Chordata
- Class: Aves
- Order: Passeriformes
- Family: Monarchidae
- Genus: Monarcha
- Species: M. cinerascens

Binomial name
- Monarcha cinerascens (Temminck, 1827)

Subspecies
- See text

Synonyms
- Drymophila cinerascens

= Island monarch =

Species of bird

The island monarch (Monarcha cinerascens) is a species of bird in the family Monarchidae. It is found from Sulawesi to the Solomon Islands. Its natural habitats are subtropical or tropical moist lowland forests and subtropical or tropical moist montane forests.

== Taxonomy and systematics ==
The island monarch was originally described in the genus Drymophila. Alternate names include the grey-headed monarch, island grey-headed monarch, island grey-headed monarch flycatcher and islet monarch.

=== Subspecies ===
Ten subspecies are recognized:

- M. c. commutatus - Brüggemann, 1876: Originally described as a separate species. Found on Sangir, Siau, Mayu and Tifore Islands (off north-eastern Sulawesi)
- M. c. cinerascens - (Temminck, 1827): Found on Sulawesi, Talaud Archipelago, Moluccas and Lesser Sundas
- M. c. inornatus - (Lesson, R & Garnot, 1828): Originally described as a separate species in the genus Muscicapa. Found on western Papuan islands, north-western New Guinea and Aru Islands
- M. c. steini - Stresemann & Paludan, 1932: Found on Numfor (off north-western New Guinea)
- M. c. geelvinkianus - Meyer, AB, 1884: Originally described as a separate species. Found on Yapen and Biak (off north-western New Guinea)
- M. c. fuscescens - Meyer, AB, 1884: Originally described as a separate species. Found on islands off north-western New Guinea
- M. c. fulviventris - Hartlaub, 1868: Originally described as a separate species. Found in western Bismarck Archipelago
- M. c. perpallidus - Neumann, 1924: Found in northern and central Bismarck Archipelago
- M. c. impediens - Hartert, 1926: Found north-eastern New Guinea & nearby islands, and islets off eastern Bismarck Archipelago to the Solomon Islands
- M. c. rosselianus - Rothschild & Hartert, 1916: Found on Trobriand Islands, D'Entrecasteaux Archipelago and Louisiade Archipelago

The former subspecies nigrirostris from northeastern New Guinea was lumped with impidiens in 2022.
