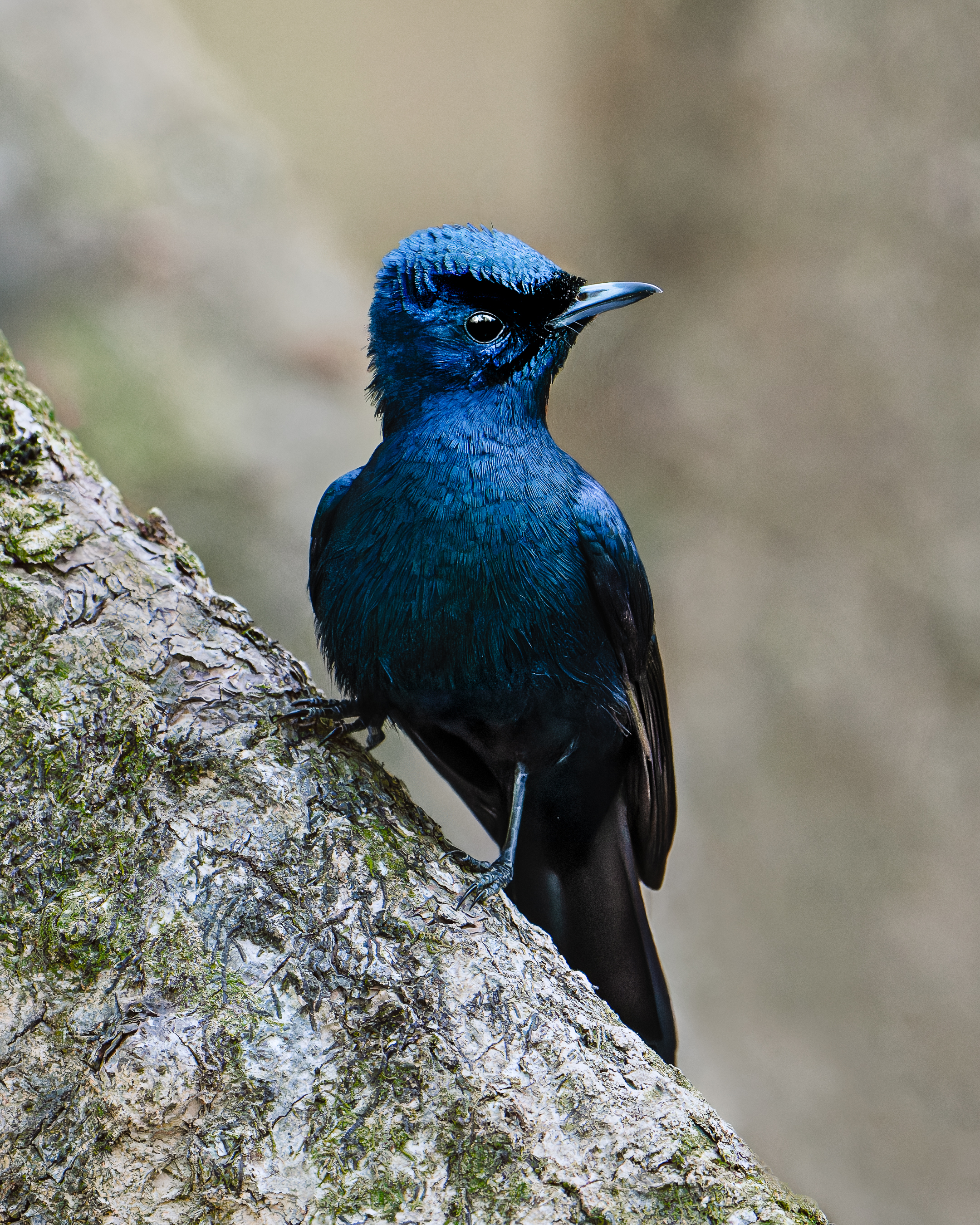
- Male M. a. wardelli
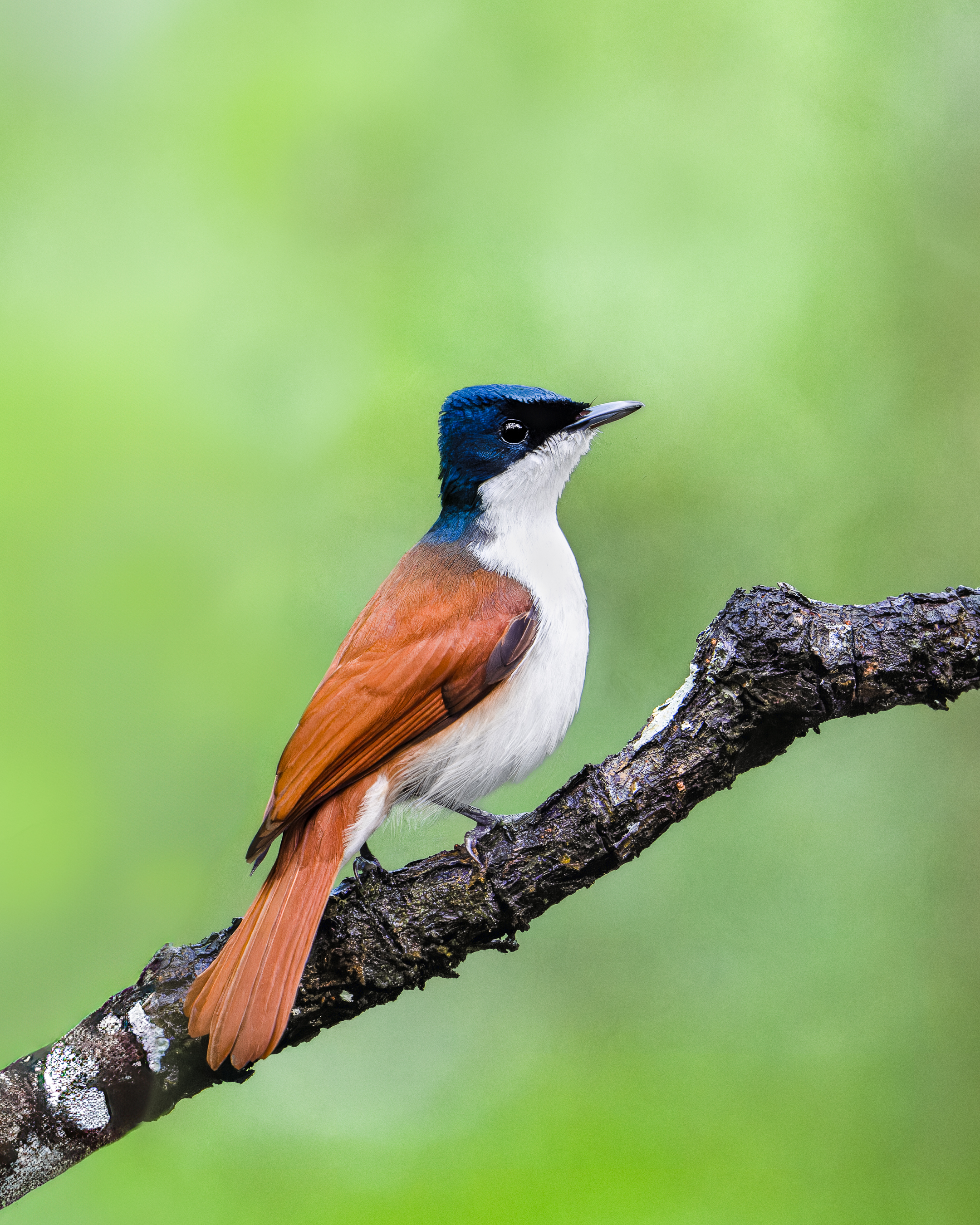
- Female

Conservation status
- Least Concern (IUCN 3.1)

Scientific classification
- Kingdom: Animalia
- Phylum: Chordata
- Class: Aves
- Order: Passeriformes
- Family: Monarchidae
- Genus: Myiagra
- Species: M. alecto

Binomial name
- Myiagra alecto (Temminck, 1827)

Subspecies
- See text

Synonyms
- Drymophila alecto; Monarcha alecto; Piezorhynchus alecto; Piezorhynchus nitidus

= Shining flycatcher =

Species of bird

The shining flycatcher (Myiagra alecto) is a species of bird in the family Monarchidae. It is found in northern Australia, and from the Moluccas to the Bismarck Archipelago. Its natural habitats are subtropical or tropical moist lowland forest and subtropical or tropical mangrove forest.

== Description ==
A long-tailed, slender songbird with fine bill. Male entirely glossy blue-black. Female a rich chestnut above, white below, with black crown and face (in poor light, may appear dark above; compare Restless and Paperbark flycatchers). Song a clear whistled "towhit-too-towhit."

== Taxonomy and systematics ==
The shining flycatcher was originally described in the genus Drymophila and subsequently placed by some authorities in the genus Monarcha. Alternate names include common shining flycatcher, shining monarch, shining monarch flycatcher, shining Myiagra and shining Myiagra-flycatcher.

=== Subspecies ===
Eight subspecies are recognized:

- M. a. alecto - (Temminck, 1827): Found in northern and central Moluccas
- M. a. longirostris - (Mathews, 1928): Found on Tanimbar Islands
- M. a. rufolateralis - (Gray, GR, 1858): Originally described as a separate species. Found on the Aru Islands (south-west of New Guinea)
- M. a. chalybeocephala - (Lesson, R & Garnot, 1828): Originally described as a separate species in the genus Muscicapa. Found on the western Papuan islands, New Guinea and the Bismarck Archipelago
- M. a. lucida - Gray, GR, 1858: Originally described as a separate species. Found on the eastern Papuan islands, D'Entrecasteaux Islands and Louisiade Archipelago
- M. a. manumudari - (Rothschild & Hartert, 1915): Found on Manam (off north-eastern New Guinea)
- M. a. melvillensis - (Mathews, 1912): Found in north-western and north-central Australia
- M. a. wardelli - (Mathews, 1911): Found in southern New Guinea, north-eastern and eastern Australia

== Gallery ==
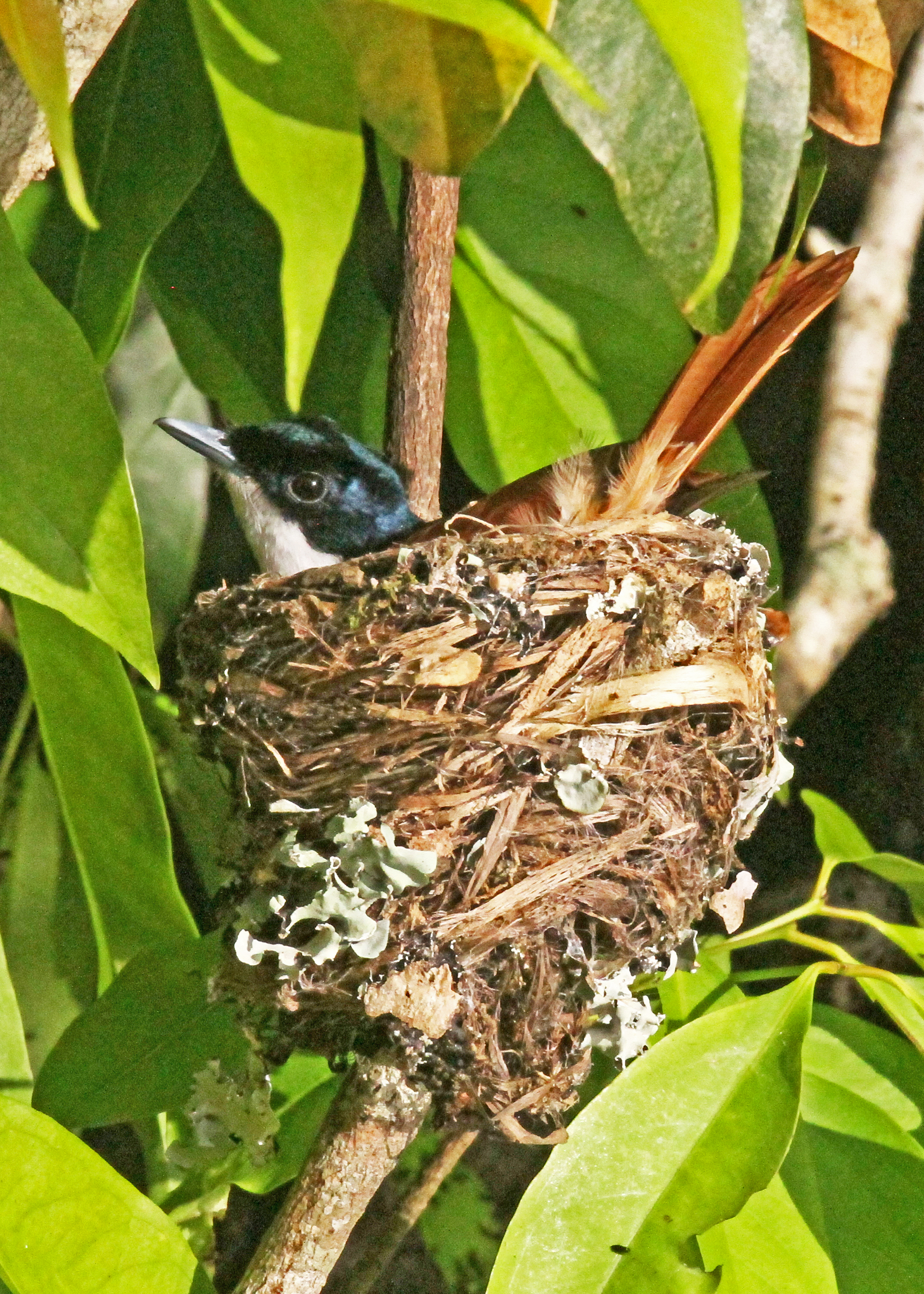
M. a. wardelli, female and nest on the Daintree River, Queensland

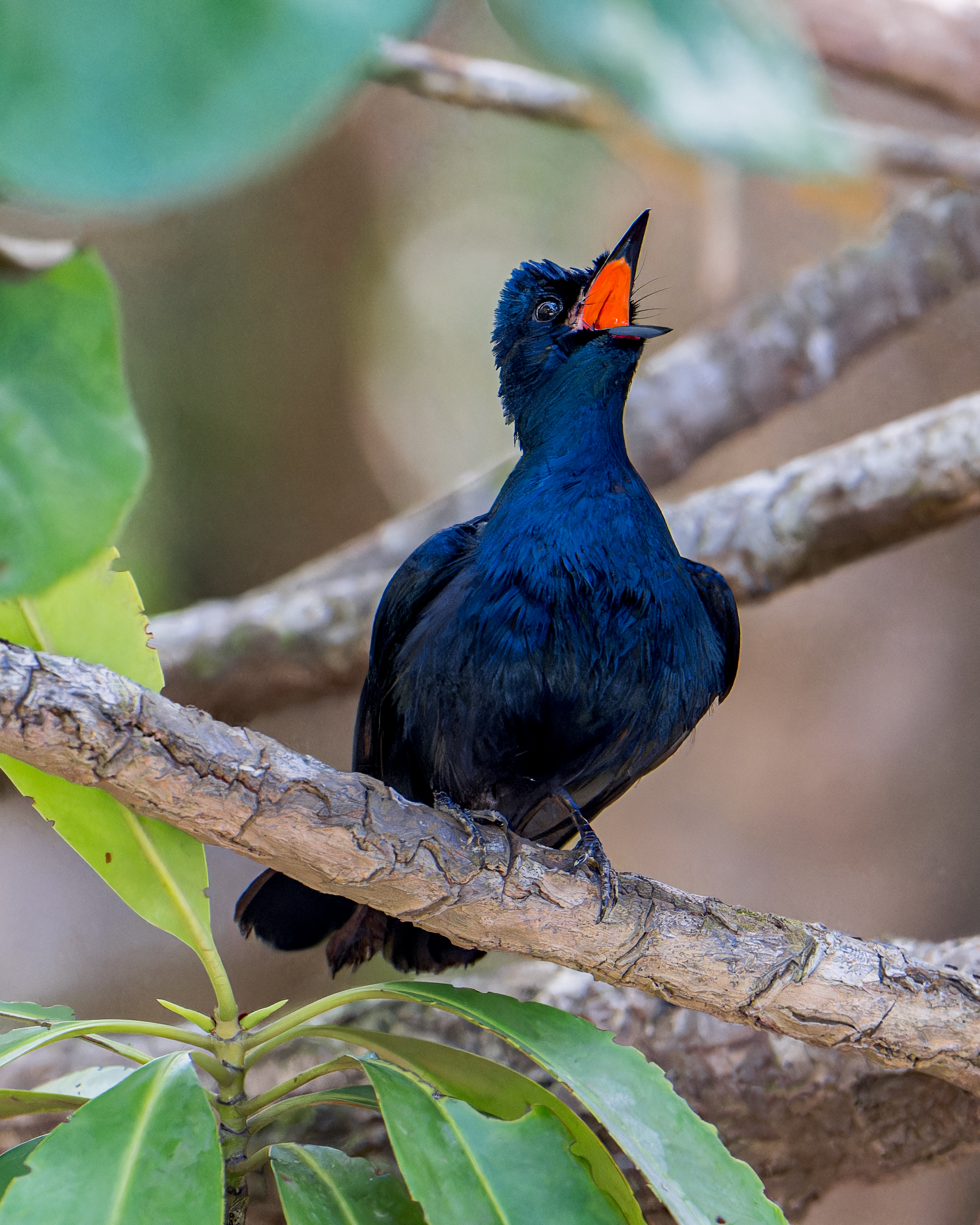
M. a. wardelli, male, showing orange throat, Daintree River

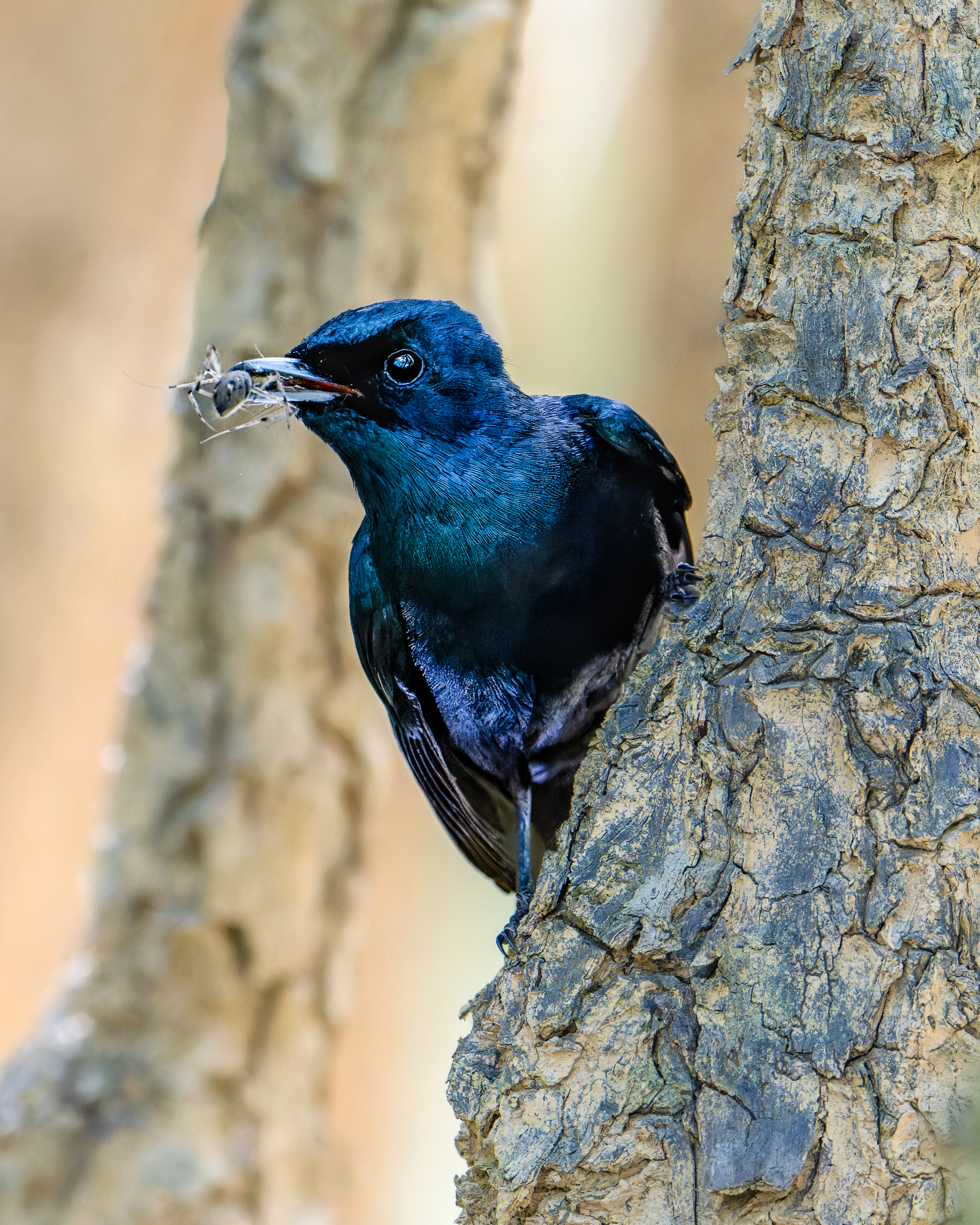
Male in mangroves with spider prey, Daintree River
