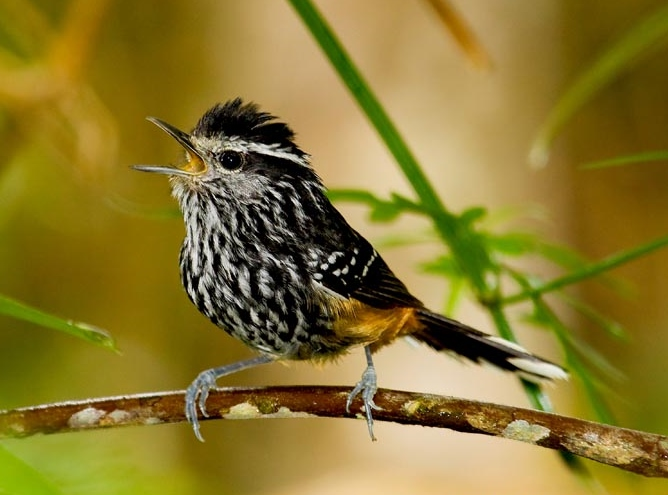

Conservation status
- Least Concern (IUCN 3.1)

Scientific classification
- Kingdom: Animalia
- Phylum: Chordata
- Class: Aves
- Order: Passeriformes
- Family: Thamnophilidae
- Genus: Drymophila
- Species: D. ochropyga

Binomial name
- Drymophila ochropyga (Hellmayr, 1906)

= Ochre-rumped antbird =

Species of bird in Brazil

The ochre-rumped antbird (Drymophila ochropyga) is a species of bird in subfamily Thamnophilinae of family Thamnophilidae, the "typical antbirds". It is endemic to Brazil.

== Taxonomy and systematics ==
The ochre-rumped antbird and the rufous-tailed antbird (D. genei) are sister species. Both are monotypic.

== Description ==
The ochre-rumped antbird is 12.5 to 13.5 cm (4.9 to 5.3 in) long. Adult males have a black crown, a long white supercilium, a black band through the eye, and white cheeks with black speckles. Their back is gray with a few black and white feathers and a white patch between the scapulars. Their rump is light rufous. Their wings are blackish with narrow buff edges on the flight feathers and wide white tips on the coverts. Their throat and breast are white with black streaks that are heavier on the latter. Their flanks and crissum are plain rufous. Females have a buff-streaked crown, an olive-gray back, and duller buffier underparts that are less heavily streaked than the male's.

== Distribution and habitat ==
The ochre-rumped antbird is a bird of the Atlantic Forest Mountains EBA in southeastern Brazil. It is found from central and southeastern Bahia south through eastern Minas Gerais and Espírito Santo to eastern São Paulo, eastern Paraná, and eastern Santa Catarina. It primarily inhabits the understorey of bamboo and vine thickets in montane evergreen forest but also occurs locally in lowland evergreen forest. In elevation it ranges between 300 and 1,950 m (1,000 and 6,400 ft).

== Behavior ==
=== Movement ===
The ochre-rumped antbird is believed to be a year-round resident throughout its range, though it may make local movements when bamboo stands die.

=== Feeding ===
The ochre-rumped antbird feeds mostly on a wide variety of arthropods. It typically forages individually, in pairs, and in family groups, usually within about 3 m (10 ft) of the ground and only rarely higher. It sometimes joins mixed-species feeding flocks that pass through its territory and is not known to follow army ant swarms. It forages in bamboo stands and nearby vine tangles, actively hopping through them and flicking its tail. It gleans prey primarily from dead leaves, mostly by reaching and sometimes lunging from a perch.

=== Breeding ===
The ochre-rumped antbird's eggs are white with irregular reddish brown speckles, blotches, and lines. Nothing else is known about its breeding biology.

=== Vocalization ===
The ochre-rumped antbird's song is a "2-note 'tí-zzzzèh', 1st note very high and sharp, 2nd drawn-out and hoarse". Its most common call is "a series of 3–5 evenly paced, piercing, sharp notes".

== Status ==
The IUCN originally in 1988 assessed the ochre-rumped antbird as Near Threatened, then in 1994 as Unknown, in 2004 again as Near Threatened, and since 2023 as of Least Concern. Its population size is not known and is believed to be decreasing. "Current key threats are urbanisation, industrialisation, agricultural expansion, colonisation and associated road-building." It is considered locally fairly common and occurs in several protected areas. It has specialized habitat requirements, and "[e]pisodic large-scale die-offs of bamboo may result in periodic fluctuations in local populations of this and other bamboo specialists".
