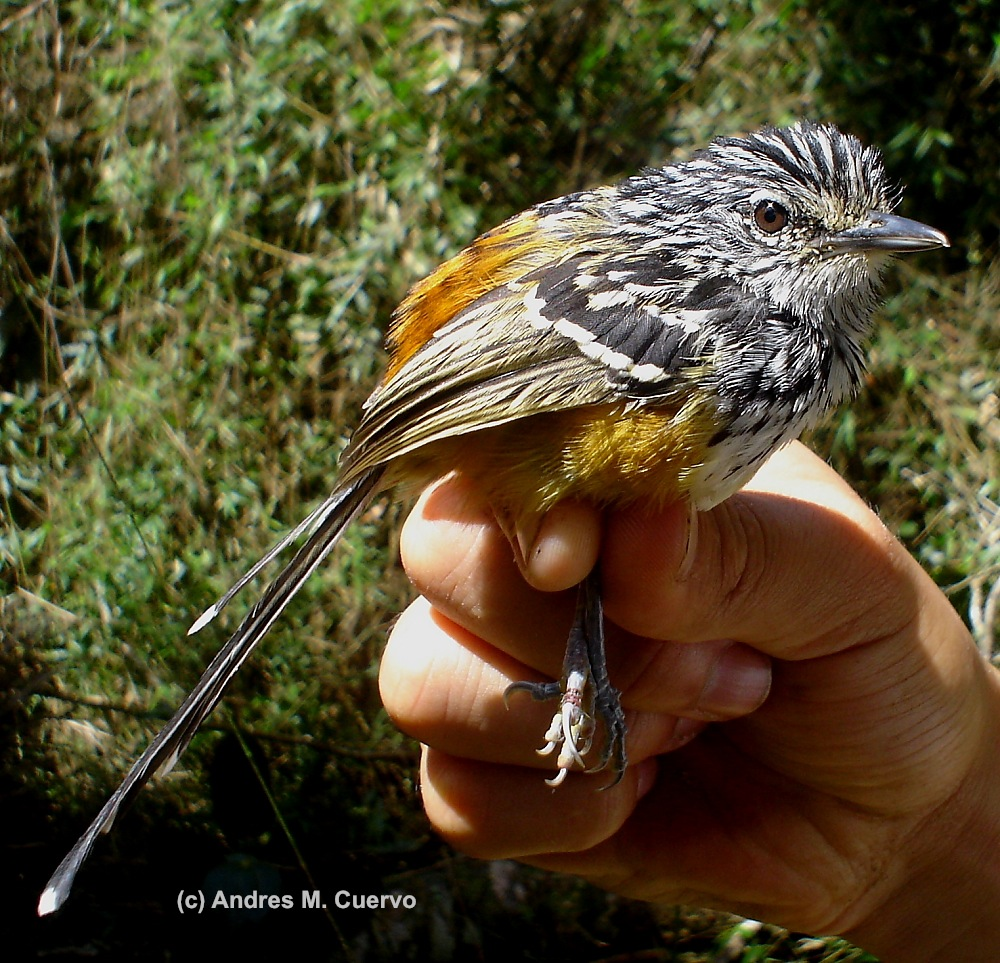

Conservation status
- Least Concern (IUCN 3.1)

Scientific classification
- Kingdom: Animalia
- Phylum: Chordata
- Class: Aves
- Order: Passeriformes
- Family: Thamnophilidae
- Genus: Drymophila
- Species: D. striaticeps

Binomial name
- Drymophila striaticeps Chapman, 1912

= Streak-headed antbird =

Steak-headed antbird

Species of bird

The streak-headed antbird (Drymophila striaticeps) is a species of bird in subfamily Thamnophilinae of family Thamnophilidae, the "typical antbirds". It is found in Bolivia, Colombia, Ecuador, and Peru.

== Taxonomy and systematics ==
The streak-headed antbird and two other antbird species were previously considered subspecies of what was then called the long-tailed antbird (D. caudata); the reduced D. caudata is now called the East Andean antbird.

The streak-headed antbird's further taxonomy is unsettled. The International Ornithological Committee (IOC) and BirdLife International's Handbook of the Birds of the World (HBW) treat it as monotypic, with no subspecies. The Clements taxonomy splits it into four subspecies on the basis of a 2012 study. The study's authors do caution that further research is needed. Before the split of the long-tailed antbird, all four of them were treated as separate subspecies of it, but the IOC and HBW combined them into the monotypic streak-headed antbird.

This article follows the no-subspecies model.

== Description ==
The streak-headed antbird is 14.5 to 15.5 cm (5.7 to 6.1 in) long and weighs 11 to 13 g (0.39 to 0.46 oz). Adult males have a black crown and back with white streaks and a white patch between the scapulars. Their rump is deep rufous. Their flight feathers are black with rufous edges and their wing coverts black with white tips. Their tail is blackish gray with white tips to the feathers. Their face, throat, and breast are white with heavy black streaks. Their belly is unstreaked white and their flanks and crissum are rufous. Females have the same pattern but different colors than males. Their crown is streaked with cinnamon-rufous and black. They do not have the white interscapular patch. Except for the white tail tips, the areas that are white on the male are rufous-buff on the female. Their underparts have a rufous-buff tinge and their flanks are paler than the male's.

== Distribution and habitat ==
The streak-headed antbird has a disjunct distribution. One population is found in the Colombian Central Andes and on the west slope of the country's Western Andes south along the Andean west slope to central Ecuador. Another is found on the east slope of the Western Andes and south on the Andes' east slope through Ecuador into northern Peru as far as the Department of San Martín. The third is found on the Andes' east slope from central Peru's Department of Huánuco south into Bolivia's La Paz Department. The streak-headed antbird inhabits the understorey to mid-storey of montane evergreen forest and secondary forest. It especially favors bamboo thickets and occurs less frequently in other dense undergrowth such as vine tangles and shrubby forest borders. In elevation it ranges between 1,200 and 3,150 m (3,900 and 10,300 ft) in Colombia, mostly between 1,500 and 2,600 m (4,900 and 8,500 ft) in Ecuador, and between 1,600 and 2,500 m (5,200 and 8,200 ft) in Peru.

== Behavior ==
=== Movement ===
The streak-headed antbird is believed to be a year-round resident throughout its range.

=== Feeding ===
The streak-headed antbird feeds primarily on insects and probably also on spiders. It typically forages by itself, in pairs, or in family groups and sometimes joins mixed-species feeding flocks. It mostly forages between 1 and 15 m (3 and 50 ft) above the ground, and primarily in bamboo. It takes most of its prey by reaching or lunging from a perch and also makes short sallies to overhanging vegetation. It is not known to follow army ants.

=== Breeding ===
The streak-headed antbird's nesting season has not been defined but in northeastern Ecuador includes August. The one known nest was a cup made of thin bamboo leaves with green moss on the outside, suspended from an arched bamboo stem about 2 m (7 ft) above the ground. It contained two nestlings; both parents provisioned them. The incubation period, time to fledging, and other details of parental care are not known.

=== Vocalization ===
The male streak-headed antbird's song is "a loud tchip! tchip! djzzew-djzzew-djzzed-djzew" that the female often answers with a "descending, less buzzy tchip tchip tew-tew-tew". Its calls include "a sharp, ringing pi-pit! and a paired series of descending mewing whistles: dew-dew".

== Status ==
The IUCN has assessed the streak-headed antbird as being of Least Concern. It has a large range; its population size is not known but is believed to be stable. No immediate threats have been identified. It is generally considered fairly common but local, though uncommon in Peru. It occurs in several protected areas, and the "ability of this species to utilize some second-growth habitats may render it less vulnerable than other members of the genus".
