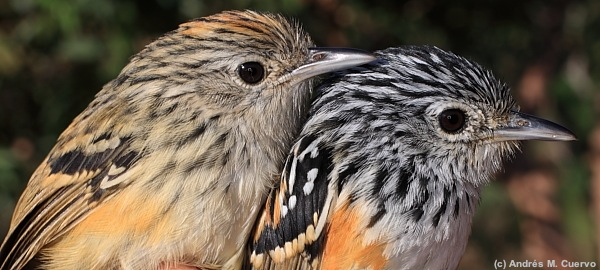

Conservation status
- Least Concern (IUCN 3.1)

Scientific classification
- Kingdom: Animalia
- Phylum: Chordata
- Class: Aves
- Order: Passeriformes
- Family: Thamnophilidae
- Genus: Drymophila
- Species: D. klagesi

Binomial name
- Drymophila klagesi Hellmayr & Seilern, 1912

= Klages's antbird =

Species of bird

Klages's antbird (Drymophila klagesi) is a species of bird in subfamily Thamnophilinae of family Thamnophilidae, the "typical antbirds". It is found in Colombia and Venezuela.

== Taxonomy and systematics ==
Klages's antbird and two other antbird species were previously considered subspecies of what was then called the long-tailed antbird (D. caudata); the reduced D. caudata is now called the East Andean antbird.

Klages's antbird is monotypic.

== Description ==
Klages's antbird is 14.5 to 15.5 cm (5.7 to 6.1 in) long and weighs about 12 g (0.42 oz). Adult males have a black crown and back with thin white streaks except in the center of the crown. Their rump is rufous. Their flight feathers are black with buff edges and their wing coverts black with two white bars. Their tail is dusky with wide white tips to the feathers. Their face, throat, and breast are white with thin black streaks. Their flanks and crissum are bright tawny orange. Females have the same pattern but different colors than males. They are overall duller and their streaking is fainter and sparser. Their crown and nape are streaked with rufous and black. Their upperparts are olive with black streaks, their breast has a buff tinge, and their belly is dull cinnamon-buff.

== Distribution and habitat ==
Klages's antbird has a disjunct distribution. It is found in Colombia's Eastern Andes and their extension into northern Venezuela as far as Lara, in the Serranía del Perijá that also straddles the Colombia/Venezuela border, and in parts of the Venezuelan Coastal Range. It inhabits the understorey to mid-storey of montane evergreen forest and secondary forest. It especially favors bamboo thickets and occurs less frequently in other dense undergrowth such as vine tangles and shrubby forest borders. In elevation it ranges between 500 and 1,500 m (1,600 and 4,900 ft) in Venezuela and reaches 1,800 m (5,900 ft) in the Colombian part of the Serranía del Perijá.

== Behavior ==
=== Movement ===
Klages's antbird is believed to be a year-round resident throughout its range.

=== Feeding ===
The diet of Klages's antbird is not known in detail; it is thought to feed primarily on insects and probably also on spiders. It typically forages in pairs or in family groups and seldom joins mixed-species feeding flocks. It often forages near the ground but also to the subcanopy, usually by lunging from a perch.

=== Breeding ===
The breeding season of Klages's antbird has not been defined but appears to include June. Nothing else is known about the species' breeding biology.

=== Vocalization ===
The song of the male Klages's antbird is "2 clear rhythmic notes then 2 wheezy, asthmatic phrases, chuet, chuet, pa-FJEEE-jit, pa-FJEEE-jit" to which the female adds a "soft descending tu, tu, tu, to, to about half way through".

== Status ==
The IUCN has assessed Klages's antbird as being of Least Concern. Its population size is not known but is believed to be stable. No immediate threats have been identified. It is considered common on the Paria Peninsula in Venezuela and more local in other sections of the Coastal Range and the Andes. It is known from only two locations in the Serranía del Perijá. It occurs in several protected areas and the species' "ability of this species to utilize some second-growth habitats may render it less vulnerable than other members of the genus".
