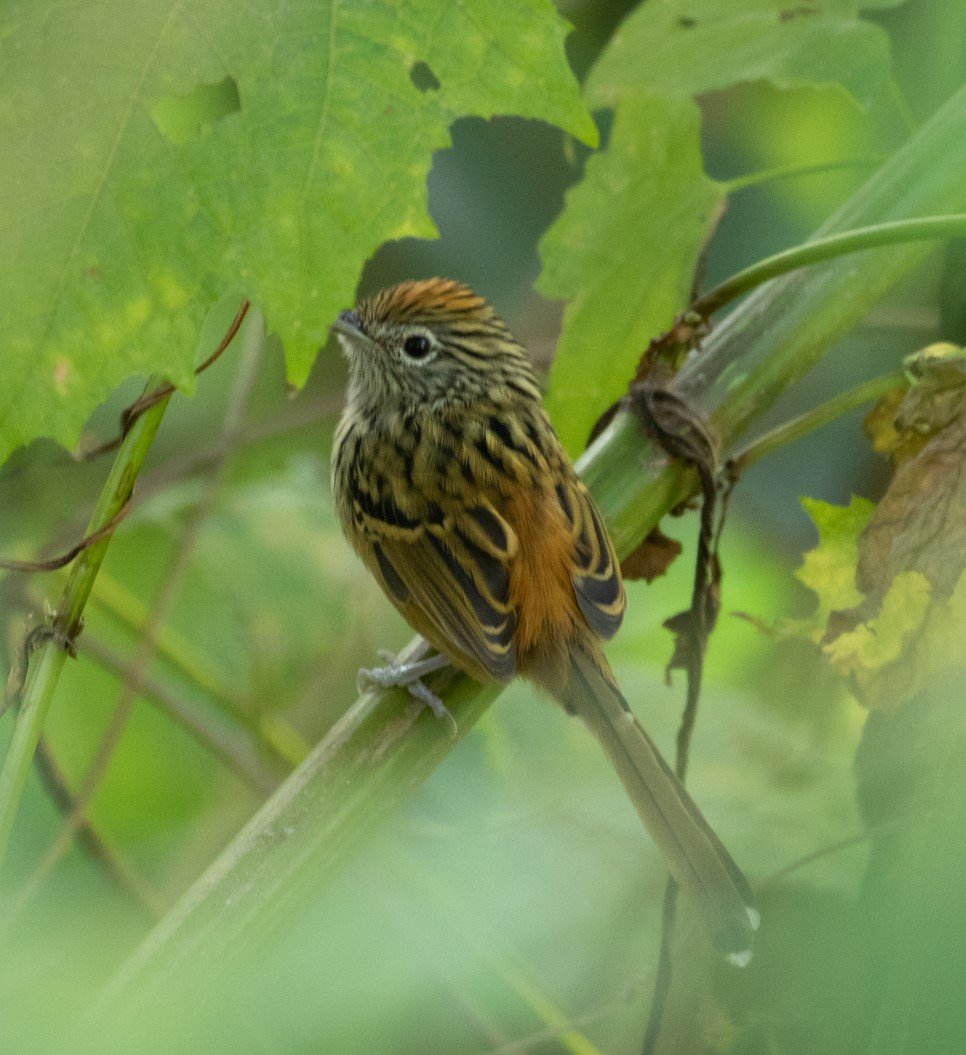
- In Magdalena, Colombia

Conservation status
- Near Threatened (IUCN 3.1)

Scientific classification
- Kingdom: Animalia
- Phylum: Chordata
- Class: Aves
- Order: Passeriformes
- Family: Thamnophilidae
- Genus: Drymophila
- Species: D. hellmayri

Binomial name
- Drymophila hellmayri Todd, 1915

= Santa Marta antbird =

Species of bird

The Santa Marta antbird (Drymophila hellmayri) is a Near Threatened species of bird in subfamily Thamnophilinae of family Thamnophilidae, the "typical antbirds". It is endemic to the Sierra Nevada de Santa Marta in Colombia.

== Taxonomy and systematics ==
The Santa Marta antbird and two other antbird species were previously considered subspecies of what was then called the long-tailed antbird (D. caudata); the reduced D. caudata is now called the East Andean antbird.

The Santa Marta antbird is monotypic.

== Description ==
The Santa Marta antbird is 14.5 to 15.5 cm (5.7 to 6.1 in) long. Adult males have a black crown and back with thin white streaks except in the center of the crown. Their rump is gray with a reddish tinge. Their flight feathers are black with buff edges and their wing coverts black with two white bars. Their tail is dusky olive with white tips to the feathers and dark band above them. Their face, throat, and breast are white with bold black streaks. Their flanks and crissum are bright rufous. Females have the same pattern but different colors than males. Their upperparts have cinnamon-buff rather than white streaks and their underparts are pale buff.

== Distribution and habitat ==
The Santa Marta antbird is found only in the foothills of northern Colombia's isolated Sierra Nevada de Santa Marta. It inhabits the understorey to mid-storey of evergreen forest and secondary forest. It favors dense undergrowth and bamboo thickets. In elevation it ranges mostly between 500 and 1,500 m (1,600 and 4,900 ft).

== Behavior ==
=== Movement ===
The Santa Marta antbird is believed to be a year-round resident throughout its range.

=== Feeding ===
The Santa Marta antbird's diet is not known in detail; it is thought to feed primarily on insects and probably also on spiders. It typically forages in pairs or in family groups and does not join mixed-species feeding flocks. Nothing else is known about its foraging behavior.

=== Breeding ===
Nothing is known about the Santa Marta antbird's breeding biology.

=== Vocalization ===
The Santa Marta antbird's song has two short introductory notes followed by two or more longer raspy notes such as "cheeyt-cheeyt, wheeyz-wheeyz-wheeyz".

== Status ==
The IUCN has assessed the Santa Marta antbird as Near Threatened. It has a relatively small range and its estimated population of fewer than 9000 mature individuals is believed to be decreasing. "Forest within its altitudinal range is being cleared for coffee and illegal marijuana plantations. Remaining habitat is threatened by agricultural expansion, logging, burning and drought." It does occur in one protected area, the private El Dorado Bird Reserve.
