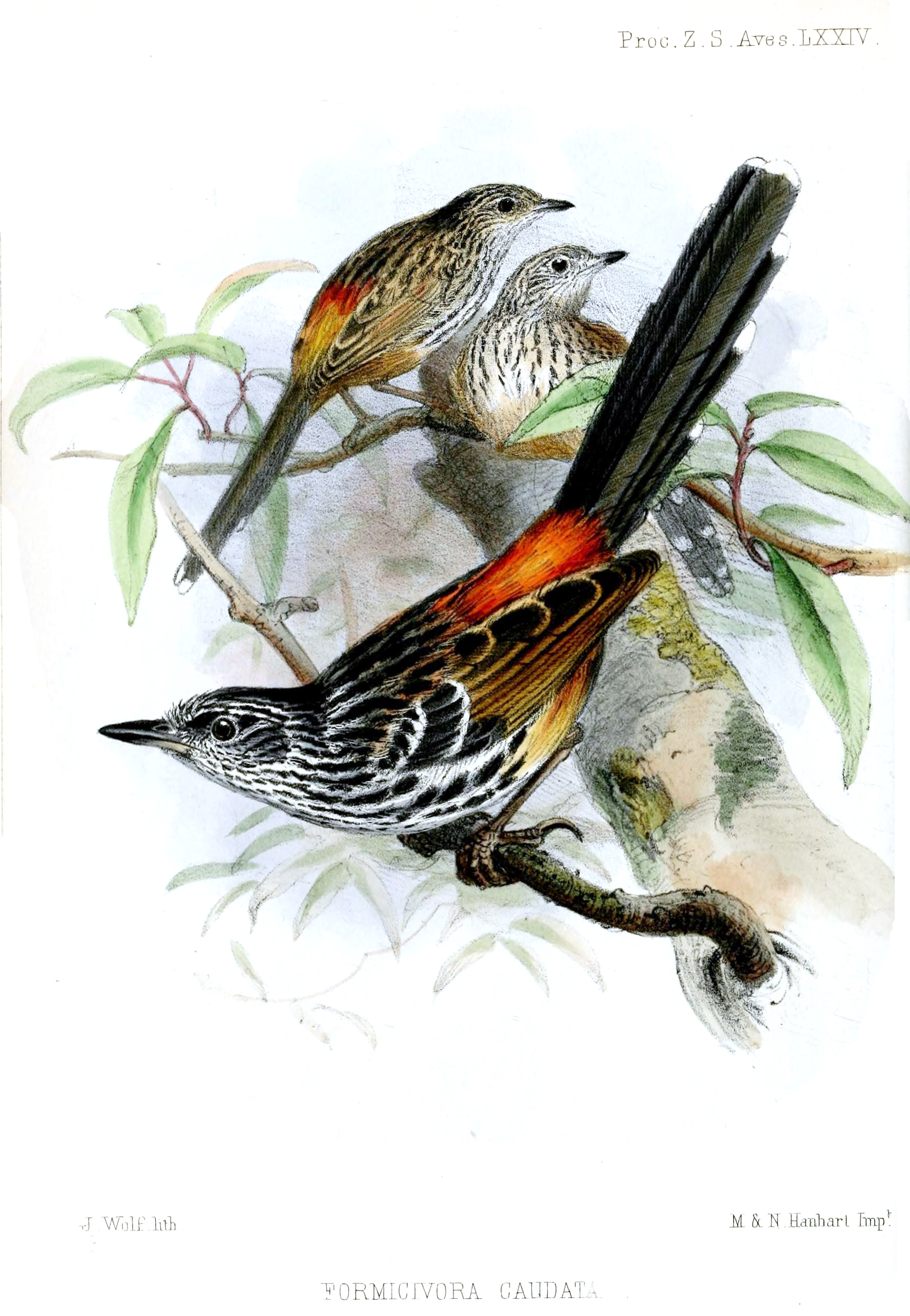

Conservation status
- Least Concern (IUCN 3.1)

Scientific classification
- Kingdom: Animalia
- Phylum: Chordata
- Class: Aves
- Order: Passeriformes
- Family: Thamnophilidae
- Genus: Drymophila
- Species: D. caudata

Binomial name
- Drymophila caudata (Sclater, PL, 1855)

= East Andean antbird =

Species of bird

The East Andean antbird (Drymophila caudata) is a species of bird in subfamily Thamnophilinae of family Thamnophilidae, the "typical antbirds". It is endemic to Colombia.

== Taxonomy and systematics ==
The East Andean antbird was described by the English zoologist Philip Sclater in 1855 and given the binomial name Formicivora caudata.

The East Andean antbird is monotypic. However, under the name "long-tailed antbird" Formicivora caudata previously included what are now Klages's antbird (D. klagesi), the Santa Marta antbird (D. hellmayri), and the streak-headed antbird (D. striaticeps).

== Description ==
The East Andean antbird is 14.5 to 15.5 cm (5.7 to 6.1 in) long and weighs 11 to 13 g (0.39 to 0.46 oz). Adult males have a black crown and back with white streaks except in the solid black center of the crown, and a white patch between the scapulars. Their rump is rufous. Their flight feathers are black with rufous edges and their wing coverts black with white tips. Their tail is blackish gray with white tips to the feathers. Their face, throat, and breast are white with heavy black streaks. Their belly is unstreaked white and their flanks and crissum are rufous. Females have the same pattern but different colors than males. Their crown is streaked with cinnamon-rufous and black. They do not have the white interscapular patch. Except for the white tail tips, the areas that are white on the male are rufous-buff on the female. Their underparts have a rufous-buff tinge and their flanks are paler than the male's.

== Distribution and habitat ==
The East Andean antbird has a disjunct distribution in Colombia. One population is found on the west slope of the Eastern Andes in Santander Department and another further south in the upper Magdalena River Valley in Caquetá and Huila departments. It might have previously also been found in Boyacá and Cundinamarca departments. It inhabits the understorey to mid-storey of montane evergreen forest and secondary forest. It especially favors bamboo thickets and occurs less frequently in other dense undergrowth such as vine tangles and shrubby forest borders. Its elevational range is not well known but it may occur as high as 3,150 m (10,300 ft).

== Behavior ==
=== Movement ===
The East Andean antbird is believed to be a year-round resident throughout its range.

=== Feeding ===
The East Andean antbird's diet and feeding behavior are very poorly known. Both are presumed to be similar to those of the more widespread streak-headed antbird. That species feeds primarily on insects and probably also on spiders. It typically forages by itself, in pairs, or in family groups and sometimes joins mixed-species feeding flocks. It mostly forages between 1 and 15 m (3 and 50 ft) above the ground, and primarily in bamboo. It takes most of its prey by reaching or lunging from a perch and also makes short sallies to overhanging vegetation. It is not known to follow army ants.

=== Breeding ===
Nothing is known about the East Andean antbird's breeding biology.

=== Vocalization ===
The East Andean antbird's song is similar to that of other Drymophila antbirds. However, most of theirs have two even-pitched introductory notes (e.g. "tchip! tchip! djzzew-djzzew-djzzed-djzew") while the East Andean's starts with four to six rising notes. The calls of all of the Drymophila antbirds appear to be similar, for example "a sharp, ringing pi-pit! and a paired series of descending mewing whistles: dew-dew".

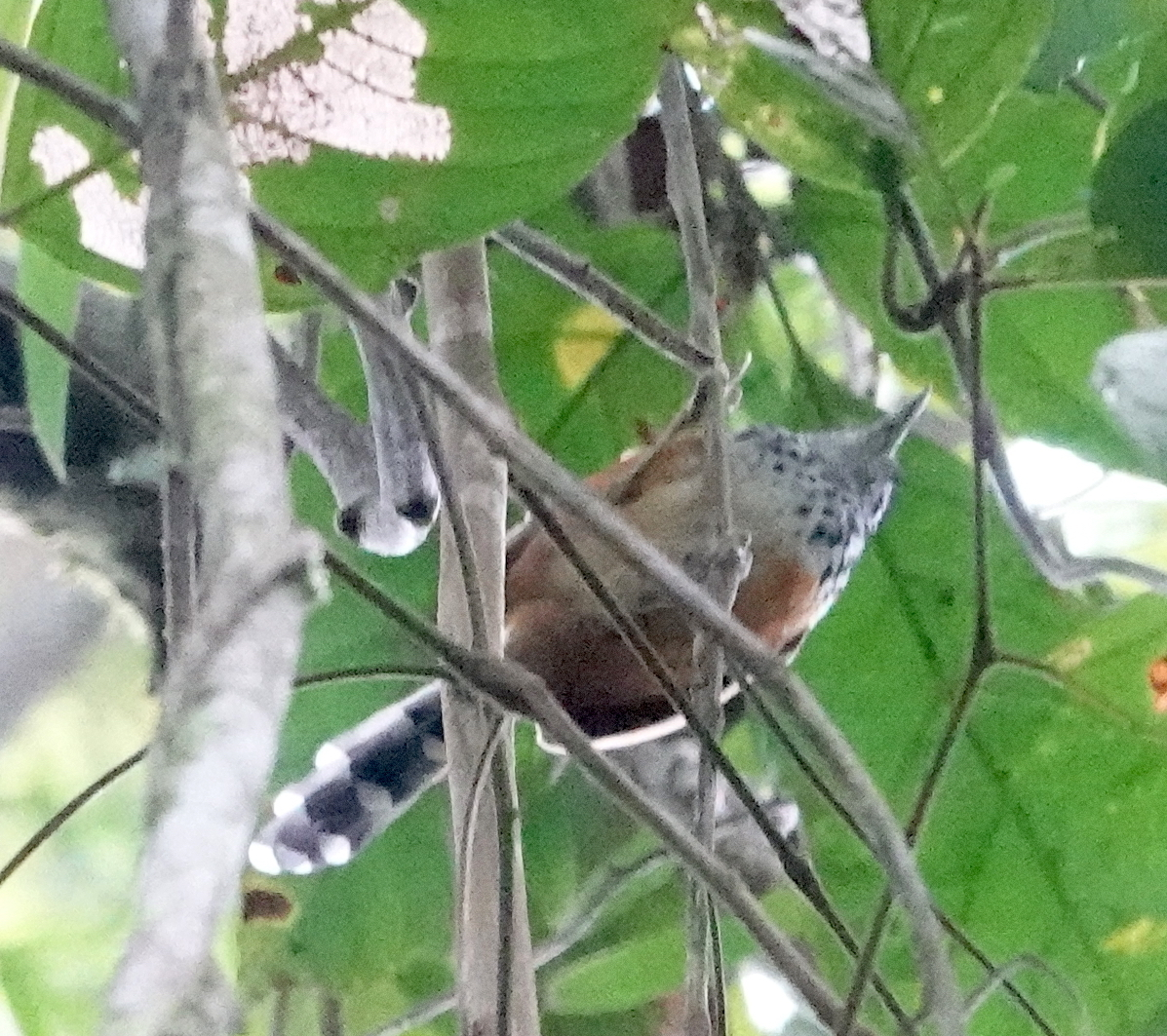
Live bird

== Status ==
The IUCN originally in 2016 assessed the East Andean antbird as Near Threatened but in 2023 downlisted it to being of Least Concern. Its estimated population of 3000 to 6700 mature individuals is believed to be decreasing. "Threats are not well known, but it is likely susceptible to large-scale loss and degradation of forests and removal of bamboo stands for selective logging and conversion into agricultural land and livestock pastures." It is a very poorly known species but has been recorded in two protected areas.
