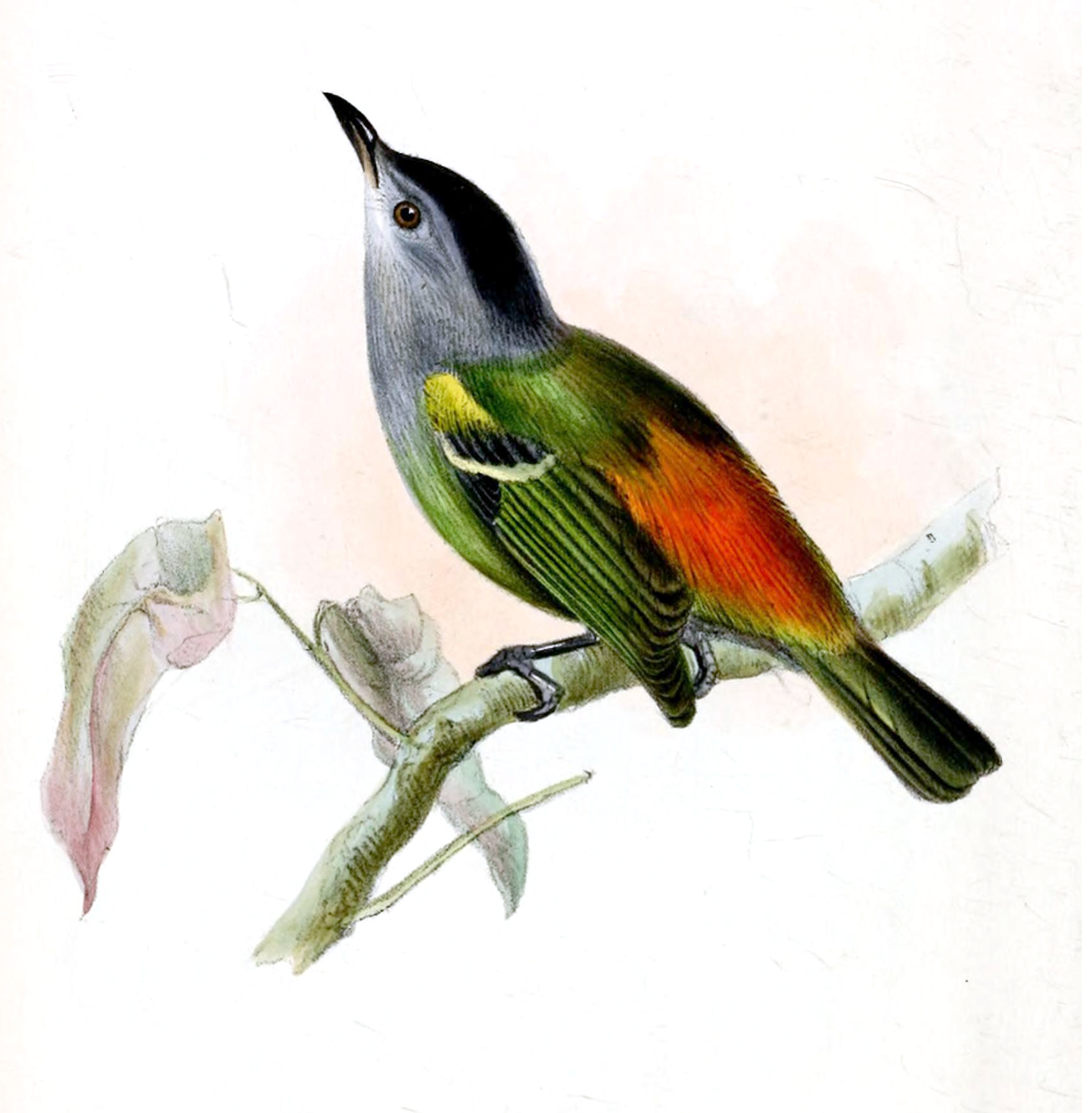

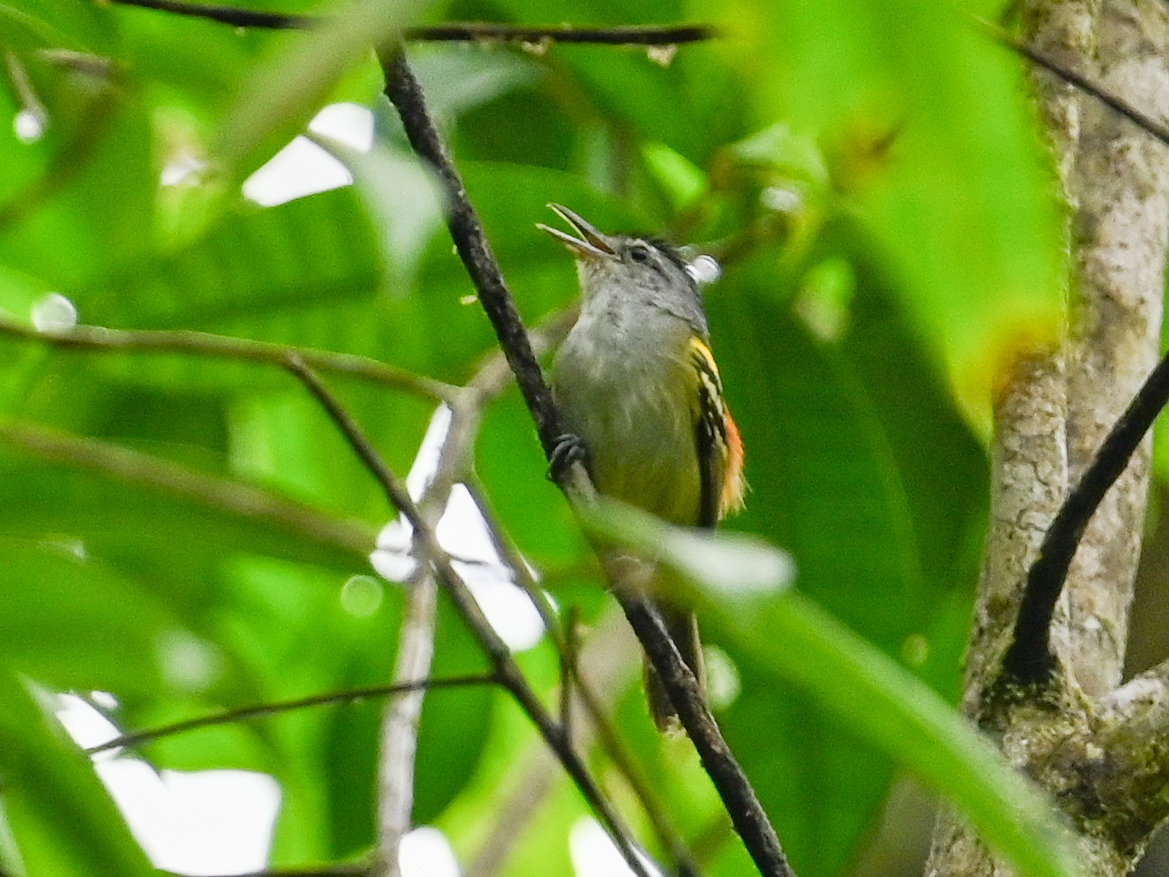

Conservation status
- Least Concern (IUCN 3.1)

Scientific classification
- Kingdom: Animalia
- Phylum: Chordata
- Class: Aves
- Order: Passeriformes
- Family: Thamnophilidae
- Genus: Euchrepomis
- Species: E. callinota

Binomial name
- Euchrepomis callinota (Sclater, PL, 1855)
- Ranges of E. c. callinota and E. c. peruviana; those of E. c. venezuelana and E. c. guianensis omitted

Synonyms
- Terenura callinota

= Rufous-rumped antwren =

Species of bird

The rufous-rumped antwren (Euchrepomis callinota) is a species of bird in subfamily Euchrepomidinae of family Thamnophilidae, the "typical antbirds". It is found in Colombia, Costa Rica, Ecuador, French Guiana, Guyana, Panama, Peru, Suriname, and Venezuela.

== Taxonomy and systematics ==
The rufous-rumped antwren was described by the English zoologist Philip Sclater in 1855 and given the binomial name Formicivora callinota. It was transferred to genus Terenura in 1885. There it remained until the current genus Euchrepomis was created in 2012 following phylogenetic analysis.

The rufous-rumped antwren has these four subspecies:

- Euchrepomis callinota callinota (Sclater, PL, 1855)
- Euchrepomis callinota peruviana (Meyer de Schauensee, 1945)
- Euchrepomis callinota venezuelana (Phelps, WH & Phelps, WH Jr, 1954)
- Euchrepomis callinota guianensis (Blake, 1949)

== Description ==
The rufous-rumped antwren is 10 to 12 cm (3.9 to 4.7 in) long and weighs about 7 to 9.5 g (0.25 to 0.34 oz). It is small, slender, and long-tailed, and somewhat resembles a greenlet or New World warbler. The sexes have different plumage. Adult males of the nominate subspecies E. c. callinota have blackish lores and line through the eye on an otherwise pale gray face. Their crown and nape are black, their upper back olive, their lower back and rump bright rufous or orange brown, and their uppertail coverts olive. Their tail is dusky with olive edges on the feathers. Their wing coverts are slate gray with pale yellow tips that form two bars on the closed wing; their flight feathers are dusky with olive edges. Their throat and breast are pale gray and their belly and undertail coverts are pale yellow-green. Adult females have a brownish olive crown and grayish olive sides of their head. In both sexes, their iris is brown or dark brown, their maxilla black, their mandible shades of gray with a black tip, and their legs and feet bluish gray or gray.

Subspecies E. c. peruviana is very similar to the nominate but their lower breast has a yellowish green tinge giving a gradual transition from the gray breast to the yellow-green belly. Subspecies E. c. venezuelana is known well only from the holotype, a female. Its nape and upper back are darker than the nominate's, its throat whiter, and its belly a paler yellow. E. c. guianensis has a darker and richer olive back than the nominate, with brighter yellow on the wing coverts.

== Distribution and habitat ==
The rufous-rumped antwren has a highly disjunct distribution. The nominate subspecies is by far the most widespread and has several separate populations. The northernmost is found on the eastern slope of the Cordillera de Talamanca in Costa Rica and Panama. The others are found in the Serranía del Darién and Santander department, south on the west slope of the Andes into Ecuador as far as El Oro Province, and on the east slope of the Andes from Sucumbíos Province in Ecuador south into northern Peru's Cajamarca and Amazonas departments. Subspecies E. c. peruviana is found south of the Marañón River in central and southeastern Peru between the departments of San Martín and Cuzco. E. c. venezuelana is found in the Serranía del Perijá that straddles the Colombia-Venezuela border and in the Andes of the Venezuelan states of Mérida and Barinas. E. c. guianensis is found in southern Guyana, central Suriname, and central French Guiana.

The rufous-rumped antwren inhabits the interior and edges of humid foothill and montane forest. In elevation it ranges between 700 and 1,200 m (2,300 and 3,900 ft) in Costa Rica, between 700 and 2,500 m (2,300 and 8,200 ft) in Colombia, and between 900 and 1,800 m (3,000 and 5,900 ft) in Ecuador. In most of Peru it ranges between 1,050 and 2,000 m (3,400 and 6,600 ft) but occurs between 750 and 1,000 m (2,500 and 3,300 ft) in Cuzco.

== Behavior ==
=== Movement ===
The rufous-rumped antwren is a year-round resident throughout its range.

=== Feeding ===
The rufous-rumped antwren feeds on arthropods, though details of its diet are lacking. It typically forages in pairs that usually join mixed-species feeding flocks. It forages almost entirely in the forest canopy, acrobatically gleaning prey from leaves and sticks.

=== Breeding ===
The rufous-rumped antwren's breeding season in Costa Rica appears to be from February through May. Nothing else is known about its breeding biology.

=== Vocalization ===
The rufous-rumped antwren's song is described as "a rapidly uttered, high-pitched tsii-tsii-tsi-tsi-titititititititi that accelerates into a fast chipper or trill" and similarly as "an accelerating, rising series of high, thin notes ending in a falling, chippering trill: tew tew-tew-ti-ti-ti't't't't't't'ti". Its calls include "high tsi and ti notes".

== Status ==
The IUCN has assessed the rufous-rumped antwren as being of Least Concern. It has a very large range and an estimated population of at least 50,000 mature individuals, though the latter is believed to be decreasing. No immediate threats have been identified. It is considered rare in Costa Rica and uncommon in Colombia, Ecuador, and Peru. "There are no quantitative data on human effects on Rufous-rumped Antwren, but throughout its range it is vulnerable to habitat loss or degradation by human activities such as forest clearing for agriculture."
