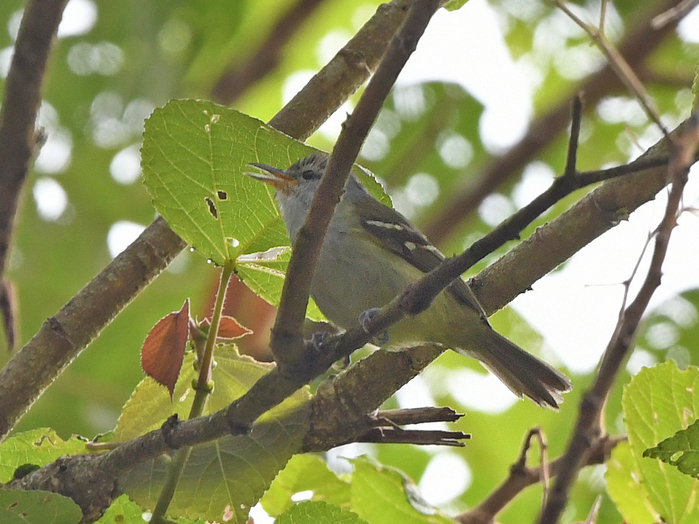

Conservation status
- Near Threatened (IUCN 3.1)

Scientific classification
- Kingdom: Animalia
- Phylum: Chordata
- Class: Aves
- Order: Passeriformes
- Family: Thamnophilidae
- Genus: Euchrepomis
- Species: E. sharpei

Binomial name
- Euchrepomis sharpei (Berlepsch, 1901)

Synonyms
- Terenura sharpei

= Yellow-rumped antwren =

Species of bird

The yellow-rumped antwren (Euchrepomis sharpei) is Near Threatened species of bird in subfamily Euchrepomidinae of family Thamnophilidae, the "typical antbirds". It is found in Bolivia and Peru.

== Taxonomy and systematics ==
The yellow-rumped antwren was described by the German ornithologist Hans von Berlepsch in 1901 and given the binomial name Terenura sharpei. There it remained until the current genus Euchrepomis was created in 2012 following phylogenetic analysis.

The yellow-rumped antwren is monotypic.

== Description ==
The yellow-rumped antwren is 9.5 to 10.5 cm (3.7 to 4.1 in) long and weighs about 7 to 8 g (0.25 to 0.28 oz). It is a small and slim antwren with a thin bill and a longish tail. The sexes have different plumage. Adult males have a grayish white supercilium and a thin dark line through the eye on an otherwise pale gray face. Their crown and nape are black, their back olive, and their lower back and rump bright yellow with black edges on the back feathers. Their tail is grayish olive. Their wing coverts are blackish gray with yellow tips that form two bars on the closed wing, their flight feathers blackish gray with an olive wash, and the bend of the wing yellow. Their throat and breast are pale gray that becomes more yellow on their belly and undertail coverts. Adult females have an olive-brown crown, nape, and eyeline, a gray supercilium, dull olive-brown wings with at most a trace of yellow at the bend, and a more olive-yellow lower back and rump than males. In both sexes their iris is blackish or brown, their maxilla black or blackish to gray, their mandible pale gray, and their legs and feet blackish to blue-gray.

== Distribution and habitat ==
The yellow-rumped antwren is found in the Yungas bioregion on the east slope of the Andes of Peru and Bolivia. It occurs in southeastern Peru from eastern Cuzco Department through Puno Department and possibly Madre de Dios Department into western Bolivia where its range continues through La Paz Department into Cochabamba Department. However, it is not found continuously within that area. In Cuzco it occurs in and near Manu National Park. There are only two records in Puno. Sites in Bolivia include along the Cochabamba-Villa Tunari road, Chapare, Cochabamba; on the Rio Paracti, Chapare, Cochabamba; and on Cerro Asunta Plata, La Paz. There are also records from the 1970s, 1980s and 1990s in the Serranía Bellavista north of Caranavi, La Paz but playback experiments there in 2005 did not find the species. The species is readily overlooked and may occur at other sites within and without its known range.

The yellow-rumped antwren inhabits the lower and middle elevations of Yungas cloudforest, where it favors emergent canopy trees in undisturbed primary forest. In elevation it mostly occurs in a narrow band between 1,100 and 1,680 m (3,600 and 5,500 ft) but does occur as low as 750 m (2,500 ft).

== Behavior ==
=== Movement ===
The yellow-rumped antwren is a year-round resident throughout its range.

=== Feeding ===
The yellow-rumped antwren feeds on arthropods but details of its diet are lacking. It typically forages in pairs though small family groups have been observed, and it almost always is seen as a member of a large mixed-species feeding flock. It forages high in the canopy, moving quickly and acrobatically through dense foliage and vine tangles.

=== Breeding ===
The yellow-rumped antwren's breeding biology is little known. It appears to breed in the rainy season that begins in November, and is highly vocal and territorial in most months between June and December.

=== Vocalization ===
The yellow-rumped antwren's song is "a series of initially countable notes rising in pitch and shortening in length, and rapidly becoming a high-pitched trill of some 49 notes". Another vocalization is "a rich, sweet tsyu".

== Status ==
The IUCN originally in 1988 assessed the yellow-rumped antwren as Threatened, then in 1994 as Vulnerable, and in 2000 as Endangered. In late 2022 it downlisted the species to Near Threatened. It has a very limited range and its estimated population of 2500 to 10,000 mature individuals is believed to be decreasing. "Accessible areas with suitable habitat are being cleared for cultivation of coffee, citrus fruit and, at lower altitudes, coca and tea [but] large tracts of pristine habitat remain within the range and tree cover loss is currently [2022] low, albeit accelerating in recent years." It is known to occur in Manu National Park; other protected areas are within its nominal range but its presence or absence in them is not known.
