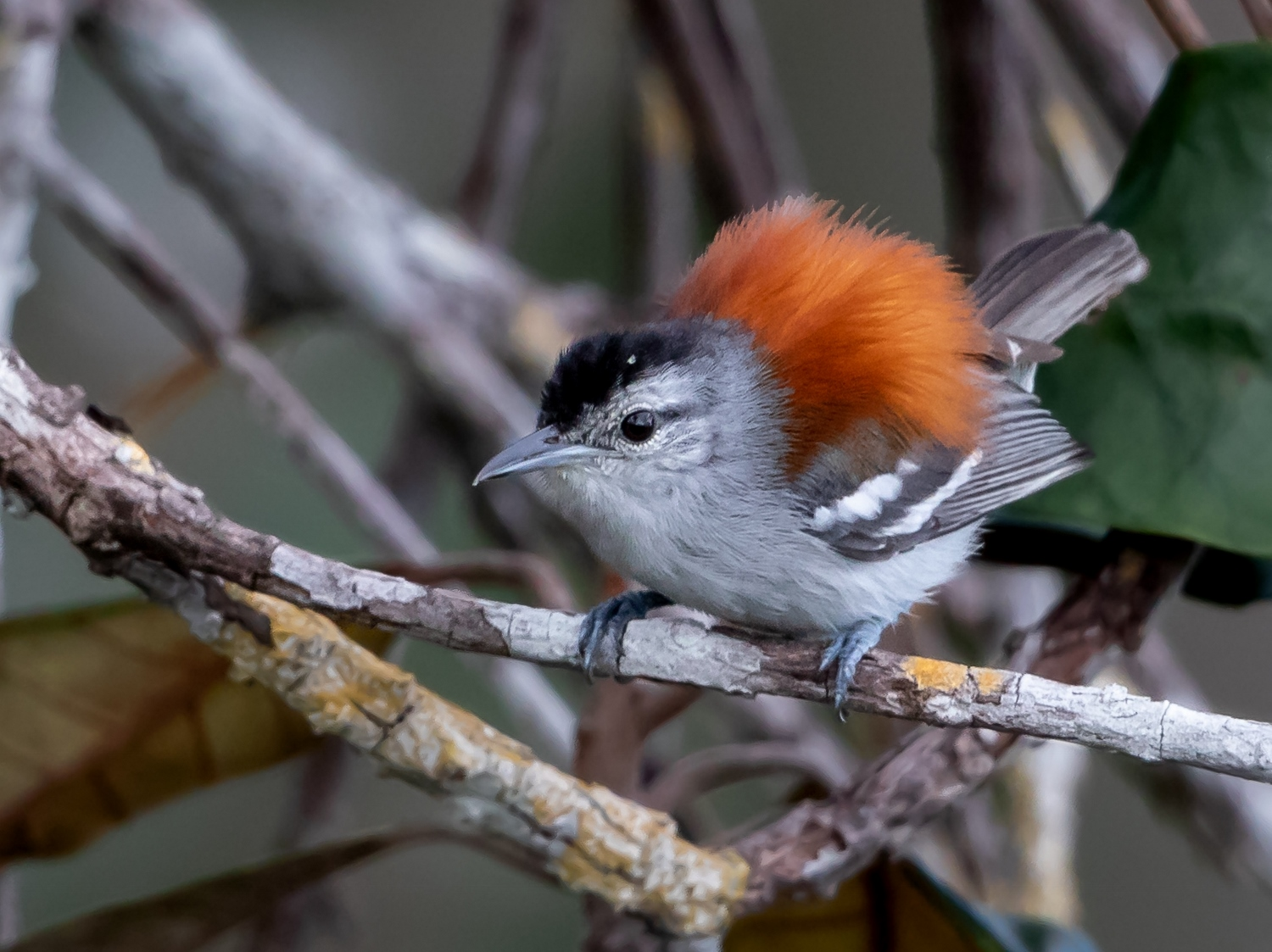
- A male at Manaus, Amazonas state, Brazil

Conservation status
- Least Concern (IUCN 3.1)

Scientific classification
- Kingdom: Animalia
- Phylum: Chordata
- Class: Aves
- Order: Passeriformes
- Family: Thamnophilidae
- Genus: Euchrepomis
- Species: E. spodioptila

Binomial name
- Euchrepomis spodioptila (Sclater, PL & Salvin, 1881)

Synonyms
- Terenura spodioptila

= Ash-winged antwren =

Species of bird

The ash-winged antwren (Euchrepomis spodioptila) is a species of bird in subfamily Euchrepomidinae of family Thamnophilidae, the "typical antbirds". It is found in Brazil, Colombia, Ecuador, French Guiana, Guyana, Suriname, Venezuela, and possibly Peru.

== Taxonomy and systematics ==
The ash-winged antwren was described and illustrated by the English ornithologists Philip Sclater and Osbert Salvin in 1881 and given the binomial name Terenura spodioptila. There it remained until the current genus Euchrepomis was created in 2012 following phylogenetic analysis.

The ash-winged antwren has three subspecies, the nominate E. s. spodioptila (Sclater, PL & Salvin, 1881), E. s. signata (Zimmer, JT, 1932), and E. s. meridionalis (Snethlage, E, 1925).

== Description ==
The ash-winged antwren is 9.5 to 11 cm (3.7 to 4.3 in) long and weighs about 6.5 to 7.5 g (0.23 to 0.26 oz). The sexes have different plumage. Adult males of the nominate subspecies have a whitish supercilium and a thin dark line through the eye on an otherwise gray face. Their crown and nape are black, their back, rump, and uppertail coverts rufous-chestnut, and their tail gray-brown. Their wing coverts are black with white tips that form two bars on the closed wing and their flight feathers black with pale gray edges. Their entire underparts are pale gray that is lightest on the throat and belly. Adult females have a yellowish brown crown, nape, and upper back; their supercilium, throat, breast, and flanks have a buffy-brown tinge. Subadults of both sexes have olive-green edges on their flight feathers. Subspecies E. s. signata males have chestnut lesser wing coverts. Subspecies E. s. meridionalis has olive edges on its flight feathers and a greenish yellow tinge on the tips of the wing coverts and the belly.

== Distribution and habitat ==
The ash-winged antwren has a disjunct distribution. Its subspecies are found thus:

- E. s. signata: A disjunct distribution. One population extends from southeastern Colombia's Caquetá Department into extreme northeastern Ecuador and northeastern Peru (but see below). The other extends from Guainía Department in eastern Colombia into northwestern Brazil's upper Rio Negro region. (It may also occur in Colombia's Guaviare Department connecting the two populations.)
- E. s. spodioptila: from Amazonas and Bolívar states in southeastern Venezuela east through the Guianas and through Amazonian Brazil as far east as northern Pará.
- E. s. meridionalis: south central Amazonian Brazil between the rios Madeira and Tapajós

The South American Classification Committee of the American Ornithological Society has no documented records from Peru and so treats the ash-winged antwren as hypothetical in that country.

The ash-winged antwren inhabits lowland evergreen forest, primarily terra firme. It almost exclusively stays in the forest subcanopy and canopy. In elevation it mostly occurs below 600 m (2,000 ft) but is found as high as 1,100 m (3,600 ft) in the tepuis of Venezuela and Brazil.

== Behavior ==
=== Movement ===
The ash-winged antwren is thought to be a year-round resident throughout its range.

=== Feeding ===
The ash-winged antwren feeds on arthropods but details of its diet are lacking. It typically forages in pairs though single birds and small family groups have been observed, and it almost always is seen as a member of a mixed-species feeding flock. It forages high in the canopy, moving quickly and acrobatically through dense foliage.

=== Breeding ===
The ash-winged antwren's breeding season appears to include November and December but nothing else is known about its breeding biology.

=== Vocalization ===
The song of the nominate subspecies and the Brazilian population of E. s. signata is a "very high, thin, bouncing, descending, trilled rattle ending in 3 well-separated notes, like 'tsee-tsee-tsee-tsititrtrtr-tuut-tuut-tuut' ". The song of E. s. meridionalis and the Peruvian population of E. s. signata lacks the three terminal notes. The species' call is "short and abrupt, sometimes in short series in which notes change pitch".

== Status ==
The IUCN has assessed the ash-winged antwren as being of Least Concern. It has a very large range but its population size is not known and is believed to be decreasing. No immediate threats have been identified. It is considered fairly common in most of its range but is very scarce in Ecuador and "rather uncommon" in Colombia. It occurs in several protected areas, and also in "contiguous expanses of intact suitable habitat that are not formally protected, but seem to be at little risk of being developed in [the] near future".
