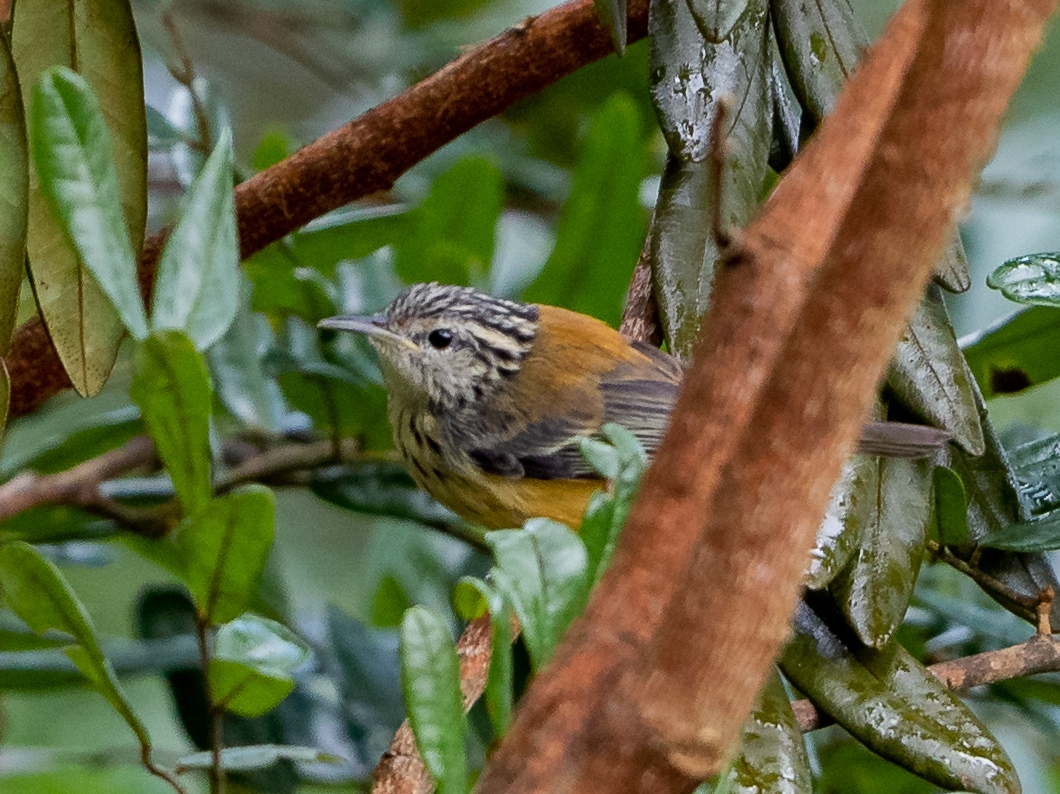
- Female T. sicki in Pernambuco, Brazil
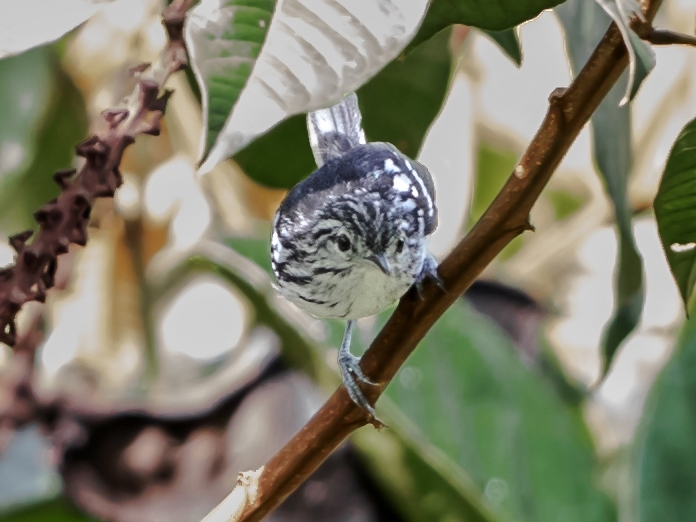
- Male T. sicki in Pernambuco, Brazil

Conservation status
- Critically Endangered (IUCN 3.1)

Scientific classification
- Kingdom: Animalia
- Phylum: Chordata
- Class: Aves
- Order: Passeriformes
- Family: Thamnophilidae
- Genus: Terenura
- Species: T. sicki

Binomial name
- Terenura sicki Teixeira & Gonzaga, 1983

= Orange-bellied antwren =

Species of bird in Brazil

The orange-bellied antwren (Terenura sicki) or Sick's antwren, is a Critically Endangered species of bird in subfamily Thamnophilinae of family Thamnophilidae, the "typical antbirds". It is endemic to Brazil.

== Taxonomy and systematics ==
The orange-bellied antwren is monotypic. It shares genus Terenura with the streak-capped antwren (T. maculata); the two are sister species and may form a superspecies.

== Description ==
The orange-bellied antwren is 9.5 to 10.5 cm (3.74 to 4.13 in) long and weighs 6.5 to 7 g (0.23 to 0.25 oz). Adult males' crown, nape, and upper back are streaked black and white. The rest of their upperparts are black with a few white streaks; they have a hidden white patch between the shoulders. Their wings are black with pale edges on the flight feathers and wide white tips on the coverts. Their tail is blackish. Their throat and underparts are white. Adult females have a rufous back and rump and orange underparts. The white streaks on their head have a pale buff tinge.

== Distribution and habitat ==
The orange-bellied antwren has a disjunct distribution in the northeastern Brazilian states of Pernambuco and Alagoas. It inhabits the subcanopy and canopy of semi-humid evergreen forest. In elevation it mostly ranges between 200 and 700 m (660 and 2,300 ft) but occurs as low as 100 metres (330 ft).

== Behavior ==
=== Movement ===
The orange-bellied antwren is a year-round resident throughout its range.

=== Feeding ===
The orange-bellied antwren's diet is not known in detail but is mostly insects and probably includes spiders. It forages singly, in pairs, or in family groups, and often though not habitually as part of a mixed-species feeding flock. It feeds mostly between about 7 and 20 m (20 and 70 ft) above the ground though sometimes as low as 5 m (20 ft). It actively and restlessly gleans its prey in dense vegetation, mostly in vine tangles. It typically gleans while perched or with short lunges. It sometimes makes short sallies to hover-glean. It is not known to follow army ant swarms.

=== Breeding ===
The orange-bellied antwren's breeding season is thought to span from November to February. Its nest is a small cup of moss and fungal fibers, hung from a fork near the end of a branch typically about 10 to 12 m (30 to 40 ft) above the ground. The clutch size, incubation period, time to fledging, and details of parental care are not known.

=== Vocalization ===
The orange-bellied antwren's song is a "very high, very sharp 'tewée-tuwée-tititititi', diminishing in strength". Its calls are a "sharp 'chip' and slightly longer, lower downslurred note".

== Status ==
The IUCN originally in 1988 assessed the orange-bellied antwren as Threatened, then in 1994 as Vulnerable, in 2000 as Endangered, and since 2016 as Critically Endangered. It has a very small and fragmented range and its estimated population of 50 to 250 mature individuals is believed to be decreasing. It is known from about 10 locations. The principal threat is ongoing habitat destruction. "There has been massive clearance of Atlantic forest in Alagoas and Pernambuco, largely as a result of logging and conversion to sugarcane plantations and pasture." It does occur in a few nominally protected areas but some of them are still logged.
