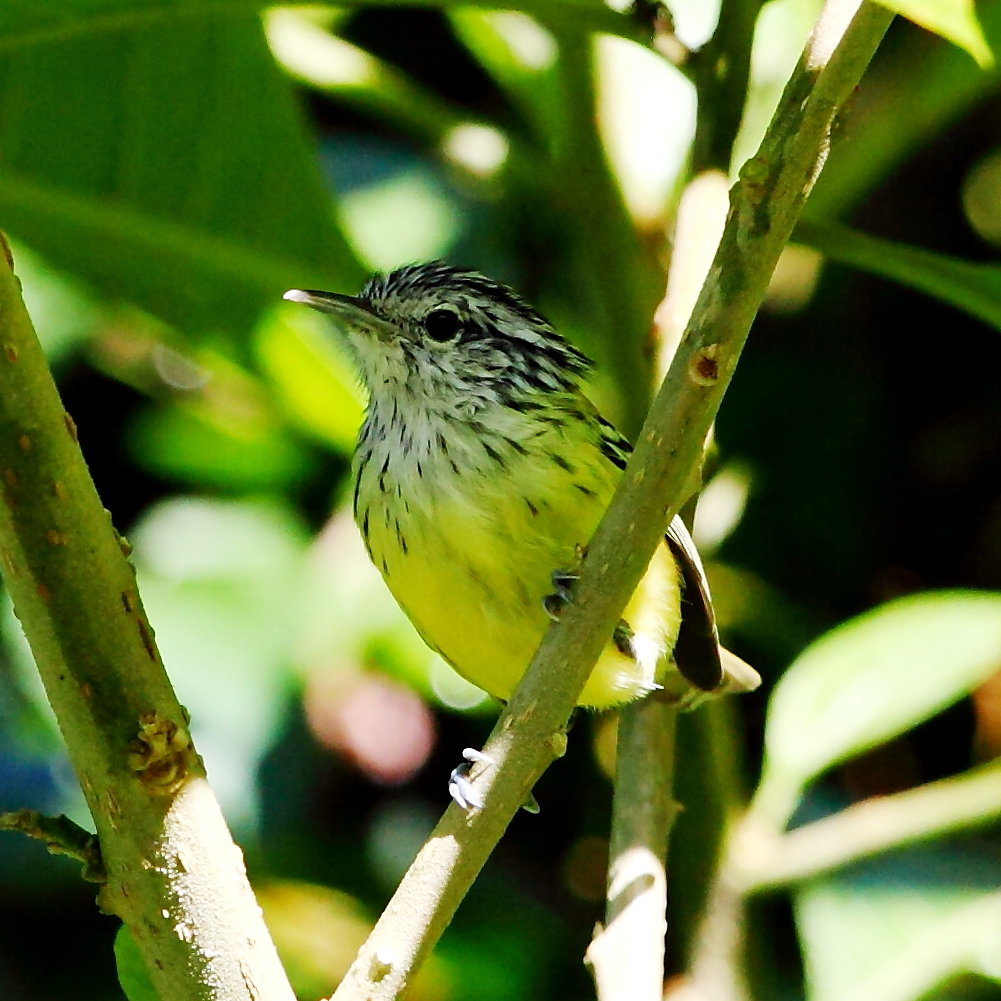
- Male at Angra dos Reis, State of Rio de Janeiro, Brazil

Conservation status
- Least Concern (IUCN 3.1)

Scientific classification
- Kingdom: Animalia
- Phylum: Chordata
- Class: Aves
- Order: Passeriformes
- Family: Thamnophilidae
- Genus: Terenura
- Species: T. maculata

Binomial name
- Terenura maculata (Wied, 1831)

= Streak-capped antwren =

Species of bird

The streak-capped antwren (Terenura maculata) is a species of bird in subfamily Thamnophilinae of family Thamnophilidae, the "typical antbirds". It is found in Argentina, Brazil, and Paraguay.

== Taxonomy and systematics ==
The streak-capped antwren is monotypic. It shares genus Terenura with the orange-bellied antwren (T. sicki); the two are sister species and may form a superspecies.

== Description ==
The streak-capped antwren is 9 to 10 cm (3.5 to 3.9 in) long; one individual weighed 6.5 g (0.23 oz). Adult males' crown, nape, and upper back are streaked black and white. The rest of their upperparts are tawny to chestnut with some yellow mixed in on the rump; they have a hidden white patch between the shoulders. Their wings are black with pale yellow edges on the flight feathers (tawny on the tertials) and white tips on the coverts. Their tail is olive-gray. Their throat and upper breast are white with black streaks, their lower breast yellow with black streaks, and their belly and undertail coverts unstreaked yellow. Adult females are much like males, though paler overall. The white streaks on their head and nape have a pale buff tinge and the streaking on their underparts is less distinct than the male's.

== Distribution and habitat ==
The streak-capped antwren is a bird of the southern Atlantic Forest. It is found coastally in Brazil from Bahia to Santa Catarina and inland in Minas Gerais, São Paulo, and Paraná. Its range continues into eastern Paraguay between Canindeyú and Caazapá departments, and also extreme northeastern Argentina's Misiones Province. It inhabits evergreen forest and secondary woodland; it is found in the forest's mid-storey and canopy. In elevation it ranges from sea level to 1,250 m (4,100 ft).

== Behavior ==
=== Movement ===
The streak-capped antwren is believed to be a year-round resident throughout its range.

=== Feeding ===
The streak-capped antwren's diet is not known in detail but is mostly insects and probably includes spiders. It usually forages in pairs, though also singly or in family groups, and often though not habitually as part of a mixed-species feeding flock. It feeds mostly from about 6 m (20 ft) above the ground to the canopy though sometimes goes all the way to the ground. It actively and restlessly gleans its prey in dense vegetation, from leaves, vine tangles, and mats of vegetation in bamboo stands. It gleans mostly while perched or with short lunges. It sometimes makes short sallies to hover-glean. It is not known to follow army ant swarms.

=== Breeding ===
Only one streak-capped antwren nest is known. It was found in October; it was a small cup or bag hung from a fork at the end of a small branch about 5 m (20 ft) above the ground. An adult was seen carrying food into it. The clutch size, incubation period, time to fledging, and other details of parental care are not known.

=== Vocalization ===
The streak-capped antwren's song is a "high, sharp, ringing rattle, like 'trrrrr' " that lasts about three seconds. Its calls include a "sharp 'chip' and slightly longer, lower-pitched downslurred note"; both can delivered singly or in short bursts, and are sometimes both alternated in a longer series.

== Status ==
The IUCN originally in 1988 assessed the streak-capped antwren as Near Threatened but since 2004 has rated it as being of Least Concern. It has a large range; its population size is not known and is believed to be decreasing. No immediate threats have been identified. It is considered fairly common across its range and occurs in several protected areas.
