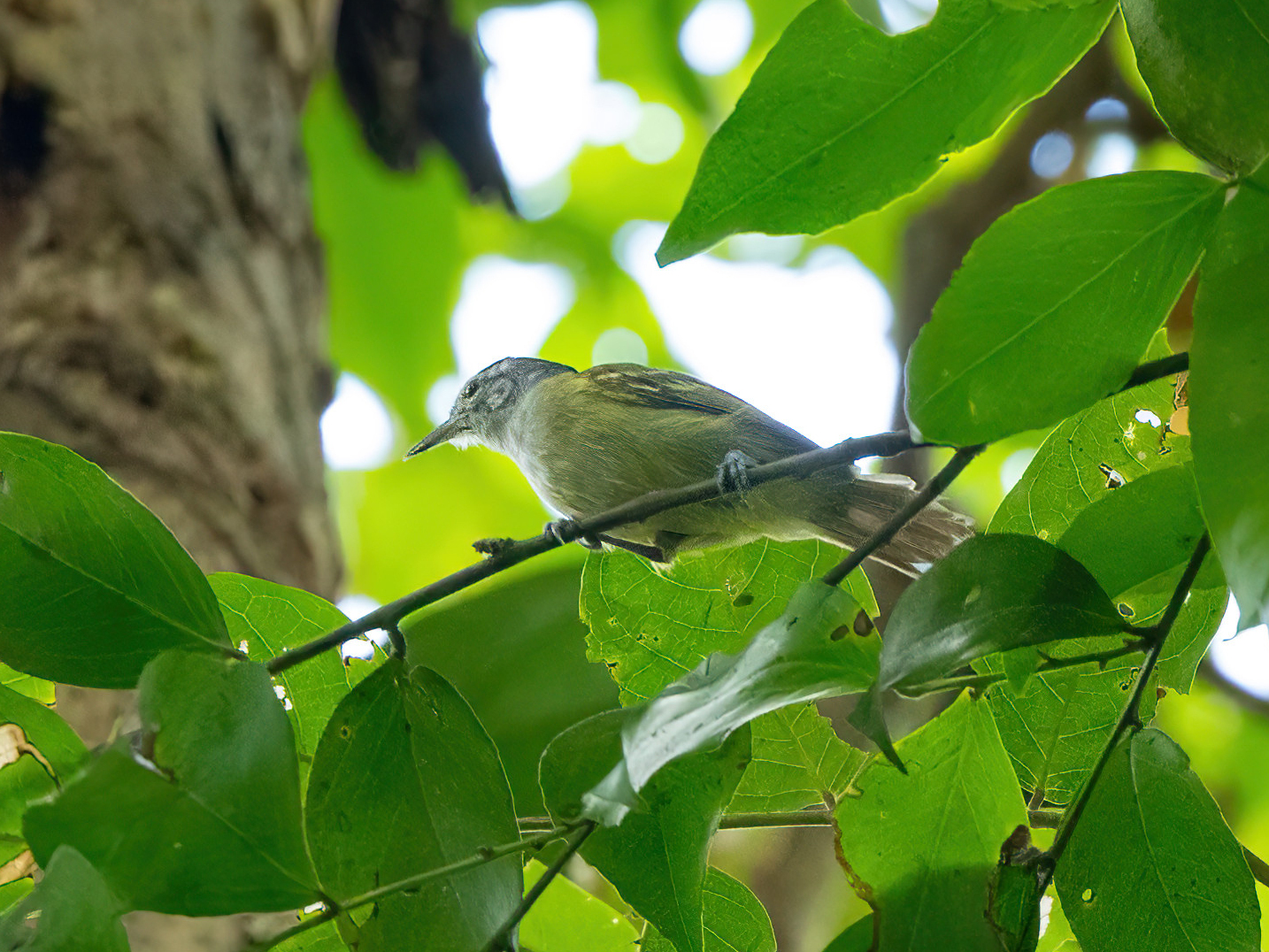

Conservation status
- Least Concern (IUCN 3.1)

Scientific classification
- Kingdom: Animalia
- Phylum: Chordata
- Class: Aves
- Order: Passeriformes
- Family: Thamnophilidae
- Genus: Euchrepomis
- Species: E. humeralis

Binomial name
- Euchrepomis humeralis (Sclater, PL & Salvin, 1880)

Synonyms
- Terenura humeralis

Audio

= Chestnut-shouldered antwren =

Species of bird

The chestnut-shouldered antwren (Euchrepomis humeralis) is a species of bird in subfamily Euchrepomidinae of family Thamnophilidae, the "typical antbirds". It is found in Bolivia, Brazil, Ecuador, and Peru.

== Taxonomy and systematics ==
The chestnut-shouldered antwren was described by the English ornithologists Philip Sclater and Osbert Salvin in 1880 and given the binomial name Terenura humeralis. There it remained until the current genus Euchrepomis was created in 2012 following phylogenetic analysis.

The chestnut-shouldered antwren is monotypic.

== Description ==
The chestnut-shouldered antwren is 9.5 to 11 cm (3.7 to 4.3 in) long and weighs about 7 to 8 g (0.25 to 0.28 oz). The sexes have different plumage. Adult males have a whitish supercilium and a thin dark line through the eye on an otherwise pale gray face. Their crown and nape are black, their back greenish olive, their rump rufous-chestnut, and their uppertail coverts and tail grayish olive. Their wing coverts are blackish gray with whitish tips that form two bars on the closed wing, their flight feathers olive-tinged blackish gray with pale olive-yellow edges, and the bend of the wing rufous-chestnut. Their throat and breast are pale gray and their belly and undertail coverts are pale yellow. Adult females have an olive-brown crown, nape and eyeline, a pale gray supercilium, and dark olive-brown wings with at most a trace of chestnut at the bend.

== Distribution and habitat ==
The chestnut-shouldered antwren is found from eastern Ecuador and eastern Peru south of the Rio Napo south into northwestern Bolivia and east in Brazil through northern Rondônia and into Amazonas state as far as the Rio Madeira. It inhabits the subcanopy and canopy of terra firme and drier floodplain tropical evergreen forest.

== Behavior ==
=== Movement ===
The chestnut-shouldered antwren is believed to be a year-round resident throughout its range.

=== Feeding ===
The chestnut-shouldered antwren feeds on arthropods, though details of its diet are lacking. It typically forages in pairs or small family groups that usually join mixed-species feeding flocks. It forages almost entirely in the forest canopy, acrobatically gleaning prey from leaves and the ends of branches.

=== Breeding ===
Nothing is known about the chestnut-shouldered antwren's breeding biology.

=== Vocalization ===
The chestnut-shouldered antwren's song is "very high, thin, slightly descending, gradually accelerating to a 'fuh-fuh-weet-weet-d-rrr' rattle".

== Status ==
The IUCN has assessed the chestnut-shouldered antwren as being of Least Concern. It has a very large range but its population size is not known and is believed to be decreasing. No immediate threats have been identified. It is considered fairly common in most of its range and occurs in several protected areas.
