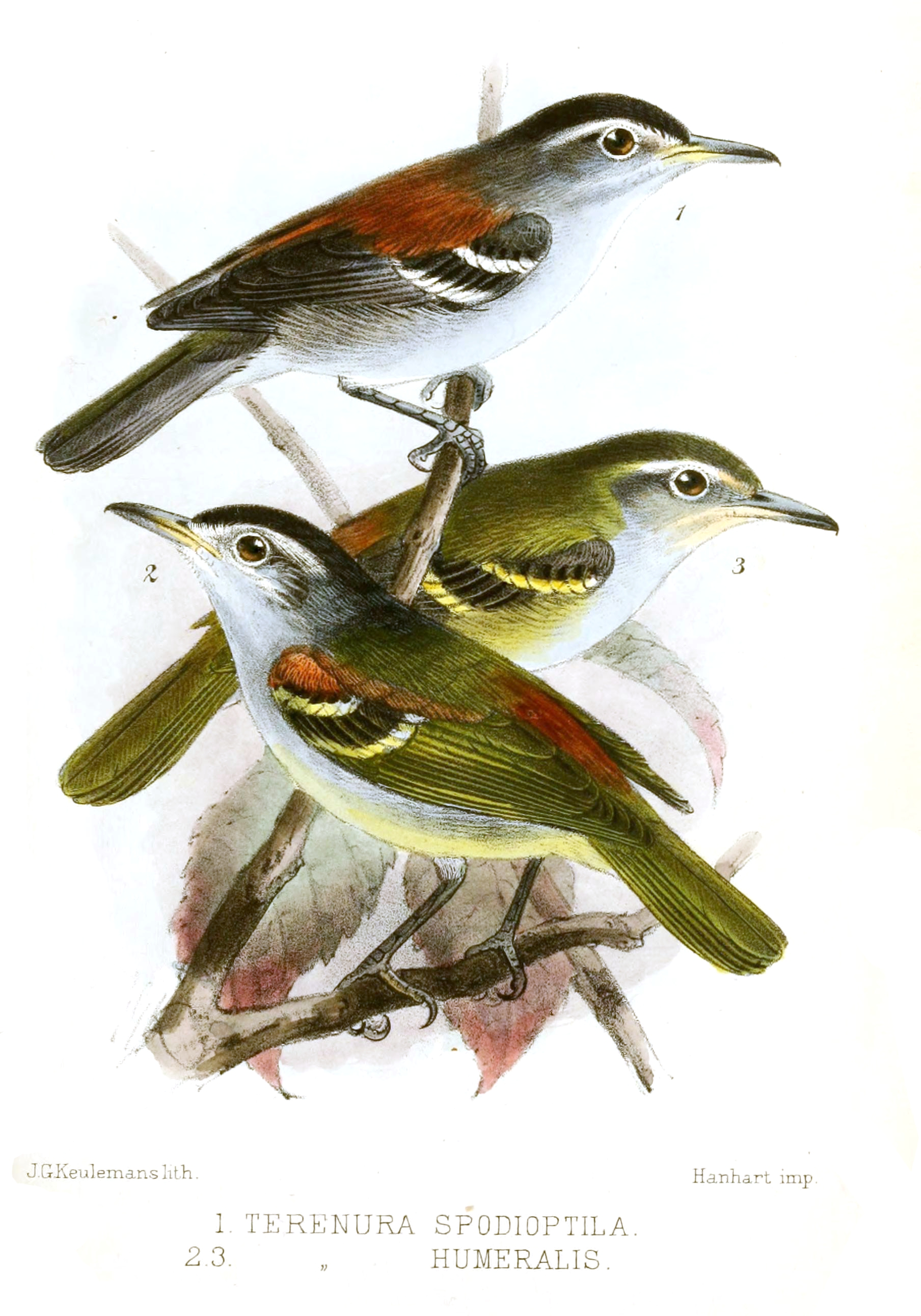
- E. spodioptila and E. humeralis

Scientific classification
- Domain: Eukaryota
- Kingdom: Animalia
- Phylum: Chordata
- Class: Aves
- Order: Passeriformes
- Family: Thamnophilidae
- Genus: Euchrepomis; Bravo et al., 2012

= Euchrepomis =

Genus of birds

Euchrepomis is a genus of insectivorous passerine birds in the antbird family, Thamnophilidae.

In 2012 Gustavo Bravo and colleagues introduced the genus Euchrepomis for four species that were previously placed in the genus Terenura. The name of the genus combines the Ancient Greek words euchrōs for "ruddy" or "bright-coloured" and epōmis for the "point of the shoulder". Male birds in the genus have a characteristic patch of yellow or rufous-orange feathers on their secondary coverts. The type species is the rufous-rumped antwren. The four species are:

- Rufous-rumped antwren (Euchrepomis callinota)
- Chestnut-shouldered antwren (Euchrepomis humeralis)
- Yellow-rumped antwren (Euchrepomis sharpei)
- Ash-winged antwren (Euchrepomis spodioptila)
