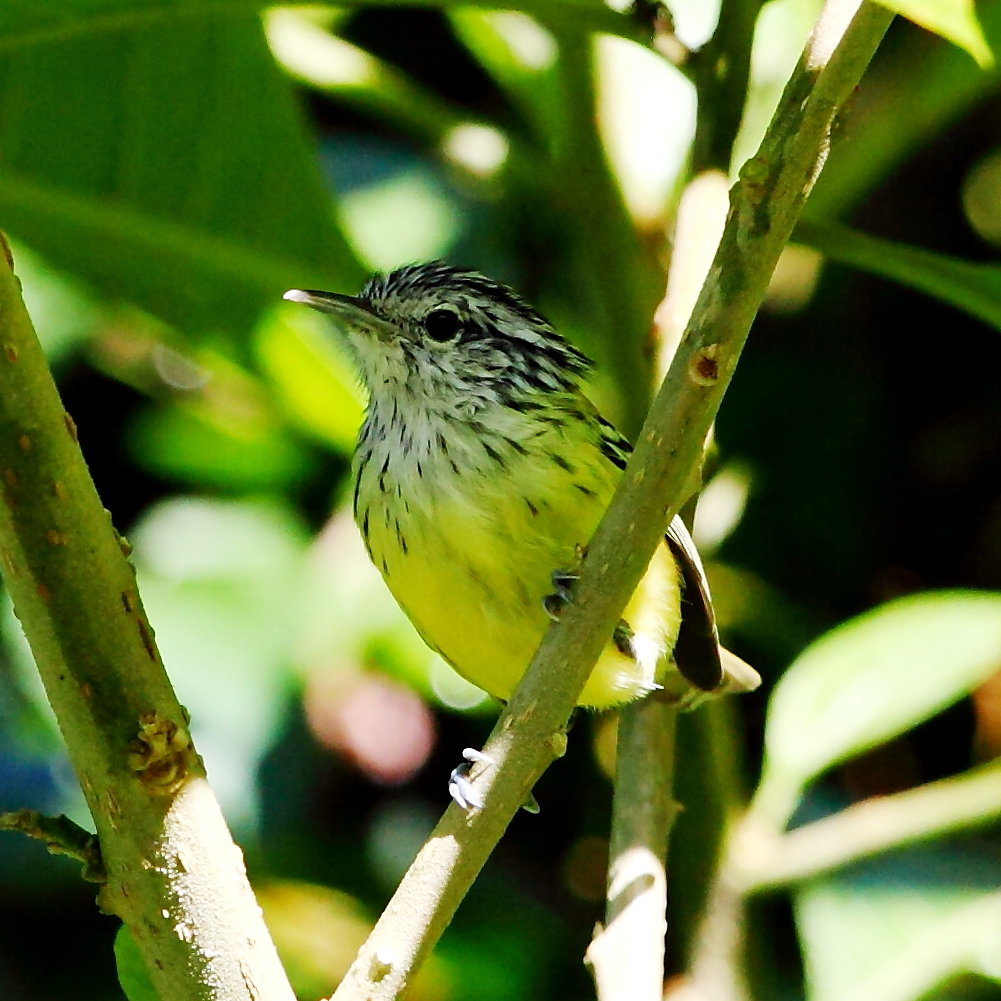
- Streak-capped antwren (Terenura maculata)

Scientific classification
- Domain: Eukaryota
- Kingdom: Animalia
- Phylum: Chordata
- Class: Aves
- Order: Passeriformes
- Family: Thamnophilidae
- Genus: Terenura; Cabanis & Heine, 1860

Type species
- Myiothera maculata zu Wied-Neuwied, 1831

= Terenura =

Genus of birds

Terenura is a genus of insectivorous passerine birds in the antbird family, Thamnophilidae.

The genus was erected by the German ornithologists Jean Cabanis and Ferdinand Heine in 1860 with the streak-capped antwren as the type species. The name of the genus comes from the Ancient Greek words terēn for "soft" and oura for "tail".

The genus contains two species:

- Streak-capped antwren (Terenura maculata)
- Orange-bellied antwren (Terenura sicki)

The genus formerly included an additional four species but these were moved to the newly erected genus Euchrepomis based on the results of a genetic study published in 2012.
