= List of antbird genera =

The antbirds are a large family, Thamnophilidae, of smallish passerine bird species of subtropical and tropical Central and South America. The family has more than 230 species divided into 63 genera and includes the antshrikes, antwrens, antvireos, fire-eyes, bare-eyes and bushbirds. The most closely related species to the antbirds are the gnateaters (family Conopophagidae) and the crescentchests (family Melanopareiidae).

== List and classification of genera ==
The list of genera below follows the World Bird List maintained by Frank Gill, David Donsker and Pamela Rasmussen on behalf of the International Ornithologists' Union. The division of the genera into subfamilies and tribes follows the phylogeny published by Jan Ohlson and colleagues in 2013 as well as the list maintained by Joseph del Hoyo on the Handbook of the Birds of the World Alive website. For more detail, see list of antbird species.

=== Subfamily Euchrepomidinae ===
- Genus Euchrepomis – antwrens (4 species)

=== Subfamily Myrmornithinae ===
- Genus Myrmornis – wing-banded antbird
- Genus Pygiptila – spot-winged antshrike
- Genus Thamnistes – antshrikes (2 species)

=== Subfamily Thamnophilinae ===
Tribe Microrhopiini

- Genus Microrhopias – dot-winged antwren
- Genus Neoctantes – black bushbird
- Genus Clytoctantes – bushbirds (2 species) (Placement here is provisional)
- Genus Epinecrophylla – stipplethroats (8 species)
- Genus Myrmorchilus – stripe-backed antbird
- Genus Aprositornis – Yapacana antbird
- Genus Ammonastes – grey-bellied antbird
- Genus Myrmophylax – black-throated antbird

Tribe Formicivorini

- Genus Myrmotherula – antwrens (24 species)
- Genus Terenura – antwrens (2 species)
- Genus Myrmochanes – black-and-white antbird
- Genus Formicivora – antwrens (9 species)

Tribe Thamnophilini

- Genus Dichrozona – banded antbird
- Genus Rhopias – star-throated antwren
- Genus Isleria – antwrens (2 species)
- Genus Thamnomanes – antshrikes (4 species)
- Genus Megastictus – pearly antshrike
- Genus Sakesphoroides - silvery-cheeked antshrike
- Genus Herpsilochmus – wren-like antshrikes (16 species)
- Genus Dysithamnus – antvireos (8 species)
- Genus Thamnophilus – antshrikes (30 species)

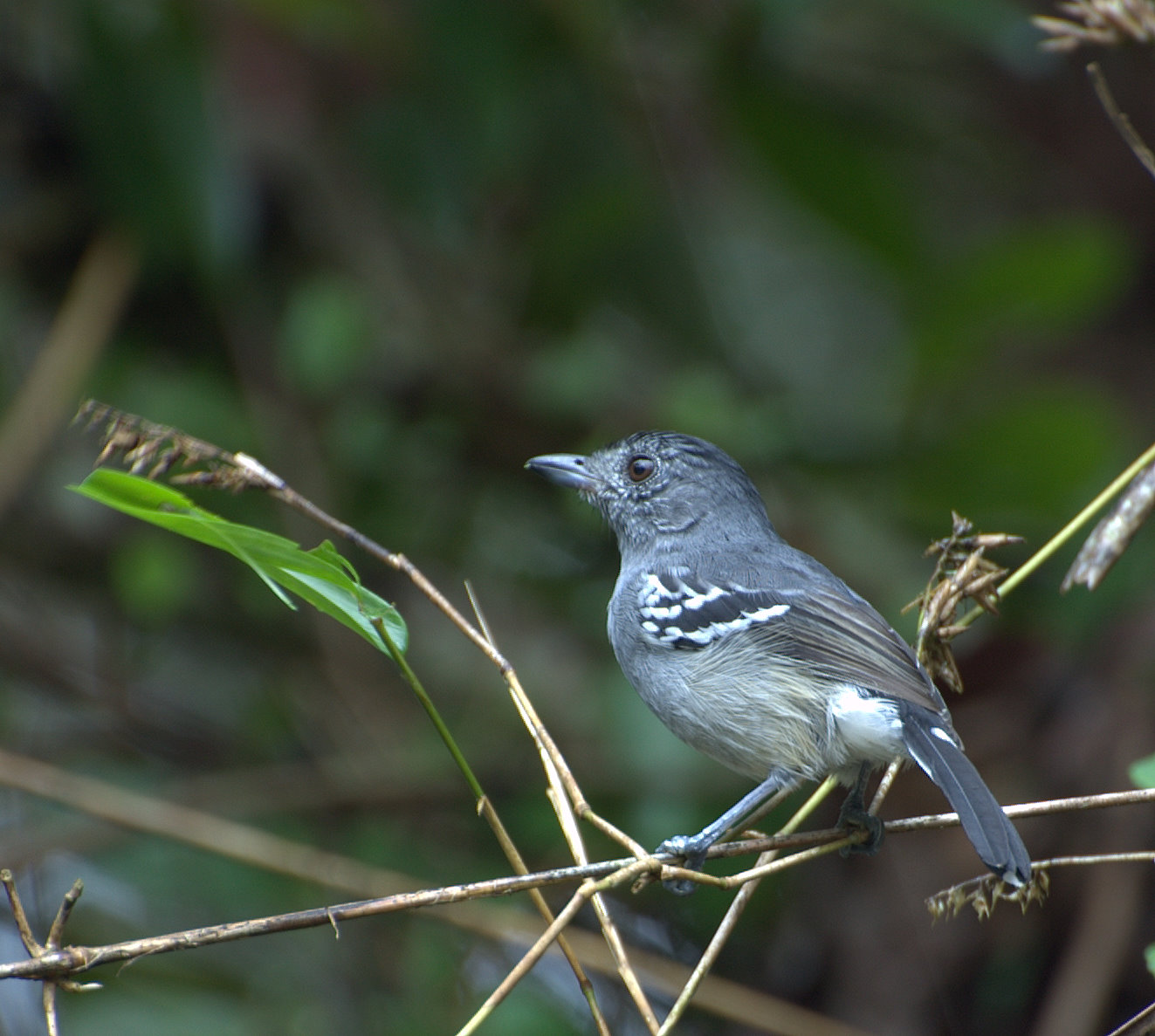
Variable antshrike

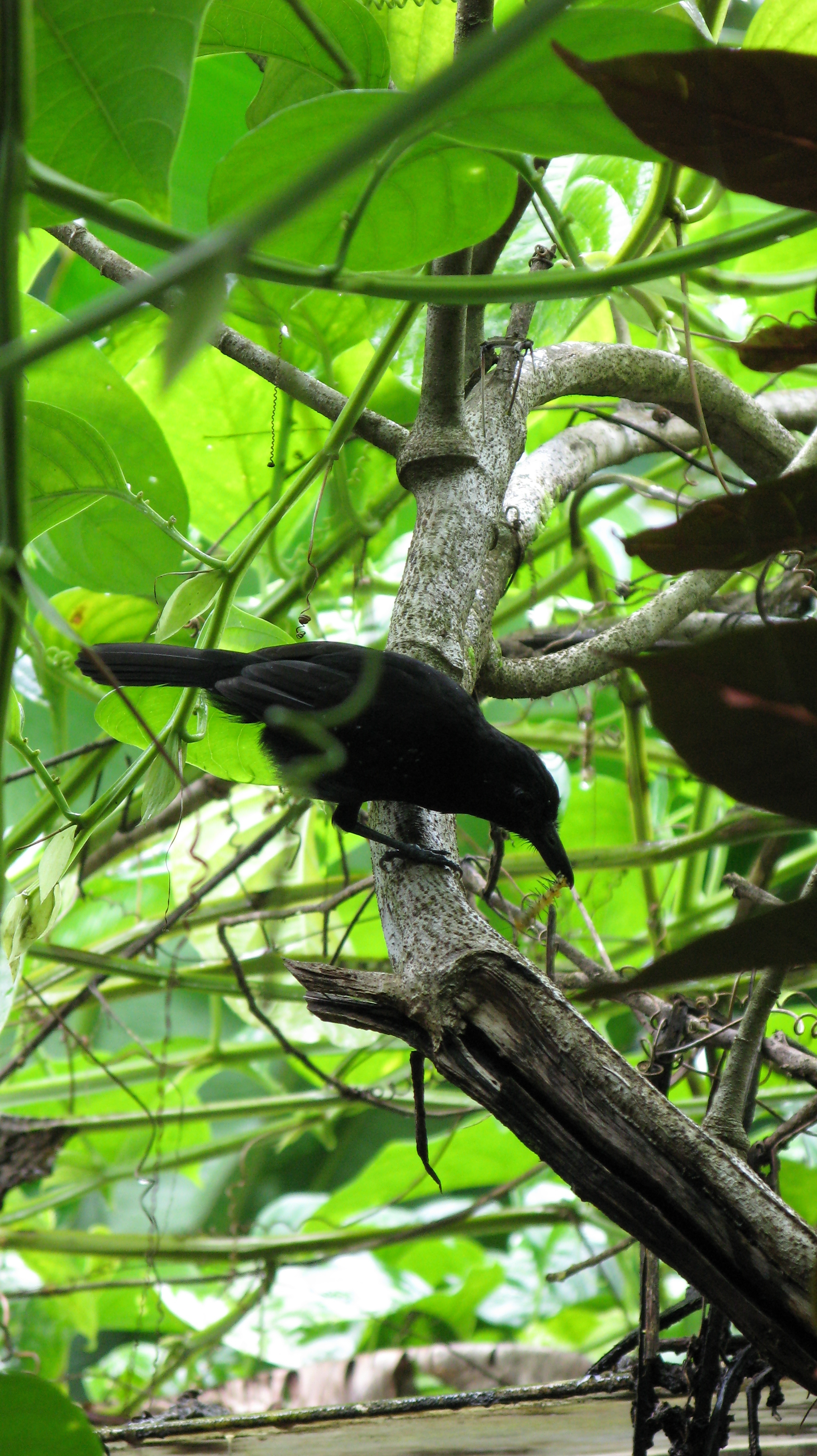
Male black-hooded antshrike

- Genus Sakesphorus – antshrikes (2 species)
- Genus Radinopsyche – Caatinga antwren
- Genus Biatas – white-bearded antshrike (Placement here is provisional)
- Genus Cymbilaimus – antshrikes (2 species)
- Genus Taraba – great antshrike
- Genus Mackenziaena – antshrikes (2 species)
- Genus Frederickena – antshrikes (3 species)
- Genus Hypoedaleus – spot-backed antshrike
- Genus Batara – giant antshrike
- Genus Xenornis – speckled antshrike (Placement here is provisional)

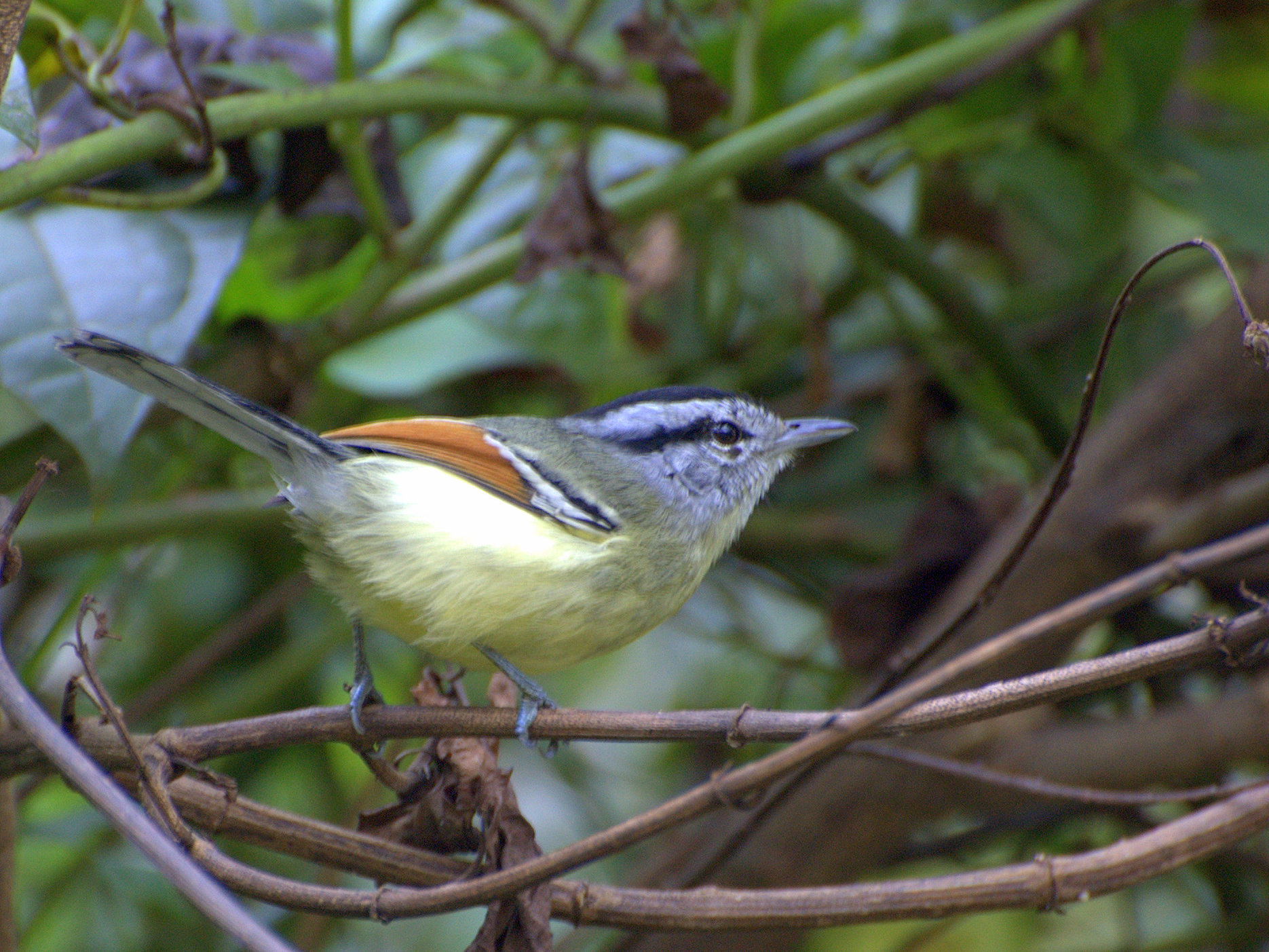
Rufous-margined antwren

Tribe Pithyini

- Genus Pithys (2 species)
- Genus Phaenostictus – ocellated antbird
- Genus Gymnopithys (3 species)
- Genus Oneillornis (2 species)
- Genus Rhegmatorhina (5 species)
- Genus Phlegopsis – bare-eyes (3 species)
- Genus Willisornis (2 species)
- Genus Drymophila (11 species)
- Genus Hypocnemis – warbling-antbirds (8 species)
- Genus Sciaphylax (2 species)
- Genus Cercomacroides (6 species)
- Genus Cercomacra (7 species)

Tribe Pyriglenini

- Genus Myrmoderus (5 species)
- Genus Hypocnemoides (2 species)
- Genus Hylophylax (3 species)
- Genus Sclateria – silvered antbird
- Genus Myrmelastes (8 species)
- Genus Poliocrania – chestnut-backed antbird
- Genus Ampelornis – grey-headed antbird
- Genus Sipia (4 species)
- Genus Myrmeciza – white-bellied antbird
- Genus Myrmoborus (5 species)
- Genus Gymnocichla – bare-crowned antbird
- Genus Pyriglena – fire-eyes (5 species)
- Genus Rhopornis – slender antbird (Placement here is provisional)
- Genus Percnostola (2 species)
- Genus Akletos (2 species)
- Genus Hafferia (3 species)

== Phylogeny ==
Phylogeny based on a study of the suboscines by Michael Harvey and colleagues published in 2020. Seven genera in the antbird family were found to be paraphyletic: Clytoctantes, Drymophila, Dysithamnus, Formicivora, Herpsilochmus, Myrmotherula and Sakesphorus.

- Thamnophilidae
  - - Myrmornis – wing-banded antbird
    - - Pygiptila – spot-winged antshrike
      - Thamnistes – antshrikes (2 species)
  - - - Euchrepomis – antwrens (4 species)
      - - Microrhopiini
          - - Myrmorchilus – stripe-backed antbird
            - - Microrhopias – dot-winged antwren
              - - Aprositornis – Yapacana antbird
                - - Ammonastes – grey-bellied antbird
                  - Myrmophylax – black-throated antbird
          - - - Clytoctantes alixii – recurve-billed bushbird
              - - Clytoctantes atrogularis – Rondônia bushbird
                - Neoctantes – black bushbird
            - Epinecrophylla – stipplethroats (8 species)
        - - Formicivorini
            - - Myrmotherula (streaked group) and Myrmochanes
              - Terenura – antwrens (2 species)
            - - Myrmotherula (grey group)
              - - Formicivora – antwrens (8 species)
                - - Formicivora iheringi – narrow-billed antwren
                  - - Myrmotherula fluminensis – Rio de Janeiro antwren
                    - Myrmotherula iheringi – Ihering's antwren
          - - Thamnophilini
              - - Isleria – antwrens (2 species)
                - - Thamnomanes – antshrikes (4 species)
                  - Xenornis – speckled antshrike
              - - Megastictus – pearly antshrike
                - - - Dichrozona – banded antbird
                    - Rhopias – star-throated antwren
                  - - - Cymbilaimus – antshrikes (2 species)
                      - - Taraba – great antshrike
                        - - - Batara – giant antshrike
                            - Hypoedaleus – spot-backed antshrike
                          - - Frederickena – antshrikes (3 species)
                            - Mackenziaena – antshrikes (2 species)
                    - - - Sakesphorus – antshrikes (2 species)
                        - Thamnophilus – antshrikes (30 species)
                      - - Sakesphoroides – silvery-cheeked antshrike
                        - - - Biatas – white-bearded antshrike
                            - Radinopsyche – Caatinga antwren
                          - - - Dysithamnus – antvireos (6 species)
                              - Herpsilochmus – antwrens (17 species)
                            - - Dysithamnus puncticeps – spot-crowned antvireo
                              - Dysithamnus striaticeps – streak-crowned antvireo
            - - Pithyini
                - - Cercomacra (7 species)
                  - - Cercomacroides (6 species)
                    - - Sciaphylax (2 species)
                      - - Drymophila squamata – scaled antbird
                        - - Drymophila (10 species)
                          - Hypocnemis – warbling-antbirds (8 species)
                - - - Phaenostictus – ocellated antbird
                    - Pithys (2 species)
                  - - Willisornis (2 species)
                    - - Phlegopsis – bare-eyes (3 species)
                      - - Oneillornis (2 species)
                        - - Gymnopithys (3 species)
                          - Rhegmatorhina (5 species)
              - Pyriglenini
                - - Poliocrania – chestnut-backed antbird
                  - - Ampelornis – grey-headed antbird
                    - Sipia (4 species)
                - - - Myrmoderus (5 species)
                    - - Hylophylax (3 species)
                      - Hypocnemoides (2 species)
                  - - - Myrmelastes (8 species)
                      - Sclateria – silvered antbird
                    - - Myrmeciza – white-bellied antbird
                      - - Rhopornis – slender antbird
                        - - Myrmoborus (5 species)
                          - - Pyriglena – fire-eyes (3 species)
                            - - - Akletos (2 species)
                                - Gymnocichla– bare-crowned antbird
                              - - Hafferia (3 species)
                                - Percnostola (2 species)
