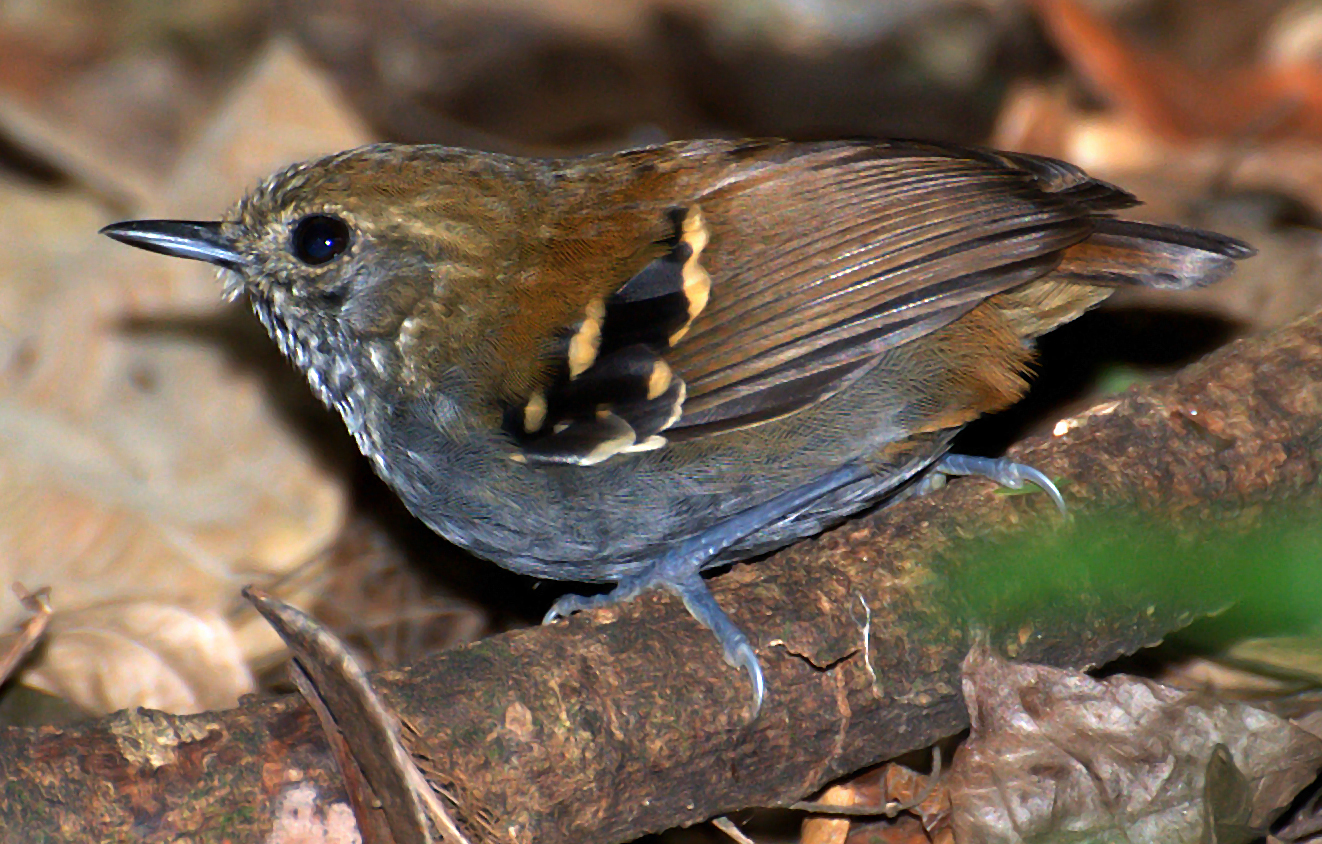

Conservation status
- Least Concern (IUCN 3.1)

Scientific classification
- Kingdom: Animalia
- Phylum: Chordata
- Class: Aves
- Order: Passeriformes
- Family: Thamnophilidae
- Genus: Rhopias; Cabanis & Heine, 1860
- Species: R. gularis

Binomial name
- Rhopias gularis (von Spix, 1825)

Synonyms
- Myrmotherula gularis

= Star-throated antwren =

Species of bird

The star-throated antwren (Rhopias gularis) is an insectivorous bird in subfamily Thamnophilinae of family Thamnophilidae, the "typical antbirds". It is endemic to southeastern Brazil.

== Taxonomy and systematics ==
The star-throated antwren was described and illustrated by the German naturalist Johann Baptist von Spix in 1825 and given the binomial name Thamnophilus gularis. It was subsequently placed with the "stipple-throated group" in the genus Myrmotherula, a group which later was itself transferred to genus Epinecrophylla. When a morphological and genetic analysis published in 2012 found that the star-throated antwren was not closely related to other species in Myrmotherula it was moved to genus Rhopias which had originally been erected by the German ornithologists Jean Cabanis and Ferdinand Heine in 1860. The type species is the star-throated antwren. The name of the genus comes from the Ancient Greek word rhōps meaning "bush".

The star-throated antwren is the only member of genus Rhopias and it has no subspecies. Its closest relatives appear to be the banded antbird (Dichrozona cincta) and the two species of antwrens in genus Isleria.

== Description ==
The star-throated antwren is 8.5 to 9.5 cm (3.3 to 3.7 in) long and weighs 10 to 12 g (0.35 to 0.42 oz). Adult males have a grayish forehead and rufous-brown crown, upperparts, and tail with a hidden white patch between the scapulars. Their wings are mostly rufous-brown with white at the bend and blackish brown coverts dotted with pale cinnamon. Their throat is black with white spots, their breast and belly gray, and their flanks and undertail coverts pale rufous-brown. Females have a buffy forehead, larger white throat spots than males, and no white patch between the scapulars.

== Distribution and habitat ==
The star-throated antwren is found in coastal southeastern Brazil from southeastern Bahia south into northeastern Rio Grande do Sul and inland to western Paraná. It inhabits the understorey of evergreen forest. It favors dense vegetation along streams in the lowlands and in shady ravines in the foothills. In elevation it mostly occurs between 300 and 1,550 m (1,000 and 5,100 ft) but does occur down to sea level.

== Behavior ==
=== Movement ===
The star-throated antwren is believed to be a year-round resident throughout its range.

=== Feeding ===
The star-throated antwren's diet has not been detailed but is known to include insects and spiders. It mostly forages singly or in pairs, and sometimes joins mixed-species feeding flocks. It typically forages from the ground up to about 5 m (15 ft) above it but will feed as high as 8 m (25 ft). It actively gleans from leaves and stems by reaching from a perch and making short jumps. It also jumps from a perch to take prey from leaf litter the ground and works through tangles of fallen branches. There is one record of a pair following an army ant swarm.

=== Breeding ===
The star-throated antwren's breeding season has not been fully defined but includes October to January. Its nest is an open cup made of fine rootlets, fungal fibers, and pieces of dried leaves. It is typically suspended from a slender horizontal stem or a fork between 0.6 and 1 m (2 and 3 ft) above the ground and often over or near watercourses. The clutch is two eggs. These have a white background covered with reddish-brown spots and blotches. The average size of an egg is 19.0 mm × 14.5 mm (0.75 in × 0.57 in) with a weight of 2.2 g (0.078 oz). The inclubation period is about 17 days and fledging occurs about 11 days after hatch. Both parents incubate the clutch and provision the nestlings.

=== Vocalization ===
The star-throated antwren's song is an "extr. high, slightly lowered 'tzew-tzew--' " repeated about six times. One call is a "low 'tzeet-tzeet' ".

== Status ==
The IUCN has assessed the star-throated antwren as being of Least Concern. It has a fairly large range. Its population size is not known and is believed to be decreasing. No immediate threats have been identified. It is considered generally uncommon. It occurs in several nominally protected areas but "the deforestation, colonization, agricultural expansion and urbanization that inevitably follow an expanding human population in this already most densely populated region of Brazil will present continuing threats to the integrity of the reserves on which this and many other endemic species depend".
