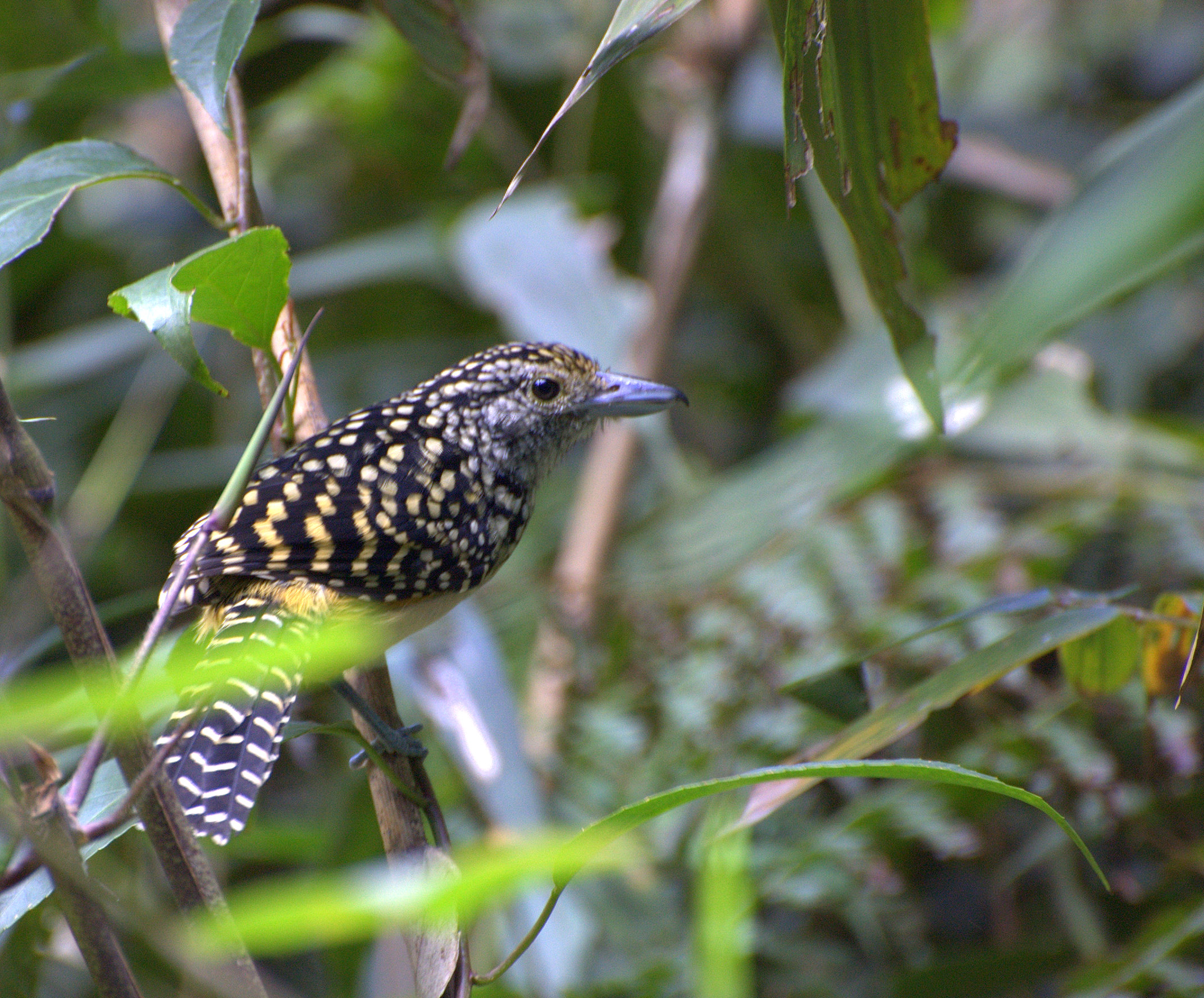

Conservation status
- Least Concern (IUCN 3.1)

Scientific classification
- Kingdom: Animalia
- Phylum: Chordata
- Class: Aves
- Order: Passeriformes
- Family: Thamnophilidae
- Genus: Hypoedaleus; Cabanis & Heine, 1860
- Species: H. guttatus

Binomial name
- Hypoedaleus guttatus (Vieillot, 1816)

= Spot-backed antshrike =

Species of bird

The spot-backed antshrike (Hypoedaleus guttatus) is a species of bird in subfamily Thamnophilinae of family Thamnophilidae, the "typical antbirds". It is found in Argentina, Brazil, and Paraguay.

== Taxonomy and systematics ==
The spot-backed antshrike was described by the French ornithologist Louis Pierre Vieillot in 1816 and given the binomial name Thamnophilus guttatus. The genus Hypoedaleus was erected by the German ornithologists Jean Cabanis and Ferdinand Heine in 1860 with the spot-backed antshrike as the type species. The name of the genus is from the Ancient Greek hupoidaleos meaning "somewhat swollen". The specific epithet is from the Latin guttatus meaning "spotted" or "speckled".

The spot-backed antshrike is the only member of genus Hypoedaleus and it has no subspecies.

== Description ==
The spot-backed antshrike is a large antbird, 20 to 21 cm (7.9 to 8.3 in) long. The species exhibits slight sexual dimorphism. Both sexes have a short, heavy, gray bill with a hook at the end like true shrikes. Adult males have a black crown, nape, and upperparts spotted with white and a brownish black tail with white bars. Their throat and breast are white and their sides pale gray. Their belly and crissum are nearly white in the northern part of their range and gradually darken to brownish yellow to the south. Adult females have a similar pattern as males, but with buff spots on their upperparts and more extensive brownish yellow on their underparts.

== Distribution and habitat ==
The spot-backed antshrike is found from eastern Alagoas in eastern Brazil south to northern Rio Grande do Sul and southwest through eastern Paraguay and into northeastern Argentina's Misiones Province. It is a bird of the Atlantic Forest, where it inhabits the subcanopy and canopy of lowland evergreen forest. It almost exclusively stays in wetter areas with dense vines and other vegetation. In elevation it ranges from sea level to about 900 m (3,000 ft).

== Behavior ==
=== Movement ===
The spot-backed antshrike is presumed to be a year-round resident throughout its range.

=== Feeding ===
The spot-backed antshrike feeds on a variety of insects and other arthropods; its diet also includes snails and possibly small vertebrates like tree-frogs and lizards. It usually forages in pairs, mostly about between 8 and 15 m (25 and 50 ft) above the ground, and sometimes joins mixed-species feeding flocks. It hops sluggishly through dense vines and other vegetation, reaching from a perch to glean prey from leaves, especially those of bromeliads and epiphytic ferns, and also from stems and branches. It was once observed following an army ant swarm, staying low to the ground to capture prey disturbed by the ants.

=== Breeding ===
The spot-backed antshrike's eggs are white with lilac dots and larger blackish spots. Nothing else is known about the species' breeding biology.

=== Vocalization ===
The spot-backed antshrike's song is a "very high, slow, at first rising then descending, shivering rattle" that lasts four or five seconds. Its calls include a "long, downward-inflected whistle", a "shorter, slightly descending churr", and an "abrupt 'chip' ".

== Status ==
The IUCN originally in 1988 assessed the spot-backed antshrike as Near Threatened, then in 1994 as unknown, and since 2004 as of Least Concern. Its population size is not known and is believed to be decreasing. No immediate threats have been identified. It occurs in several protected areas but appears to be generally rare outside them. "Although not currently considered threatened, its relatively small range and the highly fragmented nature of remaining Atlantic Forest are causes for concern for this species, which seems to require large territories."
