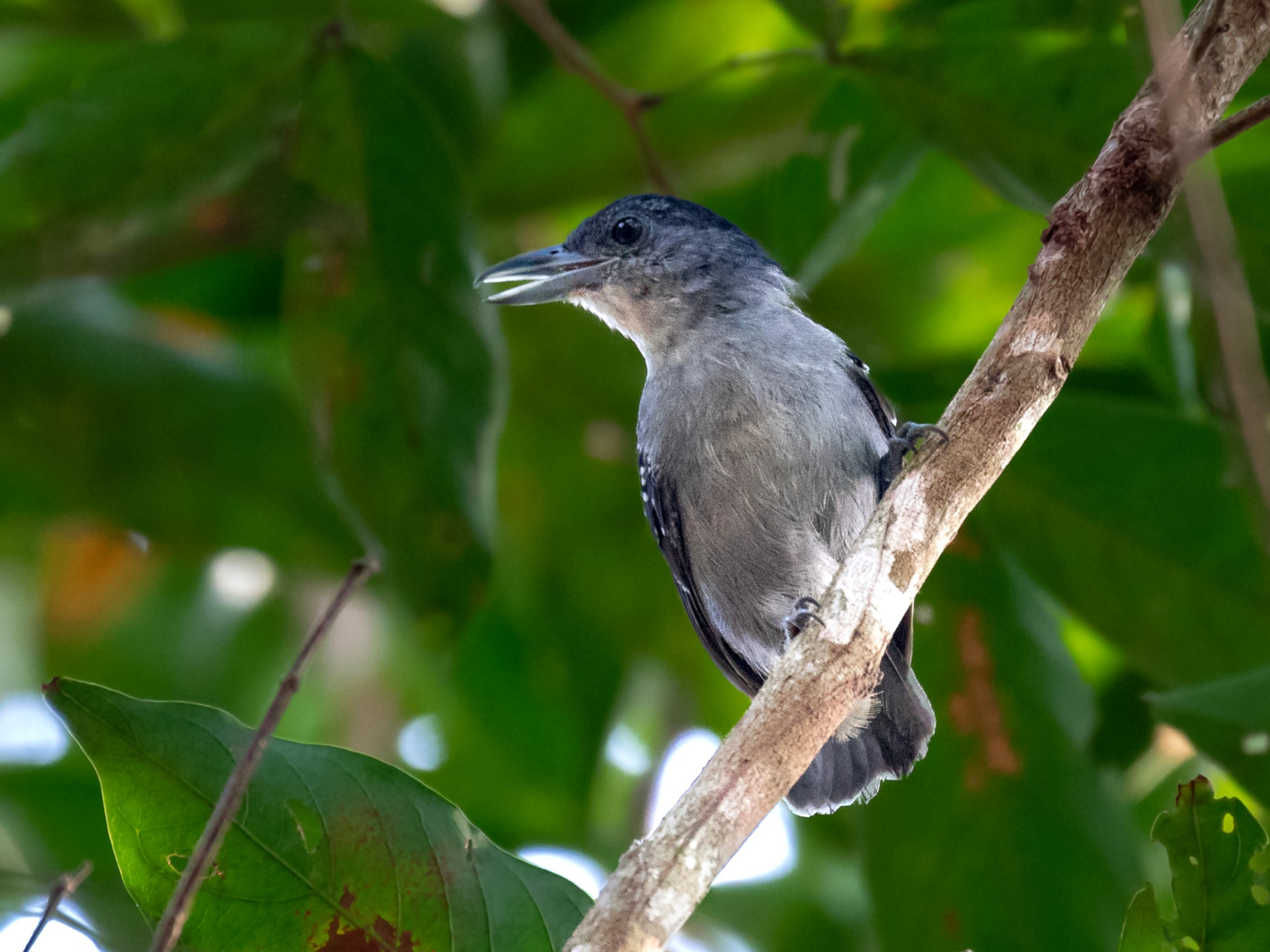
- Male

Conservation status
- Least Concern (IUCN 3.1)

Scientific classification
- Kingdom: Animalia
- Phylum: Chordata
- Class: Aves
- Order: Passeriformes
- Family: Thamnophilidae
- Genus: Pygiptila; Sclater, PL, 1858
- Species: P. stellaris

Binomial name
- Pygiptila stellaris (von Spix, 1825)

= Spot-winged antshrike =

Species of bird

The spot-winged antshrike (Pygiptila stellaris) is a species of bird in subfamily Myrmornithinae of family Thamnophilidae, the "typical antbirds". It is found in Bolivia, Brazil, Colombia, Ecuador, Guyana, Peru, Suriname, Venezuela, and possibly French Guiana.

== Taxonomy and systematics ==
The spot-winged antshrike was described and illustrated by the German naturalist Johann Baptist von Spix in 1825 and given the binomial name Thamnophilus stellaris. The current genus Pygiptila was erected by the English zoologist Philip Sclater in 1858. The spot-winged antshrike is the only member of that genus.

The further taxonomy of the spot-winged antshrike is unsettled. The International Ornithological Committee and the Clements taxonomy assign it these four subspecies:

- P. s. maculipennis (Sclater, PL, 1855)
- P. s. occipitalis Zimmer, JT, 1932
- P. s. purusiana Todd, 1927
- P. s. stellaris (von Spix, 1825)

However, BirdLife International's Handbook of the Birds of the World recognizes only two subspecies and includes P. s. maculipennis and P. s. purusiana within the nominate P. s. stellaris.

This article follows the four-subspecies model.

== Description ==
The spot-winged antshrike is 12 to 13.5 cm (4.7 to 5.3 in) long and weighs 23 to 27 g (0.81 to 0.95 oz). It has a short tail and a heavy bill. The sexes have quite different plumage. Adult males of the nominate subspecies are mostly gray that is somewhat darker on their upperside, with a black crown, scattered black feathers on their back, and white spots on their wing coverts. Adult females are gray with a clay tinge on the crown, upperparts, tertials, and tail. Their face and underparts are pale clay with a gray tinge on the flanks and undertail coverts. Their wing coverts, primaries, and secondaries are cinnamon-tawny, with no spots on the coverts. Females of subspecies P. s. maculipennis have a deeper clay tinge on their upperparts than the nominate. Males of P. s. occipitalis are somewhat darker than the nominate. P. s. purusiana is almost indistinguishable from the nominate.

== Distribution and habitat ==
The subspecies of the spot-winged antshrike are found thus:

- P. s. maculipennis: southeastern Colombia south through eastern Ecuador into central Peru
- P. s. occipitalis: extreme eastern Colombia east through northern Venezuela, Brazil north of the Amazon River, and the Guianas (but see below)
- P. s. purusiana: southeastern Peru, northern Bolivia, and west central Brazil south of the Amazon east to the Madeira River
- P. s. stellaris: Brazil south of the Amazon to northwestern Mato Grosso

The South American Classification Committee of the American Ornithological Society has reports but no documented records of the spot-winged antshrike from French Guiana and therefore treats the species as hypothetical in that country.

The spot-winged antshrike primarily inhabits lowland evergreen forest, both terra firme and seasonally flooded. It also occurs in nearby secondary forest. It is arboreal and usually remains in the forest's middle levels to its canopy. In elevation it ranges as high as 700 m (2,300 ft) in Brazil but only to 500 m (1,600 ft) in Colombia and 400 m (1,300 ft) in Ecuador.

== Behavior ==
=== Movement ===
The spot-winged antshrike is believed to be a year-round resident throughout its range.

=== Feeding ===
The spot-winged antshrike feeds mostly on arthropods though it was once observed eating a frog. It forages singly, in pairs, and in small family groups, hopping along branches and through foliage, typically between 7 and 25 m (25 and 80 ft) above the ground. It seems to favor vine tangles for feeding and also often probes and tears apart clusters of dead leaves to find prey. It often joins mixed-species feeding flocks and occasionally attends army ant swarms; at the latter it descends to near the ground.

=== Breeding ===
The spot-winged antshrike's breeding season has not been defined but appears to include September to November. Both sexes build a nest by piling leaves and plant fibers on a tangle of branches and sitting on the pile to shape it. Nothing else is known about its breeding biology.

=== Vocalization ===
The spot-winged antshrike's song is a "rather short...uncountable series of evenly spaced abrupt notes, increasing in intensity and declining slightly in pitch, immediately followed by long whistle usually rising and falling slightly in pitch". It has been rendered as "tdrrrr Tiúw" and "t-t-t-t-t-t-teéuw". Its calls include a sharp "'chet!" or "chak".

== Status ==
The IUCN has assessed the spot-winged antshrike as being of Least Concern. It has a very large range, and though its population size is not known it is believed to be stable. No immediate threats have been identified. It is considered generally common in most of its range and occurs in many protected areas. Its "[r]ange also encompasses extensive, intact habitat which, although not formally protected, is at little short-term risk of development".
