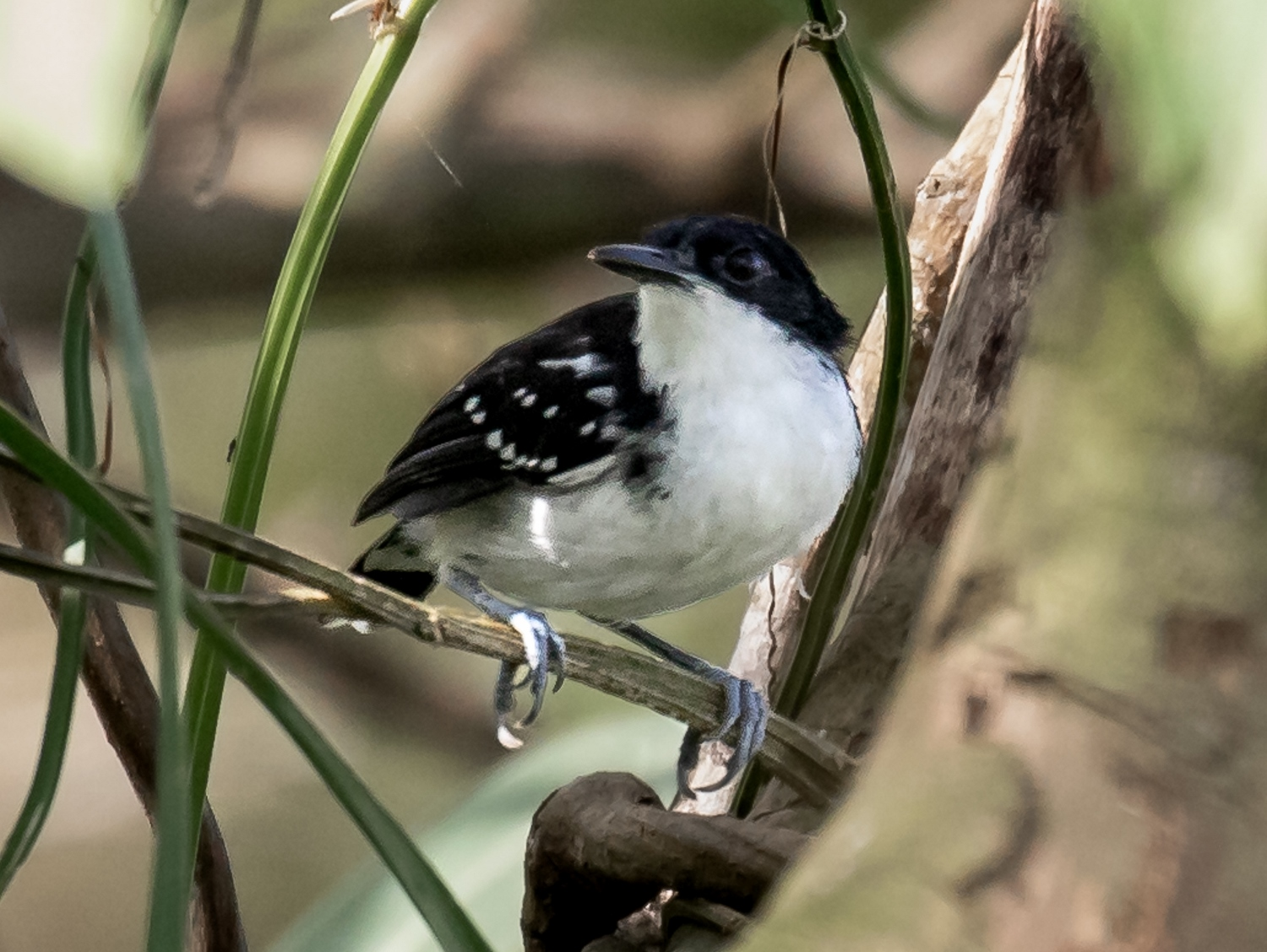
- A male at Marchantaria Island, Iranduba, Amazonas state, Brazil

Conservation status
- Least Concern (IUCN 3.1)

Scientific classification
- Kingdom: Animalia
- Phylum: Chordata
- Class: Aves
- Order: Passeriformes
- Family: Thamnophilidae
- Genus: Myrmochanes; Allen, 1889
- Species: M. hemileucus

Binomial name
- Myrmochanes hemileucus (Sclater, PL & Salvin, 1866)

= Black-and-white antbird =

Species of bird

The black-and-white antbird (Myrmochanes hemileucus) is a species of bird in subfamily Thamnophilinae of family Thamnophilidae, the "typical antbirds". It is found in Bolivia, Brazil, Colombia, Ecuador, and Peru.

== Taxonomy and systematics ==
The black-and-white antbird is the only member of genus Myrmochanes and has no subspecies.

The black-and-white antbird was first described by the English ornithologists Philip Sclater and Osbert Salvin in 1866 and given the binomial name Hypocmenis hemileucus. It was moved to genus Myrmochanes following a proposal by the American ornithologist Joel Asaph Allen in 1889. The species is included in the tribe Formicivorini along with three other genera, Formicivora, Myrmotherula, and Terenura.

== Description ==
The black-and-white antbird is 10 to 12.2 cm (3.9 to 4.8 in) long and weighs 12 to 13 g (0.42 to 0.46 oz). Adult males' face, crown, nape, and upperparts are black except for a mostly hidden white patch between the shoulders. Their wings are black with sparse white tips on the coverts. Their tail is short, somewhat graduated, and black with white tips on the feathers. Their throat and underparts are white with variable amounts of buff on the flanks and belly. Adult females resemble males with the addition of white spots on the lores and a buffier belly and undertail coverts. The species' bill is long, slender, and black, its iris brown, and its legs and feet gray.

== Distribution and habitat ==
The black-and-white antbird is found in the western Amazon Basin along the Amazon from its origin in Peru to the mouth of the Rio Madeira in Brazil, and also along its major tributaries. It occurs along the Rio Napo from northwestern Ecuador through northern Peru to its confluence with the Amazon. In Peru it also occurs along the rios Ucayali and Marañón to where their confluence creates the Amazon, and on the Amazon itself. From the south it occurs along the Rio Madeira through central Bolivia and Brazil to the Amazon. In far southern Colombia it occurs only along the Amazon where the river forms the border with Peru.

The black-and-white antbird is found almost exclusively on river islands, though it has been observed in agricultural plots on the mainland. It favors young to middle-aged islands with Tessaria scrub and vine tangles in the understory of tall Cecropia forest.

== Behavior ==
=== Movement ===
The black-and-white antbird is essentially a year-round resident throughout its range, but during the wet season when many islands are flooded it probably makes short-distance movements to larger islands or the mainland.

=== Feeding ===
The diet of the black-and-white antbirds is not known in detail but includes insects and probably spiders. It typically forages in pairs or family groups, less often singly, and never as part of a mixed-species feeding flock. It mostly forages in vine tangles and other vegetation in the understory of Cecropia woods, and usually between about 1 and 4 m (3 and 13 ft) of the ground but occasionally as high as 8 m (26 ft). It takes most of its prey by gleaning from leaves, bark, and grass blades. It forages very actively, often by lunging after prey, and sometimes makes short sallies from a perch.

=== Breeding ===
Nothing is known about the black-and-white antbird's breeding biology.

=== Vocalization ===
The black-and-white antbird's song is "an accelerating, descending, series of hollow, piping notes: PU-pu-pu'pu'puprrrrr" that is often sung as a duet with the female's voice being higher pitched. Its calls include "a series of hollow piping notes pu pu pu, also a more rapid musical rattle (similar to end of song), sometimes in series, also a single peu and a bisyllabic tuk-et"

== Status ==
The IUCN has assessed the black-and-white antbird as being of Least Concern. It has a large range; its population size is not known but is believed to be stable. No immediate threats have been identified. It is considered locally not uncommon to fairly common. "Human activity has little short-term direct effect on the Black-and-white Antbird, other than the local effects of habitat destruction, [however it] potentially is vulnerable to widespread habitat loss, as might occur through perturbations of the Amazonian hydrological regime stemming from widespread deforestation, dam construction, or global climate change." One study predicts that the species will lose at least 50% of its habitat within Brazil due to infrastructure development.
