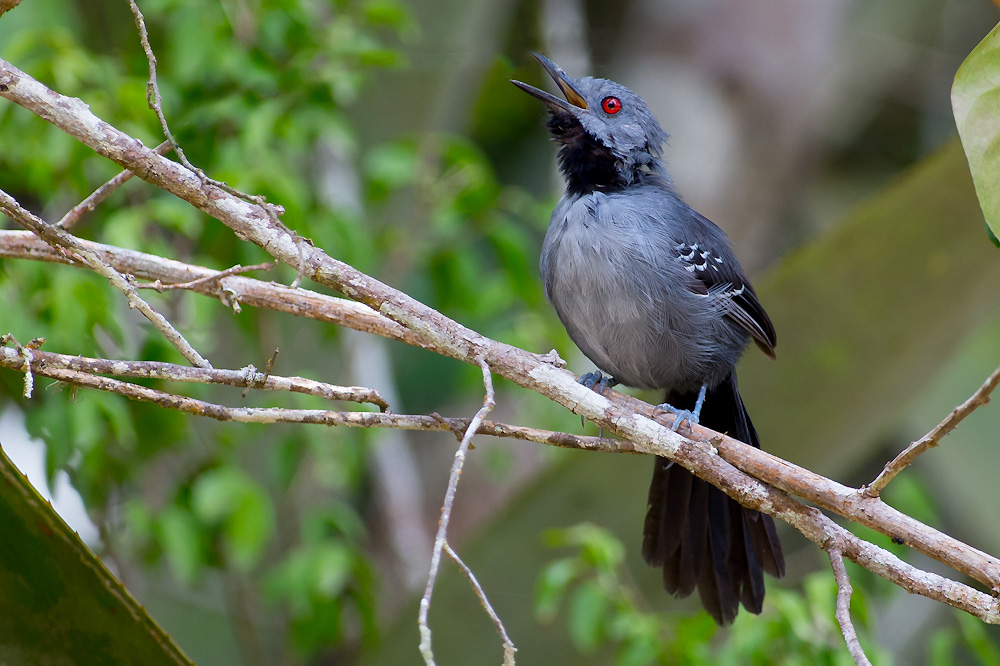
- Male
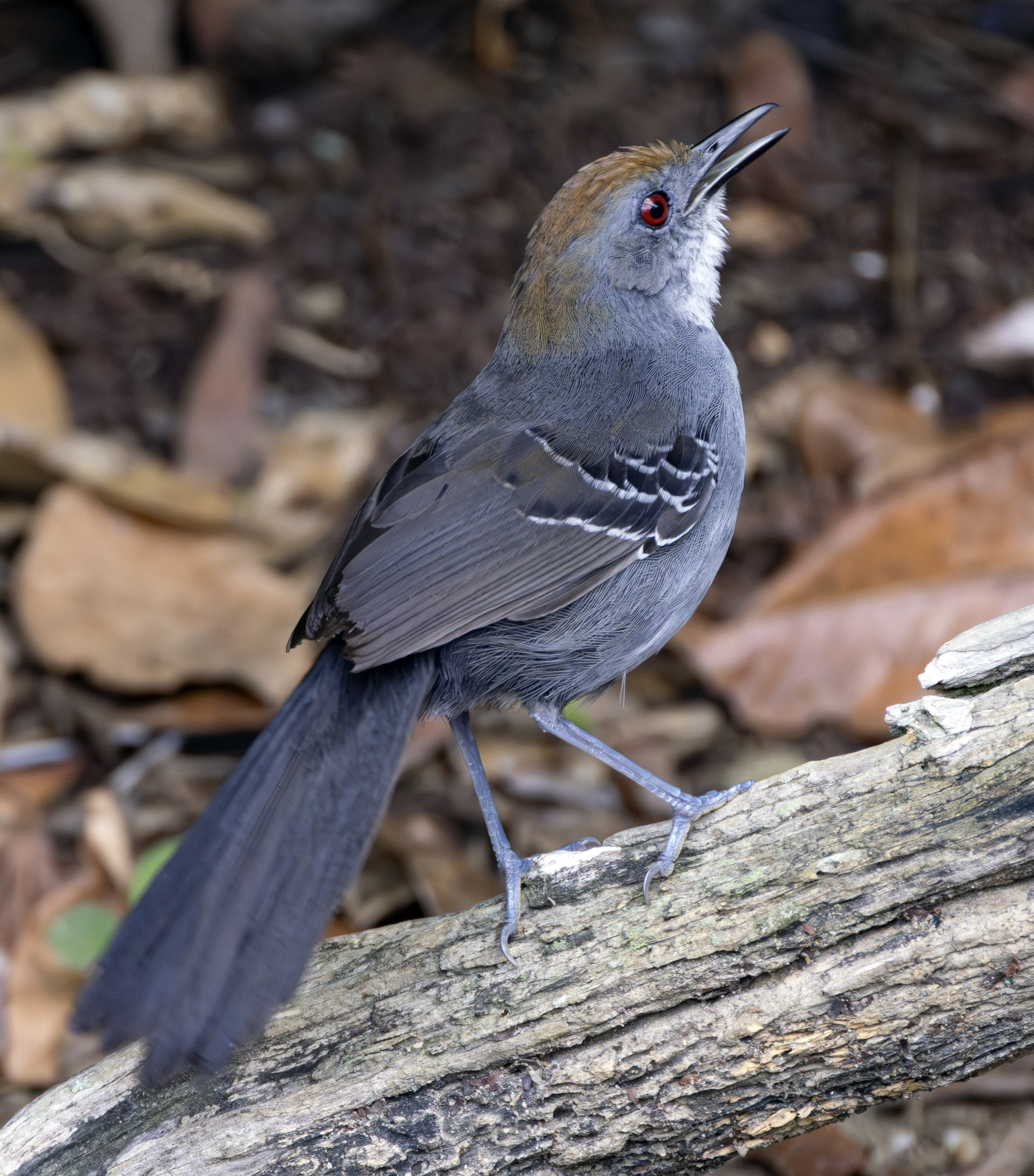
- Female

Conservation status
- Near Threatened (IUCN 3.1)

Scientific classification
- Kingdom: Animalia
- Phylum: Chordata
- Class: Aves
- Order: Passeriformes
- Family: Thamnophilidae
- Genus: Rhopornis; Richmond, 1902
- Species: R. ardesiacus

Binomial name
- Rhopornis ardesiacus (Wied, 1831)

= Slender antbird =

Species of bird in Brazil

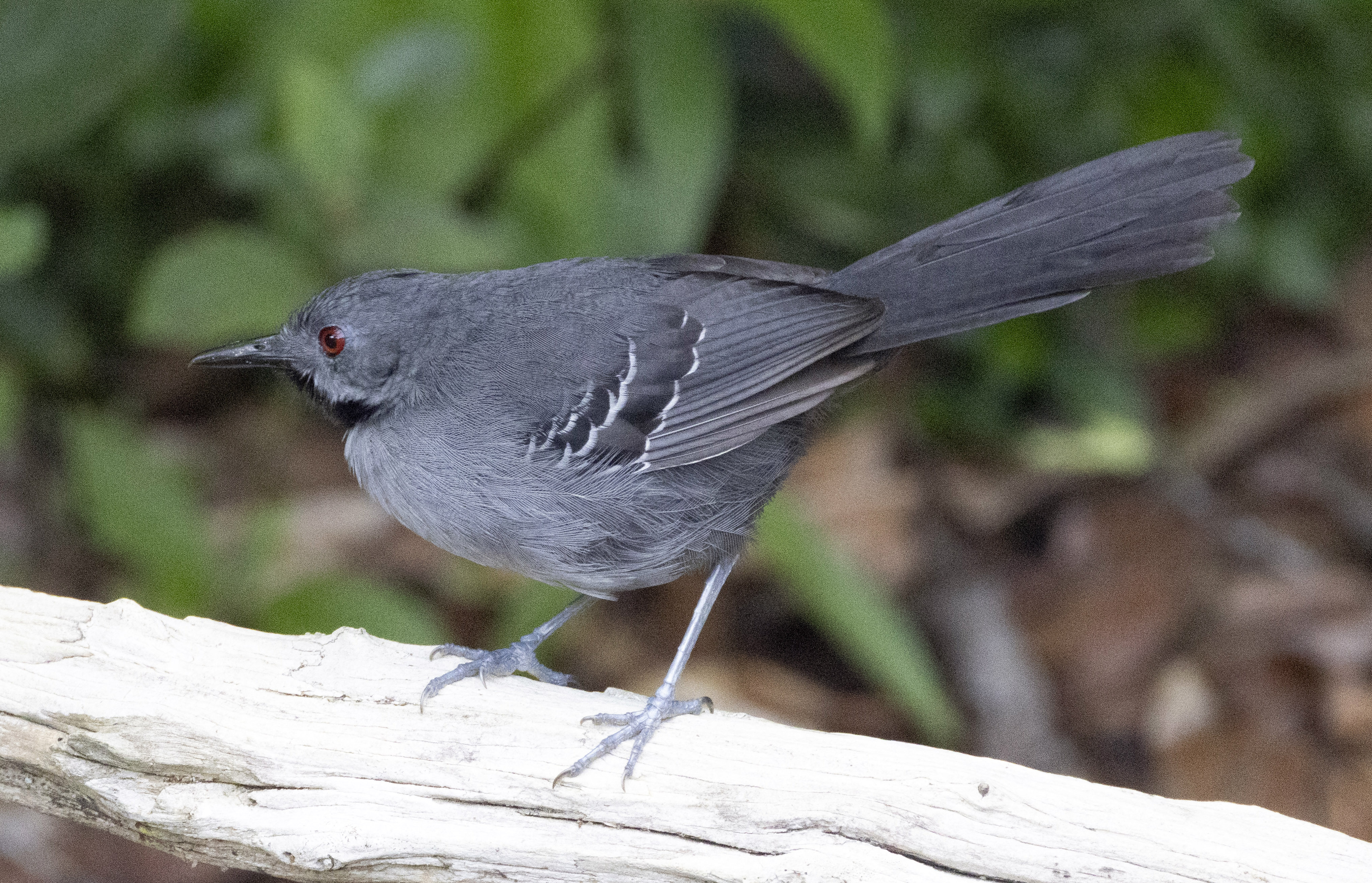
Slender Antbird, male. NE Brazil

The slender antbird (Rhopornis ardesiacus) is a Near Threatened species of bird in subfamily Thamnophilinae of family Thamnophilidae, the "typical antbirds". It is endemic to Brazil.

== Taxonomy and systematics ==
The slender antbird was described in 1831 as Myiothera ardesiaca. Its current genus Rhopornis was erected in 1902. The slender antbird is the only member of its genus and has no subspecies.

== Description ==
The slender antbird is 18 to 19 cm (7.1 to 7.5 in) long and weighs 23 to 28 g (0.81 to 0.99 oz). Adults of both sexes have bright red irises. Males have gray crown and upperparts. Their wings and tail are blackish gray with white edges on the tips of the wing coverts. Their face is mostly gray with a paler "moustache". Their throat is black and their underparts mostly pale gray that is darker on their flanks and crissum. Females have a russet crown and nape, a white throat, and paler underparts than males. Their upperparts, wings, and tail are like the male's.

== Distribution and habitat ==
The slender antbird is found discontinuously in southeastern Bahia and northeastern Minas Gerais states of eastern Brazil. It primarily inhabits the understorey of dry forest known locally as mata-de-cipó, which is characterized by a somewhat open understorey with large patches of terrestrial bromeliads. It also is found in the ecotones between that biome and both more humid forest and caatinga scrublands. In elevation it occurs between 100 and 1,000 m (300 and 3,300 ft) above sea level.

== Behavior ==
=== Movement ===
The slender antbird is a year-round resident throughout its range.

=== Feeding ===
The slender antbird feeds on a variety of insects and spiders. It typically forages singly, in pairs, or in family groups in dense vegetation, mostly on the ground and within about 4 m (13 ft) above it but occasionally as high as 7 m (23 ft). It hops between short feeding stops, pumping its tail. It captures prey by gleaning, reaching, jumping (upward and to the ground), lunging from a perch, and by searching leaf litter in bromeliads.

=== Breeding ===
The slender antbird's breeding season is thought to span from October to February. Its one known nest was a low cup made of dry leaves and vines resting on a leaf that drooped to the ground. It contained two red-spotted pale pink eggs. Both parents incubated the clutch; the incubation period was at least 13 days. The time to fledging was not determined because the nest was empty, apparently predated, six days after the young hatched.

=== Vocalization ===
The slender antbird's song is a "very high, loud, increasing series of 7-9 rather sharp 'peer' notes without intervals". Both sexes sing it, with the female starting during the male's song bout. The species' calls include "an abrupt, indistinct compound note sounding like 'brrt', a sharp upslurred 'seep', soft chatters, and [a] short (e.g. 0·9 seconds) chattering rattle that decelerates".

== Status ==
The IUCN originally in 1988 assessed the slender antbird as Threatened, and from 1994 – 2025 as Endangered. As of 2025, it has been downlisted to Near Threatened, due to a larger estimated population size than had previously been believed – 2,500-9,999 mature individuals as of its 2025 assessment. Its population is believed to be decreasing. It is primarily threatened by habitat destruction associated with livestock farming. Though its nominal total range covers about 20,000 km^{2} (7,700 sq mi), it actually inhabits areas totaling less than 500 km^{2} (190 sq mi). It does occur in Boa Nova National Park but "[f]urther protected areas are needed, particularly in remnant forests of Minas Gerais".
