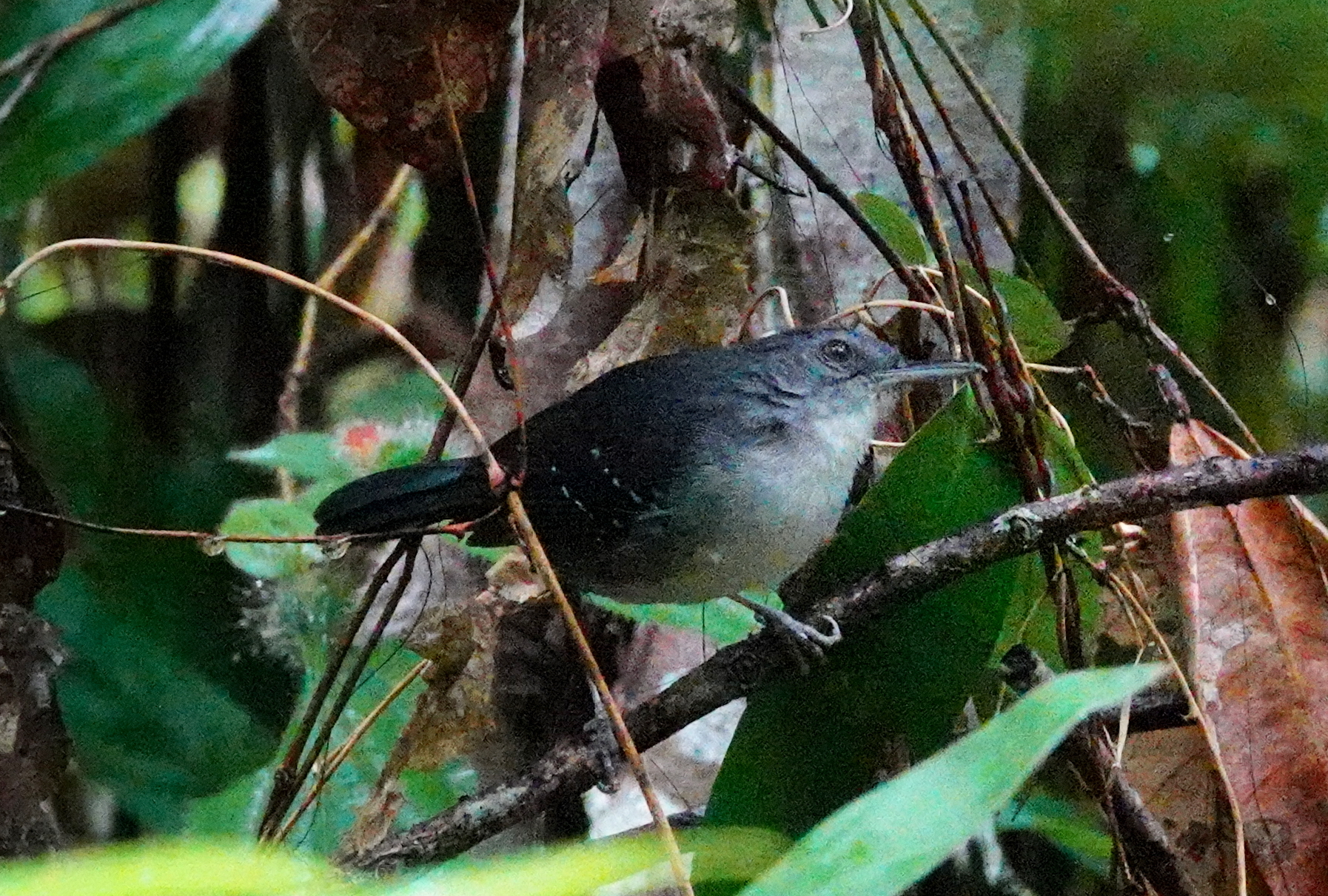

Conservation status
- Least Concern (IUCN 3.1)

Scientific classification
- Kingdom: Animalia
- Phylum: Chordata
- Class: Aves
- Order: Passeriformes
- Family: Thamnophilidae
- Genus: Aprositornis; Isler, Bravo & Brumfield, 2013
- Species: A. disjuncta

Binomial name
- Aprositornis disjuncta (Friedmann, 1945)

Synonyms
- Myrmeciza disjuncta

= Yapacana antbird =

Species of bird

The Yapacana antbird (Aprositornis disjuncta) is a species of passerine bird in subfamily Thamnophilinae of family Thamnophilidae, the "typical antbirds". It is found Brazil, Colombia, and Venezuela.

== Taxonomy and systematics ==
The Yapacana antbird was originally described by the American ornithologist Herbert Friedmann in 1945 and given the binomial name Myrmeciza disjuncta. A molecular phylogenetic study published in 2013 found that the genus Myrmeciza, as then defined, was polyphyletic. In the resulting rearrangement to create monophyletic genera the Yapacana antbird was moved to its own genus Aprositornis. The name of the genus combines the Ancient Greek words aprositos "unapproachable" or "hard to get at" and ornis "bird". The species' English name comes from the type locality, Cerro Yapacana on the upper Orinoco River in Venezuela.

The Yapacana antbird is monotypic.

== Description ==
The Yapacana antbird is 13 to 13.5 cm (5.1 to 5.3 in) long and weighs 14 to 15 g (0.49 to 0.53 oz). Adult males have a mostly gray face. Their crown, neck, back, and rump are dark gray with a white patch between the shoulders. Their tail is blackish gray. Their wings are blackish gray with narrow white tips on the flight feathers and wing coverts. Their underparts are white with a light gray tinge on the breast, flanks, and crissum. Adult females have upperparts like the male's but without the white tips on the flight feathers and wing coverts. Their underparts are light reddish yellow-brown with a paler throat and a gray tinge on the flanks. Both sexes have a blackish maxilla, a pale mandible, and pale pinkish gray legs. Subadult males are like adults with a light reddish yellow-brown tinge on their underparts.

== Distribution and habitat ==
The Yapacana antbird has a disjunct distribution. It is found locally in eastern Colombia's Guainía Department, in southwestern Venezuela's Amazonas state, and in the northwestern Brazilian states of Amazonas and Roraima. It inhabits the ground and understorey of low, dense, forest growing on white-sand soils that are seasonally flooded. In elevation it is found only as high as 150 m (500 ft) above sea level.

== Behavior ==
=== Movement ===
The Yapacana antbird is believed to be a year-round resident throughout its range.

=== Feeding ===
The Yapacana antbird feeds on arthropods, especially insects and spiders. It typically forages singly, in pairs, or in family groups and does not join mixed-species feeding flocks. It forages mostly on the ground under dense vegetation though it will feed as high as 1.5 m (5 ft) above the ground. It actively roots through ground litter in short pauses between hops and also gleans from foliage and branches while on a low perch. It occasionally attends army ant swarms to capture prey fleeing from the ants.

=== Breeding ===
Almost nothing is known about the Yapacana antbird's breeding biology. It appears to be territorial and to breed in the wet season.

=== Vocalization ===
The Yapacana antbird's song is a "curious, rapid sequence of 1 or 2 almost toneless, rising gratings, immediately followed by very high 'pipip' or 'pi', the total as 'grrrrr-pipip-grrrrr-pi' ". Its calls include a "single long harsh note at higher pitch" than the song, an "abrupt 'squip' ", and a "soft rattle".

== Status ==
The IUCN originally in 1988 assessed the Yapacana antbird as Near Threatened and since 2004 as being of Least Concern. It has a restricted range and an unknown population size whose trend is also unknown. No immediate threats have been identified. It is thought to be locally abundant but highly specific in its habitat requirements. It occurs in Venezuela's Yapacana National Park and in Brazil's Jaú and Pico da Neblina National Parks. "Continued protection of the national parks in which this thamnophilid is known to exist is critical, particularly with regard to exclusion of illegal gold-mining operations."
