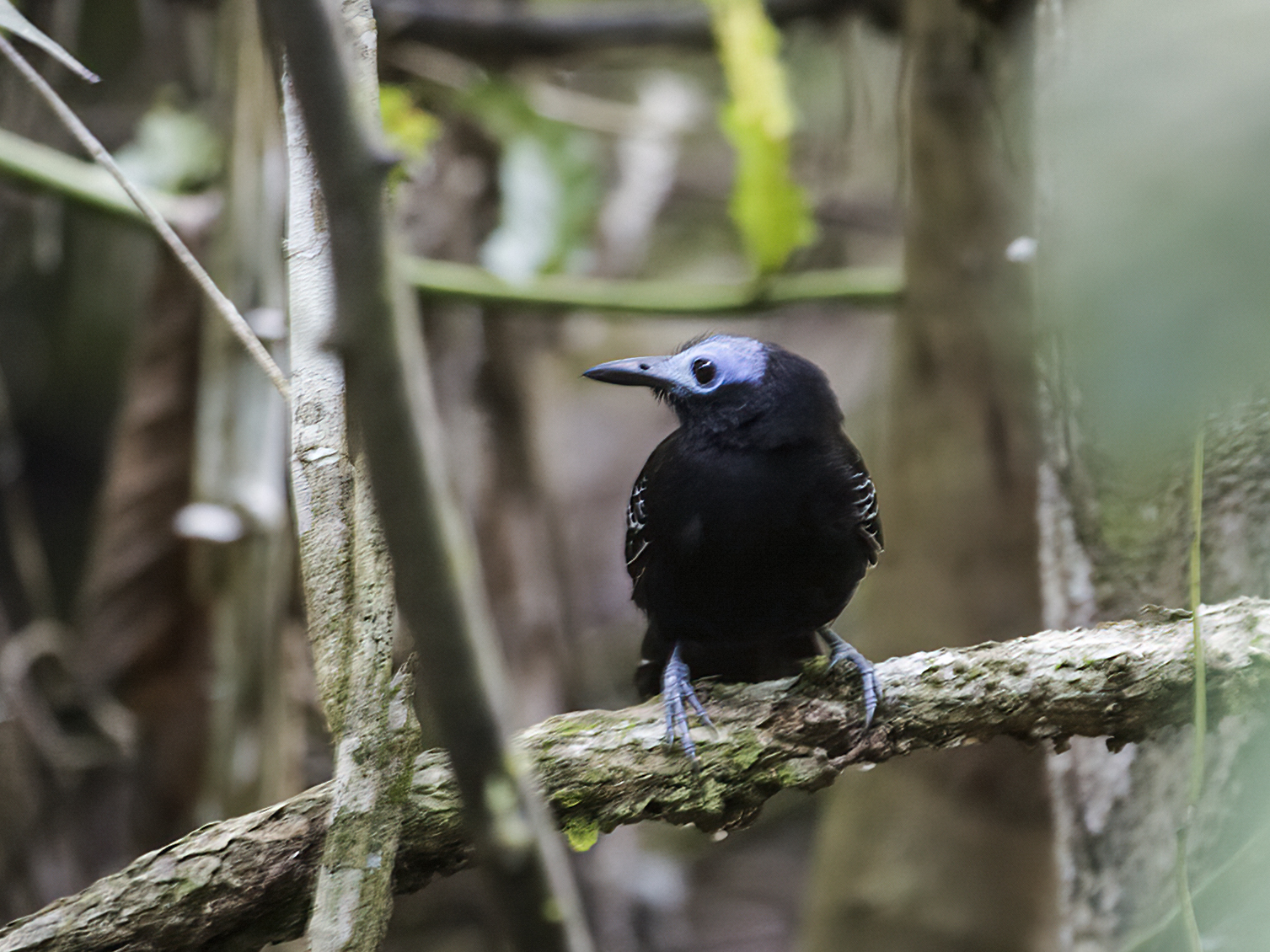

Conservation status
- Least Concern (IUCN 3.1)

Scientific classification
- Kingdom: Animalia
- Phylum: Chordata
- Class: Aves
- Order: Passeriformes
- Family: Thamnophilidae
- Genus: Gymnocichla; P.L. Sclater, 1858
- Species: G. nudiceps

Binomial name
- Gymnocichla nudiceps (Cassin, 1850)

= Bare-crowned antbird =

Species of bird

The bare-crowned antbird (Gymnocichla nudiceps) is a species of bird in subfamily Thamnophilinae of family Thamnophilidae, the "typical antbirds". It is found in Belize, Colombia, Costa Rica, Guatemala, Honduras, Mexico, Nicaragua, and Panama.

== Taxonomy and systematics ==
The bare-crowned antbird was originally described by the American ornithologist John Cassin in 1850 with the name Myiothera nudiceps. In 1858 the English zoologist Philip Sclater erected genus Gymnocichla and transferred the species to it.

The bare-crowned antbird is the only member of its genus and has these four subspecies:

- G. n. chiroleuca Sclater, PL & Salvin, 1869
- G. n. erratilis Bangs, 1907
- G. n. nudiceps (Cassin, 1850)
- G. n. sanctamartae Ridgway, 1908

== Description ==
The bare-crowned antbird is 15 to 17 cm (5.9 to 6.7 in) long and weighs 28 to 33 g (0.99 to 1.2 oz). Males of all four subspecies have bright blue bare skin on their forehead, forecrown, lores, and around their eyes. Females have the same blue skin on their lores and around their eyes. Adult males of the nominate subspecies G. n. nudiceps are otherwise almost entirely black. Their wing coverts have white tips, their alula and outermost primary have white edges, and their tail feathers have narrow white tips. Some individuals have a small white patch between their scapulars. Adult females have dark yellowish brown upperparts with a white interscapular patch. Their wings and tail are darker and redder than their upperparts. Their flight feathers and wing coverts have light cinnamon-rufous edges and their tail feathers have white tips. Their throat and underparts are cinnamon-rufous that is darker on their breast and browner on their flanks. Subadult males resemble adults but with a feathered forehead and forecrown, brownish black wings, and no white tips on the wing coverts. Both sexes have a red iris and gray legs and feet.

Males of subspecies G. n. chiroleuca have wider white tips on their wing coverts than the nominate. Females have olive-brown upperparts and a very small to no interscapular patch. Males of G. n. erratilis have white on their wing coverts that is intermediate between the nominate's and chiroleuca's. Females have bright cinnamon-brown upperparts. Both sexes of G. n. sanctamartae are paler than the nominate. Males have wider white tips on their wing coverts than the nominate.

== Distribution and habitat ==
The subspecies of the bare-crowned antbird are found thus:

- G. n. chiroleuca: Caribbean slope from southern Belize through Guatemala, Honduras, Nicaragua, and Costa Rica into western Panama's Bocas del Toro Province; one record in extreme southeastern Mexico
- G. n. erratilis: from San José and Puntarenas provinces on the Pacific slope of Costa Rica into western Panama's Chiriquí Province
- G. n. nudiceps: from Coclé Province in central Panama south on both slopes into northwestern Colombia as far as Valle del Cauca Department
- G. n. sanctamartae: northern Colombia from Córdoba and Antioquia departments east slightly into La Guajira Department

The bare-crowned antbird inhabits dense understorey vegetation in lowland and foothill evergreen forest. It primarily occurs at the edges of primary forest, in secondary forest, and in clearings and old plantations with regenerating vegetation. It often is found in swampy areas and along stagnant streams. In elevation it ranges from sea level to 250 m (800 ft) in most of Central America, to 1,200 m (3,900 ft) in Costa Rica and Panama, and to 600 m (2,000 ft) in Colombia.

== Behavior ==
=== Movement ===
The bare-crowned antbird is a year-round resident throughout its range.

=== Feeding ===
The bare-crowned antbird's diet includes a variety insects (e.g. cockroaches, beetles, ants, and grasshoppers), other arthropods such as spiders, and small lizards. It typically forages singly, in pairs, or in family groups in dense vegetation, mostly on the ground and within about 2.5 m (8 ft) above it. It hops between feeding stops, bobbing its tail. It captures prey by gleaning, reaching, jumping (up and to the ground), and lunging from a perch. It regularly follows army ant swarms that cross its territory to capture prey disturbed by the ants; except at ant swarms it seldom associates with other bird species.

=== Breeding ===
Almost nothing is known about the bare-crowned antbird's breeding biology. One well-described nest was discovered in June in Costa Rica. It was a dome of thin plant fibers and dead leaves, placed about 11 cm (4 in) above the ground on horizontal Philodendron stems. The entrance was concealed by overhanging leaves. When discovered, the male flushed from the nest where it had been brooding two nestlings. The female was later observed brooding them. Both parents vocalized when they returned to the nest. Both parents provisioned the nestlings; spiders and small insect larvae were noted. Another nest, discovered in April also in Costa Rica, was of similar construction but placed about 1.2 m (4 ft) above the ground nestled in leaf litter on a broken palm. It contained two brown-blotched white eggs, and as in the other sighting, the male flushed from the nest.

=== Vocalization ===
The male bare-crowned antbird's song is "a series of clear sweet whistles, rising in middle and accelerating at end, Teuu-tip-Tip-Tip-Tip-Tip-Tip-Tip-Tip-Tip'Tip'Tip'Tip'Tip". Females sing a similar song starting in the middle of the male's song. One call is "a sharp Peeet!". Others are "a longer...rising and falling note...and [a] trill-like bubbling rattle that often drops initially in pitch and intensity". The species often vibrates its tail when singing.

== Status ==
The IUCN has assessed the bare-crowned antbird as being of Least Concern. It has a very large range; its estimated population of at least 500,000 mature individuals is believed to be decreasing. No immediate threats have been identified. It is considered uncommon in northern Central America, rare to common in various parts of Costa Rica, and local in Colombia. "Although this is primarily a bird of second-growth habitats, the widespread conversion of native forest to cattle pasture and intensive agricultural production, especially oil palms (Elaeis guineensis), pineapple and bananas in lowlands and coffee in foothills, is not conducive to sparing or creating the kinds of mature second growth that this species requires."
