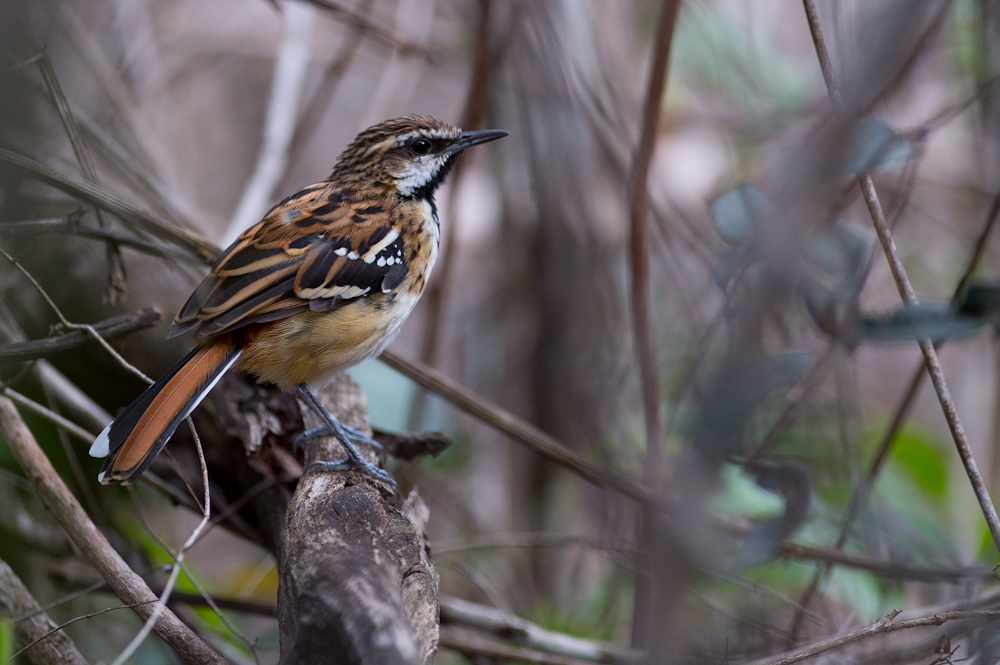

Conservation status
- Least Concern (IUCN 3.1)

Scientific classification
- Kingdom: Animalia
- Phylum: Chordata
- Class: Aves
- Order: Passeriformes
- Family: Thamnophilidae
- Genus: Myrmorchilus; Ridgway, 1909
- Species: M. strigilatus

Binomial name
- Myrmorchilus strigilatus (Wied, 1831)

= Stripe-backed antbird =

Species of bird

The stripe-backed antbird (Myrmorchilus strigilatus) is a species of bird in subfamily Thamnophilinae of family Thamnophilidae, the "typical antbirds". It is found in Argentina, Bolivia, Brazil and Paraguay.

== Taxonomy and systematics ==
The genus Myrmorchilus was erected by the American ornithologist Robert Ridgway in 1909. The stripe-backed antbird is the only member of the genus. It has two subspecies, the nominate M. s. strigilatus (Wied, 1831) and M. s. suspicax (Wetmore, 1922).

== Description ==
The stripe-backed antbird is 15 to 16 cm (5.9 to 6.3 in) long and weighs 23 to 26 g (0.81 to 0.92 oz). Adult males of the nominate subspecies have a white supercilium and a dark line through the eye on an otherwise buffy face. Their crown, neck, and back are rufous with black streaks; their rump and uppertail coverts are plain rufous. Their central tail feathers are rufous and the outer ones black with white outer edges and tips. Their wings are black with some rufous on the edges of the flight feathers; their wing coverts are black with white tips. Their throat and breast are black. The rest of their underparts are white with black spots on the sides and flanks and a buff tinge to the crissum. Adult females have a buff throat, breast, and belly with darker streaks on the sides and breast. Males of subspecies M. s. suspicax have a buff supercilium, flanks, and crissum; females have a brownish supercilium and deeper buff flanks and crissum than the nominate.

== Distribution and habitat ==
The stripe-backed antbird has a disjunct distribution. The nominate subspecies is found in northeastern Brazil in an area roughtly bounded by eastern Piauí, Rio Grande do Norte, and northern Minas Gerais. Subspecies M. s. suspicax is found in the western parts of Brazil's Mato Grosso and Mato Grosso do Sul states, in southeastern Bolivia, in western Paraguay, and in northern Argentina as far south as Santa Fe Province.

The nominate subspecies primarily inhabits caatinga woodlands and scrublands. Subspecies M. s. suspicax primarily inhabits the woodlands and scrublands of the Gran Chaco. In both ecozones it favors areas with dense ground cover. In elevation it ranges up to about 1,100 m (3,600 ft).

== Behavior ==
=== Movement ===
The stripe-backed antbird is believed to be a year-round resident throughout its range.

=== Feeding ===
The stripe-backed antbird feeds on arthropods, especially insects. It typically forages singly or in pairs, and mostly on the ground under dense vegetation though it will feed as high as 2 m (7 ft) above the ground. It picks through leaf litter and terrestrial bromeliads, reaches up to glean from foliage, and sometimes jumps to glean from higher leaves, branches, and vines.

=== Breeding ===
The two known stripe-backed antbird nests were open cups of dry grass on the ground; both contained two eggs. Nothing else is known about the species' breeding biology.

=== Vocalization ===
The two subspecies of the stripe-backed antbird appear to have the same song. It is a "[v]ery/extr. high, sharp 'sreet-soweét' " that is sometimes followed by a "strident, slightly descending 'sreet-sreet-sreet-sruw-sruw' ". The species' call is "a long...whistle, entirely downslurred or slightly rising and falling".

== Status ==
The IUCN has assessed the stripe-backed antbird as being of Least Concern. Both subspecies have very large ranges. The species' population size is not known and is believed to be decreasing. No immediate threats have been identified. It is considered fairly common in both ranges. However, very little of either is protected by parks and preserves, and conversion of the habitat to agriculture and grazing is ongoing.
