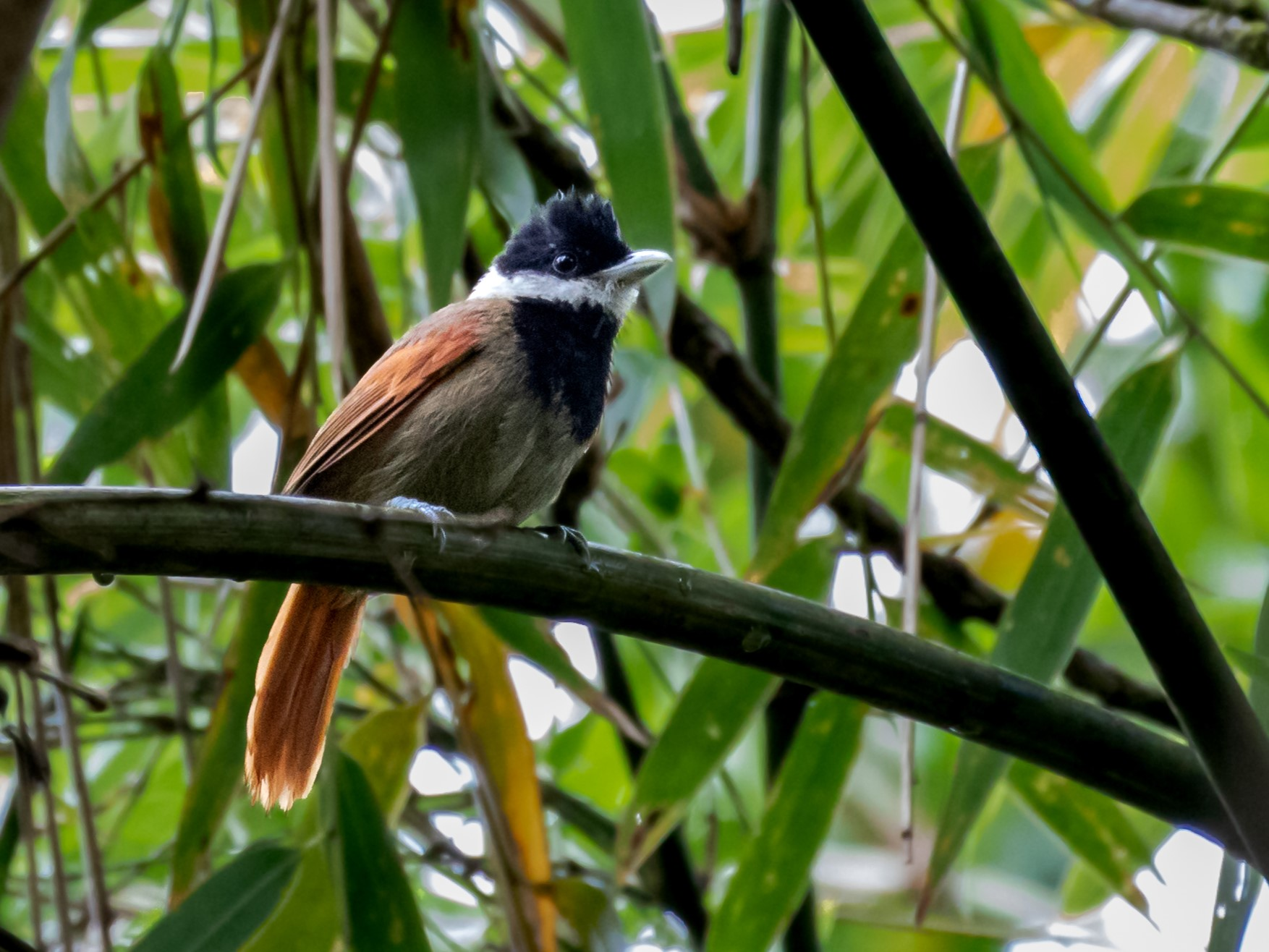
- Male
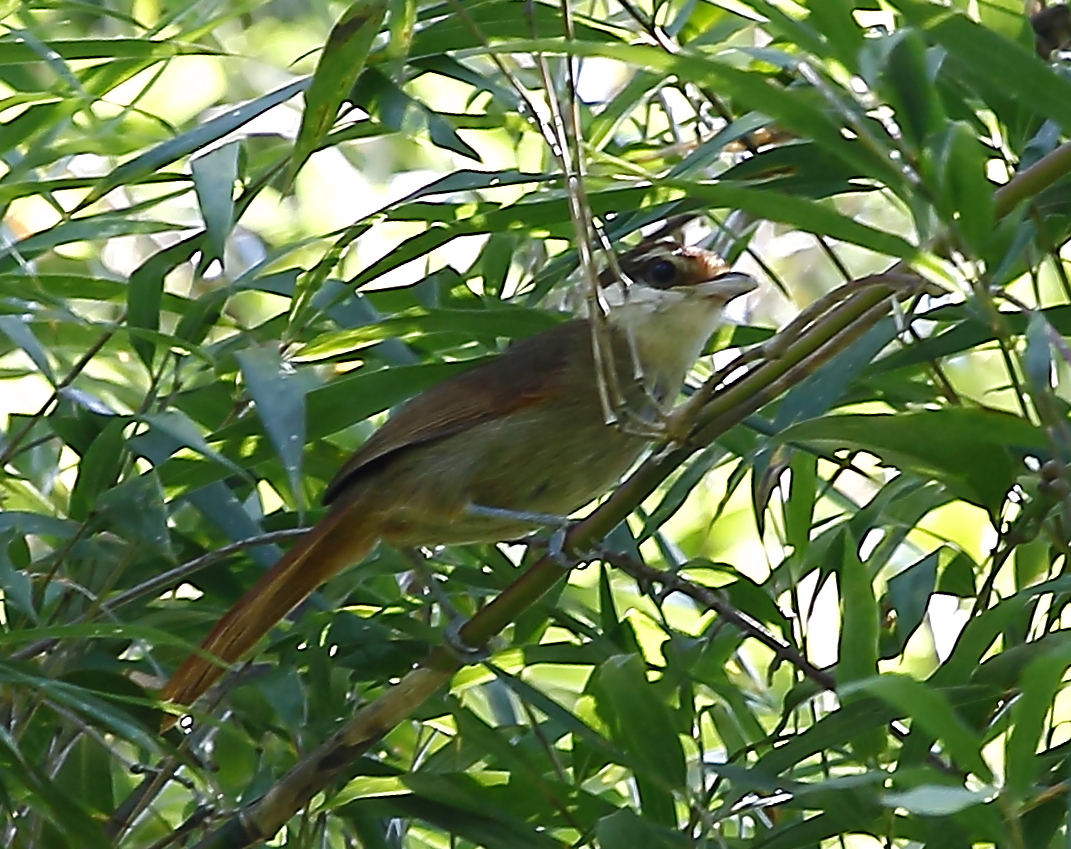
- Female

Conservation status
- Vulnerable (IUCN 3.1)

Scientific classification
- Kingdom: Animalia
- Phylum: Chordata
- Class: Aves
- Order: Passeriformes
- Family: Thamnophilidae
- Genus: Biatas; Cabanis & Heine, 1860
- Species: B. nigropectus

Binomial name
- Biatas nigropectus (Lafresnaye, 1850)

= White-bearded antshrike =

Species of bird

The white-bearded antshrike (Biatas nigropectus) is a Vulnerable species of bird in subfamily Thamnophilinae of family Thamnophilidae, the "typical antbirds". It is endemic to Argentina and Brazil.

== Taxonomy and systematics ==
The white-bearded antshrike was described by the French ornithologist Frédéric de Lafresnaye in 1850 and given the binomial name Anabates nigro-pectus. It was later moved to its current genus Biatas that was erected by the German ornithologists Jean Cabanis and Ferdinand Heine in 1860 with the white-bearded antshrike as the type species. The name of the genus is from the Ancient Greek biatas meaning "tyrant". Its specific epithet combines the Latin words niger meaning "black" and pectus meaning "breast".

The white-bearded antshrike is the only member of its genus and has no subspecies.

== Description ==
The white-bearded antshrike is 17 to 18 cm (6.7 to 7.1 in) long. This species exhibits some sexual dimorphism, and both sexes have a crest. Adult males have a black forehead, crown, and upper nape. The black of the crown extends down to the lores and eyes except for a faint white line through the eye. Their chin and the rest of their face are white that becomes pale buff around the lower nape. Their upperparts are reddish yellow-brown and their wings and tail are rufous. Their lower throat and breast are black and the rest of their underparts clay-colored. Females have a rufous-brown crown, a distinct white supercilium, and no black on the throat and breast. Their back, wings, tail, and lower underparts are like the male's.

== Distribution and habitat ==
The white-bearded antshrike has a disjunct distribution. It is found intermittently in south-eastern Brazil from Minas Gerais south into northeastern Santa Catarina and in northeastern Argentina's Misiones Province. Though the International Ornithological Committee also includes eastern Paraguay in its range, the South American Classification Committee of the American Ornithological Society has no records from that country, and the Clements taxonomy does not include it.

The white-bearded antshrike is a bamboo specialist. It primarily inhabits bamboo in evergreen forest and mature secondary forest, and in parts of Brazil is found only in very large stands of Merostachys bamboo. It also occurs in the ecotone between cerrado and secondary forest in Minas Gerais and in Araucaria forest in Paraná, but always in association with bamboo. An extensive survey in Misiones, Argentina, found it only in stands of Guadua trinii bamboo. In all areas it favors the forests' understorey to mid-storey. In elevation it ranges between 500 and 1,200 m (1,600 and 3,900 ft).

== Behavior ==
=== Movement ===
The white-bearded antshrike is believed to be a year-round resident throughout its range but is also believed to make local movements as patches of bamboo die.

=== Feeding ===
The white-bearded antshrike's diet has not been fully defined but is known to include insects, spiders, and seeds. It forages singly or in pairs and often joins mixed-species feeding flocks. It feeds primarily in and very near bamboo, and typically between about 1 and 10 m (3 and 30 ft) above the ground. It hops along bamboo stems and tree branches, gleaning prey from stems and foliage by reaching in all directions and sometimes making short upward sallies from a perch.

=== Breeding ===
The white-bearded antshrike's breeding season has not been fully defined but in Brazil it appears to span at least October to December. Two nests are known. They were bowl-like platforms of dead bamboo leaves and a few other plant fibers placed high in dense bamboo thickets. Nothing else is known about the species' breeding biology.

=== Vocalization ===
The white-bearded antshrike's song is a "slow series of 6-8 mournful, yet melodious notes, first rising, then lowering in pitch at the end". In the Argentina study, only two males were seen singing spontaneously and many males but few females sang in response to recordings. The species' call is "a complaining downslurred note" that is doubled or repeated in a longer series.

== Status ==
The IUCN originally in 1988 assessed the white-bearded antshrike as Threatened and since 1994 as Vulnerable. It has a restricted and fractured range; its estimated population of between 2500 and 10,000 mature individuals is believed to be decreasing. Its Atlantic Forest habitat has been severely depleted by destruction for human settlement, pasture, agriculture, and mining. "It is a species that could easily 'fall through the cracks' of current conservation policies, because its bamboo habitat is rarely contemplated in conservation strategies for the Atlantic forest." It is considered rare and was apparently never common. The period die-off characteristic of bamboo makes habitat conservation difficult. It does occur in several protected areas.
