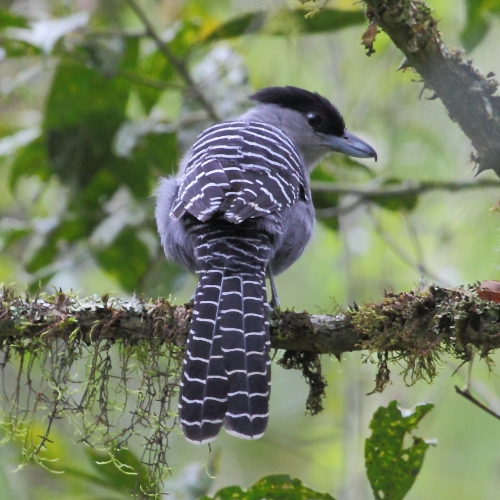

Conservation status
- Least Concern (IUCN 3.1)

Scientific classification
- Kingdom: Animalia
- Phylum: Chordata
- Class: Aves
- Order: Passeriformes
- Family: Thamnophilidae
- Genus: Batara; Lesson, 1831
- Species: B. cinerea

Binomial name
- Batara cinerea (Vieillot, 1819)

= Giant antshrike =

Species of bird

The giant antshrike (Batara cinerea) is a species of bird in subfamily Thamnophilinae of family Thamnophilidae, the "typical antbirds". It is found in Argentina, Bolivia, Brazil, and Paraguay.

== Taxonomy and systematics ==
The giant antshrike was described by the French ornithologist Louis Pierre Vieillot in 1819 and given the binomial name Thamnphilus cinerea (misspelled as Tamnphilus). The current genus Batara was introduced by the French naturalist René Lesson in 1831. It is the only member of genus Batara and has three subspecies, the nominate B. c. cinerea (Vieillot, 1819), B. c. excubitor (Bond, J & Meyer de Schauensee, 1940), and B. c. argentina (Shipton, 1918).

== Description ==
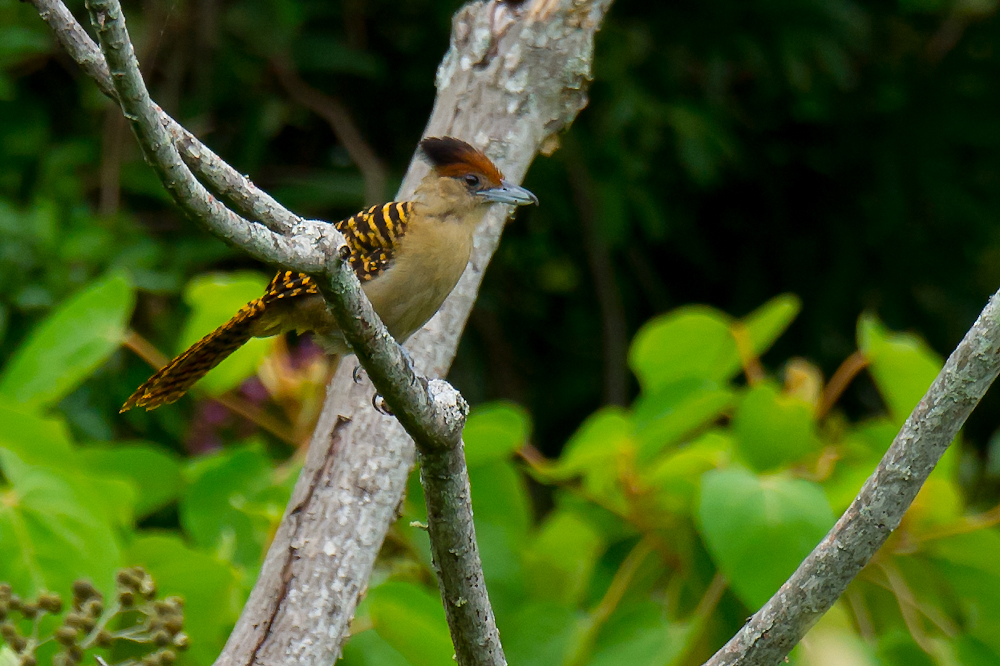
A female giant antshrike.

The giant antshrike is the largest antbird, 27 to 35 cm (11 to 14 in) long and weighing 100 to 155 g (3.5 to 5.5 oz). The species exhibits significant sexual dimorphism, though both sexes have a crest, a very long and wide tail, and a long gray bill with a hook at the end like true shrikes. Adult males of the nominate subspecies have a black forehead, crown, and crest. Their back, wings, and tail are barred with black and white. Their face, nape, throat, and underparts are neutral gray. Adult females have a rufous crest with some black feather tips. Their back, wings, and tail are barred with cinnamon-buff and dark brown. Their face, nape, throat, and underparts are mostly olive that becomes yellowish by their crissum. Subspecies B. c. argentina is smaller than the nominate. Compared to it, males have fewer bars on their wings and tail; females have less black on their crest, slightly paler upperparts, and warmer underparts. B. c. excubitor is paler overall than argentina, and the difference might be clinal.

== Distribution and habitat ==
The giant antshrike has a disjunct distribution. The nominate subspecies is separate from the others. It is found from southern Espírito Santo and southwestern São Paulo states in southeastern Brazil south to central Rio Grande do Sul and into northeastern Argentina's Misiones Province. Subspecies B. c. excubitor is found only in western Santa Cruz Department in central Bolivia. B. c. argentina is found in southern Bolivia's Santa Cruz, Chuquisaca and Tarija departments, in northwestern Argentina's Jujuy, Salta, and Tucumán provinces, and in western Paraguay's Boquerón and Presidente Hayes departments.

The giant antshrike inhabits landscapes that vary geographically, though in all it favors the understorey to mid-storey. In the Atlantic Forest it occurs from humid evergreen forest near sea level up to elfin forest at about 2,200 m (7,200 ft). It almost always is found in or near large stands of bamboo. To the west in the Andes it occurs in montane forest as high as 2,600 m (8,500 ft), mostly in dense vegetation along ravines and streams. At lower elevations in Argentina, Bolivia, and Paraguay it occurs in stunted woodlands of the semi-arid Gran Chaco where it favors dense thorny thickets.

== Behavior ==
=== Movement ===
The giant antshrike is presumed to be a year-round resident throughout its range, though local movements in response to bamboo die-off are likely.

=== Feeding ===
The giant antshrike feeds on a variety of large insects and other arthropods; its diet also includes molluscs, small vertebrates like frogs, lizards, and snakes, and possibly mice, nestling birds, and bird eggs. It usually forages singly or in pairs, mostly below about 5 m (15 ft) above the ground though as high as 15 m (50 ft). It does not join mixed-species feeding flocks. It hops and makes short flights to find prey, which it gleans by reaching from a perch to leaves, stems, and branches.

=== Breeding ===
The giant antshrike's breeding season appears to vary geographically but is generally within October to December. It makes a large messy cup nest of plant fibers and leaves, typically in a branch fork among dense vegetation about 1.5 to 3 m (5 to 10 ft) above the ground. The usual clutch is two eggs, which are whitish with darkish and reddish markings. The incubation period, time to fledging, and details of parental care are not known.

=== Vocalization ===
The giant antshrike's song is a "series that starts with a short trill and continues with a fast series of notes that increase in strength and pitch, leveling out and decelerating at the end". Its calls include a "long, raspy, downward-inflected snarl, often repeated rapidly, and a short even series of abrupt loud notes".

== Status ==
The IUCN has assessed the giant antshrike as being of Least Concern. It has a large range; its population size is not known and is believed to be decreasing. No immediate threats have been identified. It occurs in several large protected areas. However, it "[r]equires relatively large territories [and] does not survive in small residual forest patches in the Atlantic Forest".
