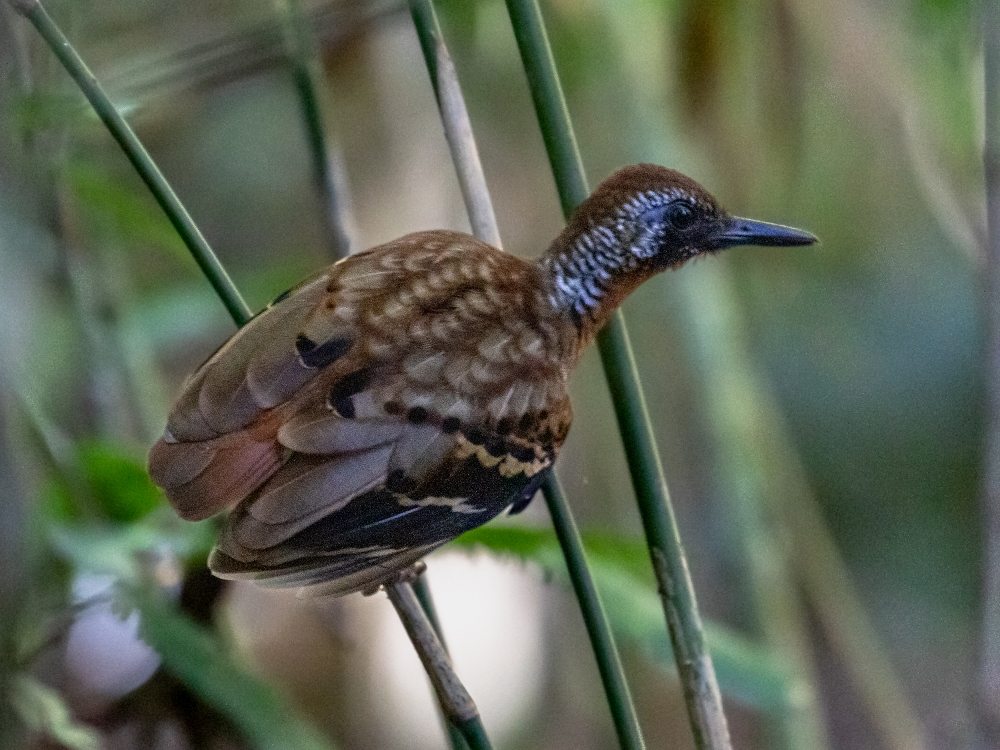

Conservation status
- Least Concern (IUCN 3.1)

- Least Concern (IUCN 3.1)

Scientific classification
- Kingdom: Animalia
- Phylum: Chordata
- Class: Aves
- Order: Passeriformes
- Family: Thamnophilidae
- Genus: Myrmornis; Hermann, 1783
- Species: M. torquata

Binomial name
- Myrmornis torquata (Boddaert, 1783)

= Wing-banded antbird =

Species of bird

The wing-banded antbird (Myrmornis torquata) is a species of passerine bird in subfamily Myrmornithinae of family Thamnophilidae, the "typical antbirds". It is found in Brazil, Colombia, Ecuador, French Guiana, Guyana, Nicaragua, Panama, Peru, Suriname, and Venezuela.

== Taxonomy and systematics ==
The wing-banded antbird was described by French polymath Georges-Louis Leclerc, Comte de Buffon in 1779 in his Histoire Naturelle des Oiseaux from a specimen collected in Cayenne, French Guiana. The bird was also illustrated in a hand-colored plate engraved by François-Nicolas Martinet in the Planches Enluminées D'Histoire Naturelle which was produced under the supervision of Edme-Louis Daubenton to accompany Buffon's text. Neither the plate caption nor Buffon's description included a scientific name but in 1783 the Dutch naturalist Pieter Boddaert coined the binomial name Formicarius torquatus in his catalogue of the Planches Enluminées. The wing-banded antbird is now the only species placed in the genus Myrmornis that was introduced by the French naturalist Johann Hermann in 1783. The generic name combines the Ancient Greek murmēx meaning "ant" and ornis meaning "bird". The specific name torquata or torquatus is the Latin for "collared".

The further taxonomy of the wing-banded antbird is unsettled. The International Ornithological Committee, the Clements taxonomy, and the South American Classification Committee of the American Ornithological Society assign it two subspecies, the nominate M. t. torquata (Boddaert, 1783) and M. t. stictoptera (Salvin, 1893). BirdLife International's Handbook of the Birds of the World (HBW) treats the two taxa as separate species: the northern wing-banded antbird (Myrmornis stictoptera) and the southern wing-banded antbird (Myrmornis torquata).

The wing-banded antbird has also been called the wing-banded antpitta and wing-banded antthrush. The "northern" wing-banded antbird has also been called the buff-banded antbird.

This article follows the single species, two subspecies model.

== Description ==
The wing-banded antbird is 14.5 to 15.5 cm (5.7 to 6.1 in) long and weighs 40 to 50 g (1.4 to 1.8 oz). It is distinctively plumaged, and its short tail and legs and "dumpy" body are also unusual among antbirds. The sexes have different plumage. Adult males of the nominate subspecies have a mostly black and white speckled face and the sides of the neck. Bare blue skin surrounds their eye. Their crown and nape are reddish brown. Their back feathers are grayish brown with reddish brown edges and black spots. Their rump and uppertail coverts are gray with wide rufous tips on the feathers. Their tail is rufous brown with dark brown feather tips. Their wing coverts are blackish brown with pale cinnamon buff tips and their flight feathers blackish brown with a pale cinnamon band on the edges of the primaries. Their throat and upper breast are black with a black and white speckled band below the upper breast. Their lower breast and belly are gray and their undertail coverts cinnamon rufous. Adult females have paler upperparts than males and their upper breast is cinnamon rufous. In both sexes their iris is dark brown, their bill black, and their legs and feet dark gray to fuscous. Juveniles of both sexes have a dark chocolate crown and nape; they are mostly chocolate brown otherwise with a paler grayish brown rump and uppertail coverts. Subspecies M. t. stictoptera is darker and somewhat more richly colored overall than the nominate. Black and white speckles are restricted to their face. Their breast has less black (males) and rufous (females) than the nominate and the bands on their wings and wing coverts are wider and darker.

== Distribution and habitat ==
The wing-banded antbird has a disjunct distribution. Subspecies M. t. stictoptera is the more northerly of the two and has a much smaller range than the nominate. It is found separately in southeastern Honduras and northeastern Nicaragua, in southeastern Nicaragua, and from the region of the Panama Canal east into northwestern Colombia. The nominate subspecies has two populations. One extends from central and southeastern Colombia, through northeastern Ecuador where it is scarce and local, and into northern Peru. The other extends from southeastern Venezuela east through the Guianas, east in Brazil to the Atlantic Ocean, and south in Amazonian Brazil to eastern Rondônia and northern Mato Grosso.

The wing-banded antbird inhabits humid lowland and foothill evergreen forest, where it is found almost exclusively on and near the ground. It favors terra firme, often among hills. In elevation it occurs from sea level to about 1,250 m (4,100 ft) in Central America but in South America is seldom found above 900 m (3,000 ft) and typically reaches only 400 m (1,300 ft) in Colombia and Ecuador.

== Behavior ==
=== Movement ===
The wing-banded antbird is thought to be a year-round resident throughout its range.

=== Feeding ===
The wing-banded antbird feeds mostly on arthropods and also includes small molluscs in its diet. It forages singly, in pairs, and in small family groups and does not join mixed-species feeding flocks or follow army ant swarms. It feeds mostly on the ground, hopping about and flipping over leaf litter.

=== Breeding ===
The wing-banded antbird appears to have an extended nesting season, with records from March to May in both Central and South America and also from July to October in South America. Both subspecies build a cup nest of plant and fungal fibers suspended in a shrub or sapling, usually within 2 m (7 ft) of the ground. The clutch size is one egg. The incubation period, time to fledging, and details of parental care are not known.

=== Vocalization ===
The song of the wing-banded antbird's nominate subspecies is a "series of 2-30 gradually rising, stressed, ringing 'weew' notes". That of M. t. stictoptera is similar but has upslurred notes and is faster. The species' call is "a nasal 'chirr' or churr' ".

== Status ==
The IUCN follows HBW taxonomy and so has separately assessed the "northern" and "southern" wing-banded antbirds. The "northern" M. t. stictoptera was originally in 1988 assessed as Near Threatened. It was not recognized between 1994 and 2016, at which date it was assessed as being of Least Concern. The "southern" M. t. torquata was first assessed in 2016, as being of Least Concern. The 2016 assessements were repeated in 2022. The size of neither the "northern" nor "southern" population is known and both are believed to be decreasing. No immediate threats to either have been identified. The species is considered fairly common (though thinly distributed) in Brazil, uncommon in Panama, and rare to uncommon elsewhere. It occurs in several protected areas. "Apparent large gaps in its distribution could be real, or may be result of extremely low densities combined with under-sampling."
