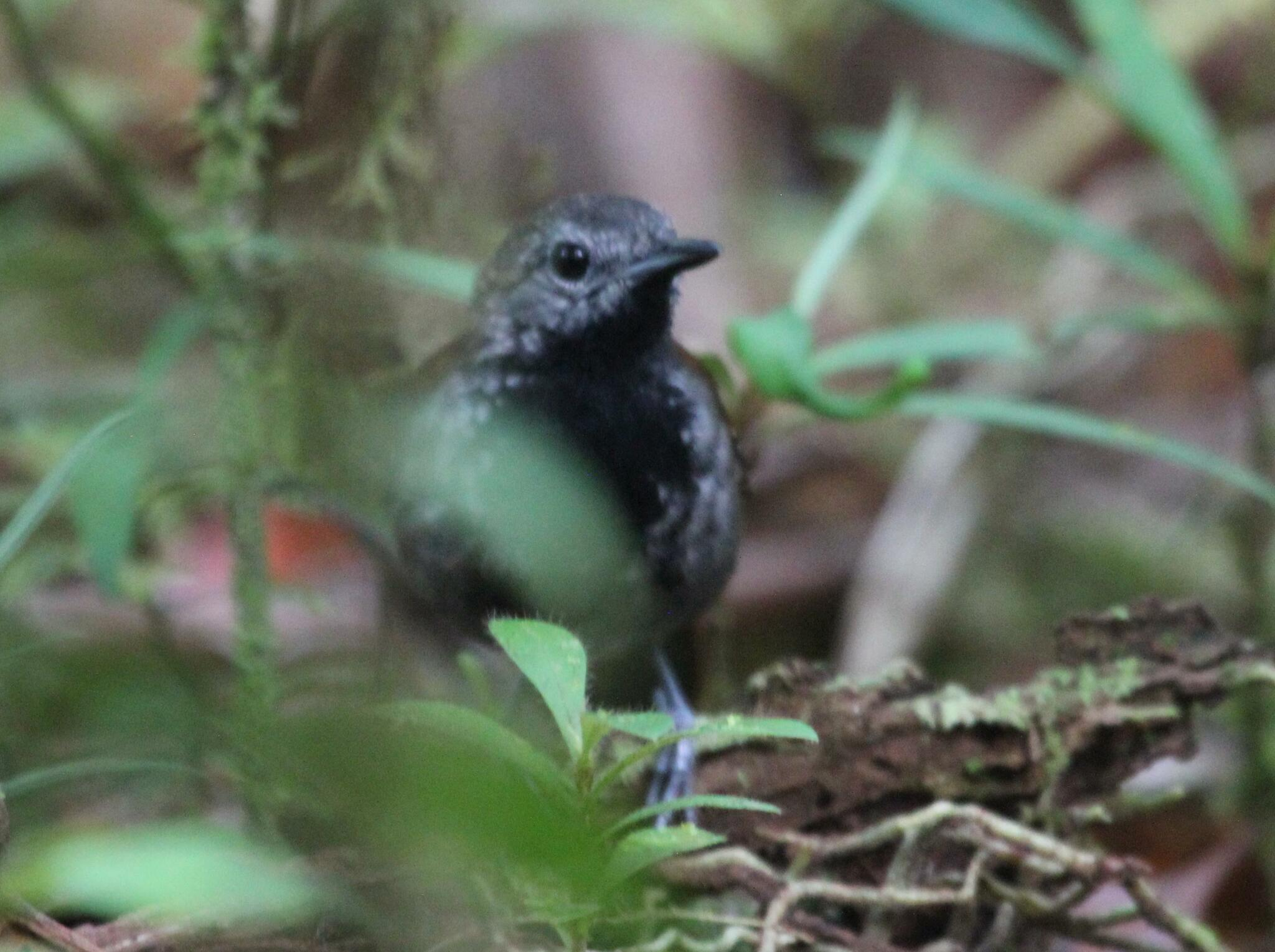

Conservation status
- Least Concern (IUCN 3.1)

Scientific classification
- Kingdom: Animalia
- Phylum: Chordata
- Class: Aves
- Order: Passeriformes
- Family: Thamnophilidae
- Genus: Ammonastes; Bravo, Isler, ML & Brumfield, 2013
- Species: A. pelzelni

Binomial name
- Ammonastes pelzelni (Sclater, PL, 1890)

Synonyms
- Myrmeciza pelzelni

= Grey-bellied antbird =

Species of bird

The grey-bellied antbird (Ammonastes pelzelni) is a species of passerine bird in subfamily Thamnophilinae of family Thamnophilidae, the "typical antbirds". It is found Brazil, Colombia, and Venezuela.

== Taxonomy and systematics ==
The grey-bellied antbird was originally described by the English zoologist Philip Sclater in 1890 and given the binomial name Myrmeciza pelzelni. A molecular phylogenetic study published in 2013 found that the genus Myrmeciza was polyphyletic. In the resulting rearrangement to create monophyletic genera the grey-bellied antbird was moved to its own genus Ammonastes. The name of the genus combines the Ancient Greek words ammos "sand" and nastes "inhabitant" as the grey-bellied antbird occurs in vegetation growing on sandy soil. The specific epithet honors the Austrian ornithologist August von Pelzeln (1825–1891).

The grey-bellied antbird is monotypic.

== Description ==
The grey-bellied antbird is 12.5 to 14 cm (4.9 to 5.5 in) long and weighs 17 to 18.5 g (0.60 to 0.65 oz). Adult males have a mottled whitish and gray face. Their crown is dark grayish brown and their back and rump are yellowish red-brown. Their wings and tail are dark reddish brown and their wing coverts blackish with large pale buff tips. Their throat and breast are black with a gray border that becomes reddish yellow-brown on the rest of the underparts. Adult females have upperparts like the male's but with larger white spots on the wing coverts. Their throat, breast, and belly are mostly white with a blackish scaly appearance on the upper breast. Both sexes have a black bill and pale brown legs.

== Distribution and habitat ==
The grey-bellied antbird has a disjunct distribution. It is found in Colombia in the south-central Caquetá Department and the far eastern Guainía and Vaupés departments. In Venezuela it occurs in southwestern Amazonas state, and in Brazil in extreme northwestern Amazonas state along the upper reaches of the Rio Negro. It primarily inhabits Amazonian caatinga forest growing on white-sand soils, a biome characterized by tall trees and a sparse understorey. It also occurs in denser forest with concentrations of bromeliads on white sand and in the ecotone between the caatinga and igapó (seasonally flooded) forest. In elevation it is found only as high as 400 m (1,300 ft) above sea level.

== Behavior ==
=== Movement ===
The grey-bellied antbird is believed to be a year-round resident throughout its range.

=== Feeding ===
The grey-bellied antbird feeds on arthropods, especially insects and spiders. It typically forages singly, in pairs, or in family groups and does not join mixed-species feeding flocks. It forages almost exclusively on the ground though it will ascend about 0.3 m (1 ft) up fallen logs and branches. It mostly gleans prey from the surface of leaf litter or within curled dead leaves, without often flipping them about. It also takes prey from clumps of moss and sometimes by reaching or jumping to glean from leaves near the ground.

=== Breeding ===
The grey-bellied antbird's breeding season appears to include January and February, but nothing else is known about its breeding biology.

=== Vocalization ===
The grey-bellied antbird's song is a "level series of about 15 very/extr. high 'sree' notes without intervals". its call is "a short...relatively high-pitched rattling trill, declining in intensity".

== Status ==
The IUCN has assessed the grey-bellied antbird as being of Least Concern. It has a somewhat large range; its population size is not known but is believed to be stable. No immediate threats have been identified. It is considered uncommon to fairly common. Though it has specialized habitat requirements, its range and habitat are "among the least affected by human activity within South America".
