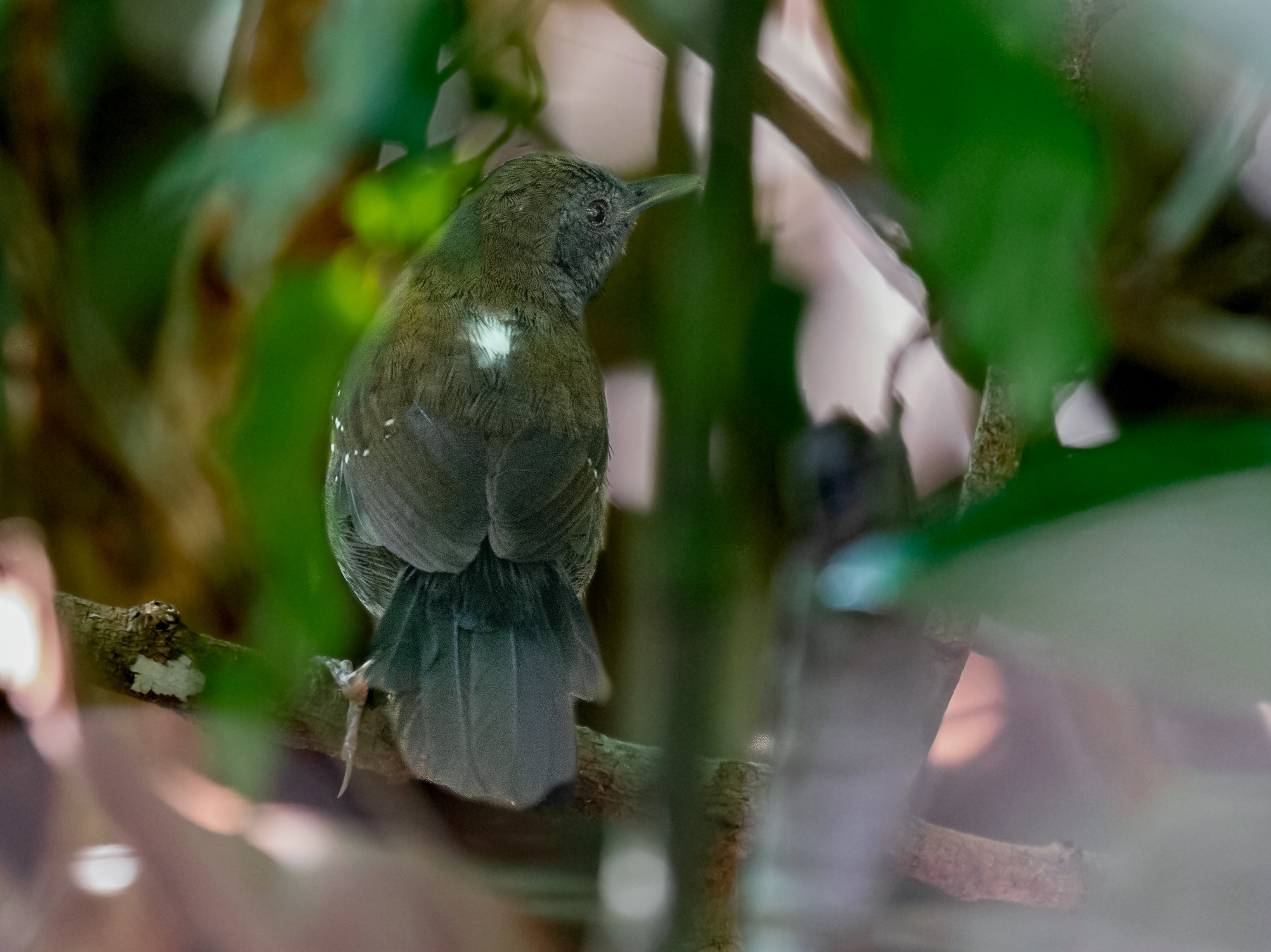
- A male at Manaus, Amazonas state, Brazil.

Conservation status
- Least Concern (IUCN 3.1)

Scientific classification
- Kingdom: Animalia
- Phylum: Chordata
- Class: Aves
- Order: Passeriformes
- Family: Thamnophilidae
- Genus: Myrmophylax; Todd, 1927
- Species: M. atrothorax

Binomial name
- Myrmophylax atrothorax (Boddaert, 1783)

Synonyms
- Myrmeciza atrothorax

= Black-throated antbird =

Species of bird

The black-throated antbird (Myrmophylax atrothorax) is a species of passerine bird in subfamily Thamnophilinae of family Thamnophilidae, the "typical antbirds". It is found in Bolivia, Brazil, Colombia, Ecuador, French Guiana, Guyana, Peru, Suriname, and Venezuela.

== Taxonomy and systematics ==
The black-throated antbird was described by the French polymath Georges-Louis Leclerc, Comte de Buffon in his Histoire Naturelle des Oiseaux in 1779. The bird was also illustrated in a hand-colored plate engraved by François-Nicolas Martinet in the Planches Enluminées D'Histoire Naturelle which was produced under the supervision of Edme-Louis Daubenton to accompany Buffon's text. Neither the plate caption nor Buffon's description included a scientific name but in 1783 the Dutch naturalist Pieter Boddaert coined the binomial name Formicarius attothorax in his catalogue of the Planches Enluminées. (The specific epithet's spelling was later corrected to atrothorax). The type locality is the city of Cayenne in French Guiana.

The black-throated antbird was usually placed in the genus Myrmeciza but a molecular phylogenetic study published in 2013 found that the genus was polyphyletic. In the resulting rearrangement to create monophyletic genera the black-throated antbird was moved to the resurrected genus Myrmophylax which had originally been introduced by the American ornithologist W. E. Clyde Todd in 1927. The generic name Myrmophylax combines the Ancient Greek murmos meaning "ant" and phulax meaning "watcher" or "observer". The specific epithet atrothorax is from the Latin ater meaning "black" and thorax meaning "breast".

The black-throated antbird is the only member of its genus. It has these five subspecies:

- M. a. metae (Meyer de Schauensee, 1947)
- M. a. atrothorax (Boddaert, 1783)
- M. a. tenebrosa (Zimmer, JT, 1932)
- M. a. maynana (Taczanowski, 1882)
- M. a. melanura (Ménétries, 1835)

Three additional subspecies have been proposed but they are considered color morphs of M. a. melanura.

== Description ==
The black-throated antbird is 13 to 14 cm (5.1 to 5.5 in) long and weighs 14 to 18 g (0.49 to 0.63 oz). Adult males of the nominate subspecies M. a. atrothorax have a gray face. Their crown and upperparts are dark yellowish olive-brown that becomes blackish on the rump, with a white patch between the shoulders. Their tail is blackish gray. Their wings are dark yellowish olive-brown with black and white tips on the coverts. The center of their throat and breast are black and the rest of their underparts gray. Adult females have a dull reddish yellow-brown crown and upperparts and dark brown wings with light buff tips on the coverts. Their chin and upper throat are white. The rest of their underparts are cinnamon-rufous with dark olive-brown flanks and crissum. Both sexes have gray legs.

Subspecies M. a. metae has gray edges on the black breast feathers, giving a spotty appearance. M. a. tenebrosa has much darker upperparts than the nominate with much smaller light tips on the wing coverts. Males have blackish gray flanks and belly; females are darker all over than the nominate. M. a. maynana males have sooty gray upperparts with a faint brownish wash. M. a. melanura is quite variable in its differences from the nominate. In most areas males have a grayer forecrown and supercilium, an olive or light russet-brown rump, sooty gray uppertail coverts, and a paler belly. Females have a white belly. The both sexes in the population in eastern Peru and western Brazil have darker underparts, and males are mostly black below. Males in the lower Rio Tapajós basin of eastern Brazil have white spots on the black breast.

== Distribution and habitat ==
The subspecies of the black-throated antbird are found thus:

- M. a. metae: central Colombia's Meta and Guaviare departments
- M. a. atrothorax: southern Venezuela, extreme east-central Colombia, the Guianas, and northern Brazil from the Rio Negro east to Amapá state
- M. a. tenebrosa: north of the Amazon in eastern Ecuador, northeastern Peru, and northern Brazil east to the Rio Negro
- M. a. maynana: north-central Peru south of the Rio Marañón
- M. a. melanura: south of the Amazon in eastern Peru, northern and central Bolivia, and locally in western and central Brazil east to Mato Grosso state

The black-throated antbird inhabits a variety of landscapes, many of which are closely associated with water. It much of its range it occurs in lowland terra firme, transitional, várzea, and igapó evergreen forest. It greatly favors forest edges, swampy areas along rivers, and regrowing clearings within forest. Along the upper rios Negro and Orinoco it tends to be in wet areas within savanna woodlands on white sand soils. In Peru and Bolivia it often associates with stands of Gynerium cane and Guadua bamboo. In all habitats it stays in the understorey.

== Behavior ==
=== Movement ===
The black-throated antbird is believed to be a year-round resident throughout its range.

=== Feeding ===
The black-throated antbird feeds on arthropods, especially insects and spiders. It typically forages singly, in pairs, or in family groups and almost never joins mixed-species feeding flocks. It forages almost exclusively within 1 m (3 ft) of the ground though it will go as high as 3 m (10 ft). It mostly gleans prey from the surface of live vegetation, branches and vines while perched or standing, and by probing leaf litter and curled dead leaves usually without flipping them about. It also takes prey by reaching or jumping to glean from low-hanging leaves. It only rarely follows army ant swarms.

=== Breeding ===
The black-throated antbird's nesting season has not been fully described but appears to vary geographically. One nest was a cup made of dead leaves lined with softer fibers placed in a clump of sedge low over water. It contained one nestling that was being fed by both parents. Nothing else is known about the species' breeding biology.

=== Vocalization ===
The black-throated antbird's song is a "very high, slightly decelerating series of 4-8 very sharp 'chee' notes, starting with a stuttered 'tutu', then slightly rising in strength and in pitch, together as 'tutu-chee-cheé- -' ". Its calls include a "sharply downslurred...note" and a "mixture of abrupt 'chit' notes given in short bursts mixed with moderately long...flat whistles".

== Status ==
The IUCN has assessed the black-throated antbird as being of Least Concern. It has an extremely large range, and though its population size is not known it is believed to be stable. No immediate threats have been identified. It is considered fairly common in most of its range though locally common in Colombia and "scarce and local" in Ecuador. It occurs in protected areas in most of the countries it inhabits, and "[i]ts ability to occupy a variety of secondary and edge habitats renders it less vulnerable to disturbance than are most other thamnophilids".
