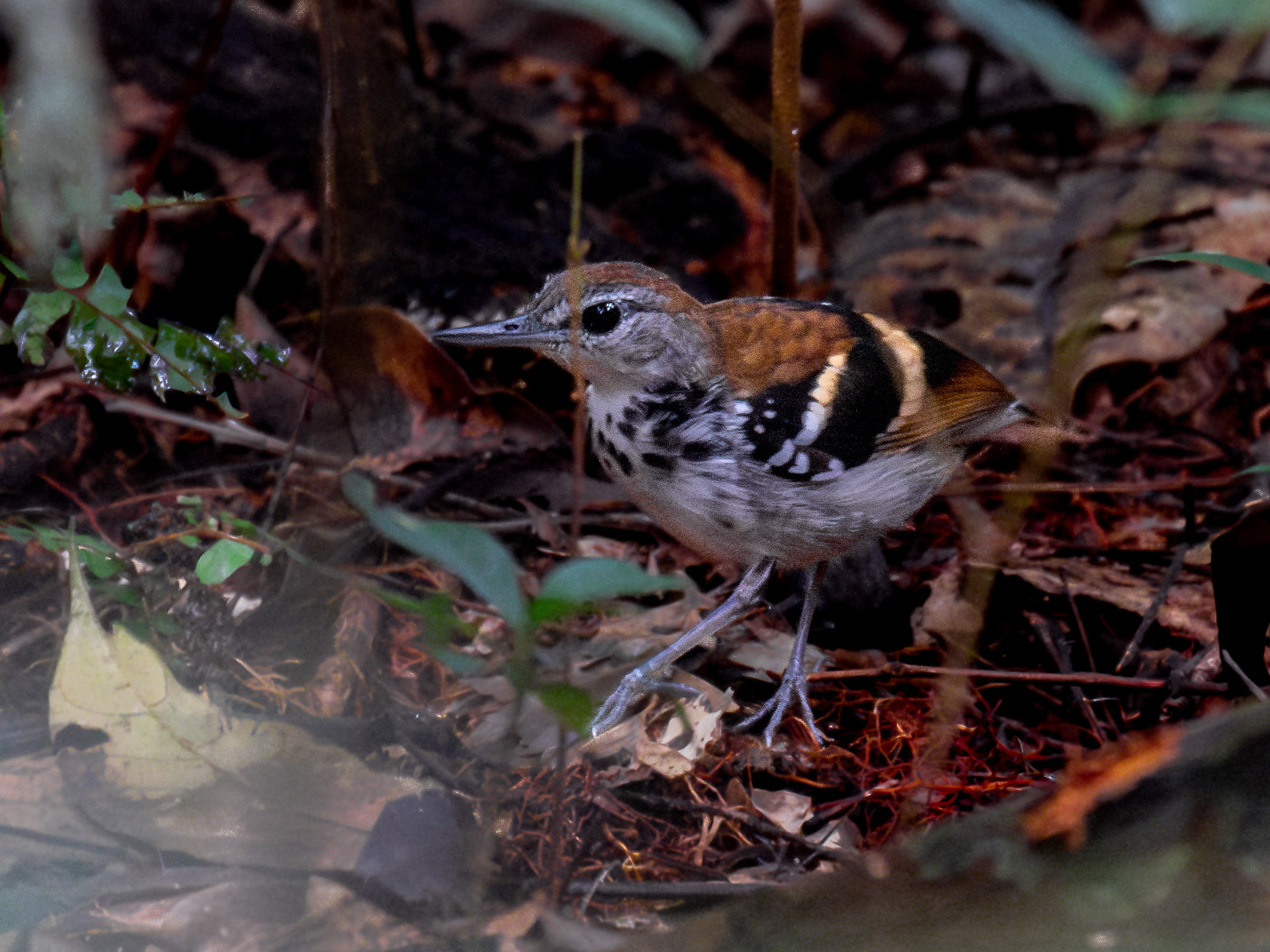
- A banded antbird at Porto Velho, Rondônia, Brazil.

Conservation status
- Least Concern (IUCN 3.1)

Scientific classification
- Kingdom: Animalia
- Phylum: Chordata
- Class: Aves
- Order: Passeriformes
- Family: Thamnophilidae
- Genus: Dichrozona; Ridgway, 1888
- Species: D. cincta

Binomial name
- Dichrozona cincta (Pelzeln, 1868)

Synonyms
- Cyphorhinus (Microcerculus) cinctus Pelzeln, 1868; Hypocnemis stellata Sclater & Salvin, 1880; Dichrozona zononota Ridgway, 1888; Dichrozona zonota Riker & Chapman, 1891; Dichrozona cincta Hellmayr, 1903; Dichrozona cinctus Chapman, 1917; Microcerculus cinctus Ihering, 1905

= Banded antbird =

Species of bird

The banded antbird (Dichrozona cincta) – sometimes called banded antwren despite not being close to the true antwrens – is a species of bird in subfamily Thamnophilinae of family Thamnophilidae, the "typical antbirds". It is found in Bolivia, Brazil, Colombia, Ecuador, Peru, and Venezuela.

== Taxonomy and systematics ==
The banded antbird was described by the Austrian ornithologist August von Pelzeln in 1868 and given the scientific name Cyphorhinus (Microcerculus) cinctus. The present genus Dichrozona was erected by the American ornithologist Robert Ridgway in 1888.

The banded antbird has had many scientific names between its first description and the present, and its taxonomy remains unsettled. The International Ornithological Committee assigns it three subspecies, the nominate D. c. cincta (Pelzeln, 1868), D. c. stellata (Sclater, PL & Salvin, 1880), and D. c. zononota (Ridgway, 1888). The Clements taxonomy and BirdLife International's Handbook of the Birds of the World treat it as monotypic. All agree that it is the only member of genus Dichrozona.

This article follows the three-subspecies model.

== Description ==
The banded antbird is 9 to 10 cm (3.5 to 3.9 in) long and weighs 14 to 15.5 g (0.49 to 0.55 oz). The species has a long bill and a short tail. Adult males of the nominate subspecies have a thin white supercilium and a blackish line through the eye on an otherwise grayish face. Their crown, nape, and upper back are cinnamon-brown with a white patch between the scapulars. Their lower back, rump, and uppertail coverts are banded with black, white, and gray. Their wings are black with cinnamon to chestnut edges on the flight feathers and buff to white tips on the coverts. Their tail is mostly black except for the mostly white outermost feathers. Their throat, breast, and belly are white with a band of black spots across the breast and brownish gray flanks. Adult females have a buff band on the lower back and fewer spots on buff-tinged underparts. The other two subspecies differ somewhat from the nominate and each other in the depth of their back color, the amount of gray on their flanks, and the extent of spotting on the breast.

== Distribution and habitat ==
The nominate subspecies of the banded antbird is found from east of the Andes in south-central and southeastern Colombia through extreme southwestern Venezuela into the upper Rio Negro watershed in northwestern Brazil. Subspecies D. c. stellata is found in eastern Ecuador, northern Peru, and western Brazil. Subspecies D. c. zononota is found in southern Peru, northwestern Bolivia, and west-central Brazil. The species inhabits evergreen forest, primarily terra firme away from waterways, and favors areas with an open understorey and much leaf litter. It is almost entirely terrestrial. In general it is found up to 800 m (2,600 ft) above sea level but reaches only 500 m (1,600 ft) in Colombia and 450 m (1,500 ft) in Ecuador.

== Behavior ==
=== Movement ===
The banded antbird is believed to be a year-round resident throughout its range.

=== Feeding ===
The banded antbird's diet has not been detailed but is thought to be arthropods. It mostly forages singly and sometimes in pairs, and does not join mixed-species feeding flocks. It forages almost entirely while walking on the ground, probing and flipping leaf litter. It also reaches and jumps to glean from leaves and stems.

=== Breeding ===
The banded antbird's breeding season includes November but otherwise is unknown. One nest is known; it was a cup in the fork of a bush 0.1 m (4 in) above the ground. Nothing else is known about the species' breeding biology.

=== Vocalization ===
The banded antbird's song is a "slow, gradually rising series of about 15-20 drawn-out, loud, very sharp 'tueét' notes". It sings from the ground or not far above it on a stump or downed log. Its calls include a "short whistle...sounding like "wheee-up" [and a] variable-length (e.g. 0·5–1 second) rattle".

== Status ==
The IUCN has assessed the banded antbird as being of Least Concern. It has a very large range. Its population size is not known and is believed to be decreasing. No immediate threats have been identified. It is considered uncommon and local across its range. Its range includes several large protected areas, and "there are huge areas of contiguous appropriate habitat that are not formally protected, but are under little threat of development in the near term".
