= White-backed fire-eye =

The white-backed fire-eye has been split into 3 species:

- East Amazonian fire-eye, Pyriglena leuconota
- Tapajos fire-eye, Pyriglena similis
- Western fire-eye, Pyriglena maura
