= Halcombe =

Settlement in Manawatū-Whanganui Region, New Zealand

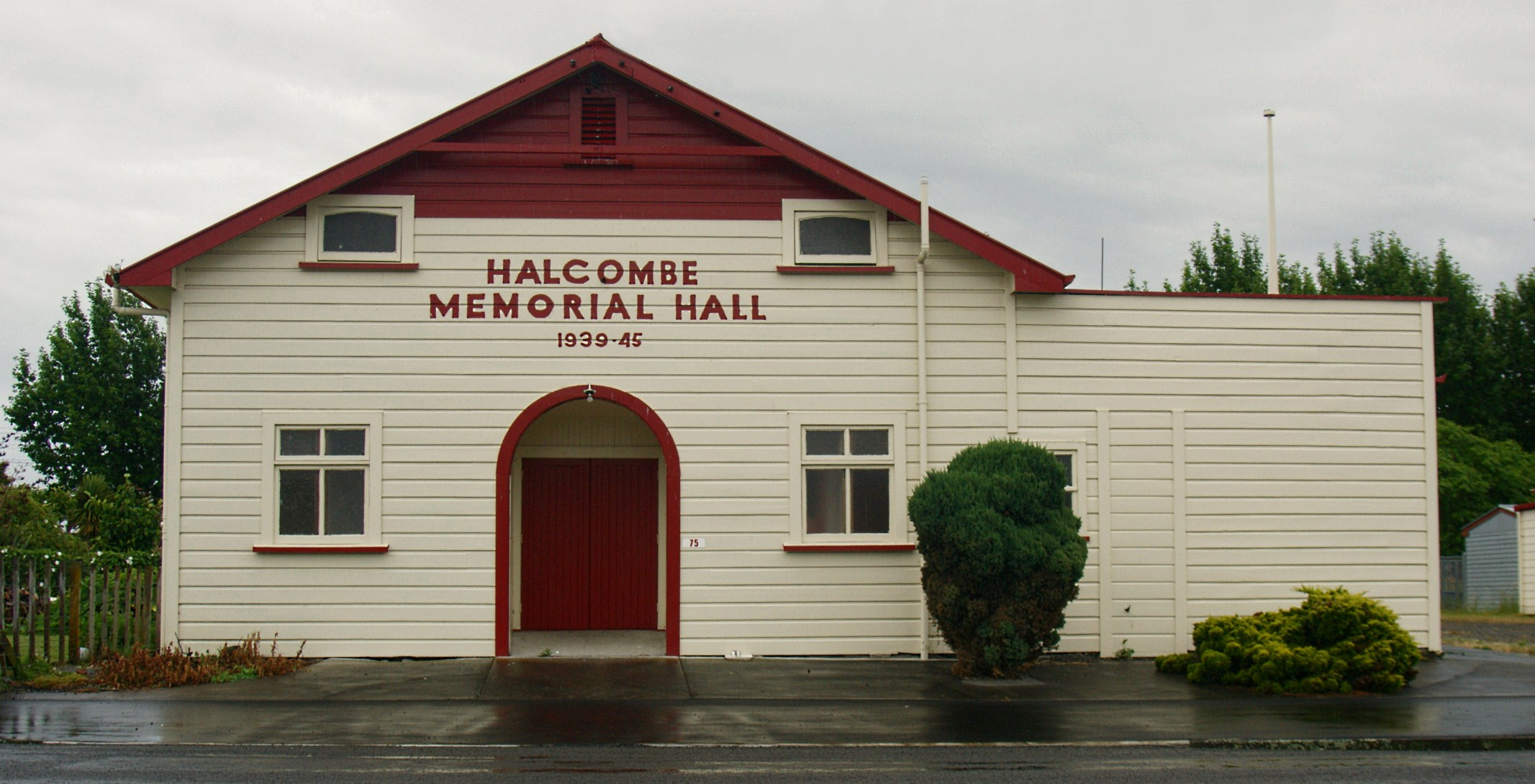
- Halcombe Memorial Hall
- Interactive map of Halcombe
- Coordinates: 40°09′S 175°30′E
- Country: New Zealand
- Region: Manawatū-Whanganui
- District: Manawatū District
- Ward: Manawatū Rural General Ward; Ngā Tapuae o Matangi Māori Ward
- Electorates: Rangitīkei; Te Tai Hauāuru (Māori)

Government
  - Territorial Authority: Manawatū District Council
  - Regional council: Horizons Regional Council
  - Mayor of Manawatu: Michael Ford
  - Rangitīkei MP: Suze Redmayne
  - Te Tai Hauāuru MP: Debbie Ngarewa-Packer

Area
  - Total: 5.18 km^{2} (2.00 sq mi)

Population (June 2025)
  - Total: 670
  - Density: 130/km^{2} (330/sq mi)

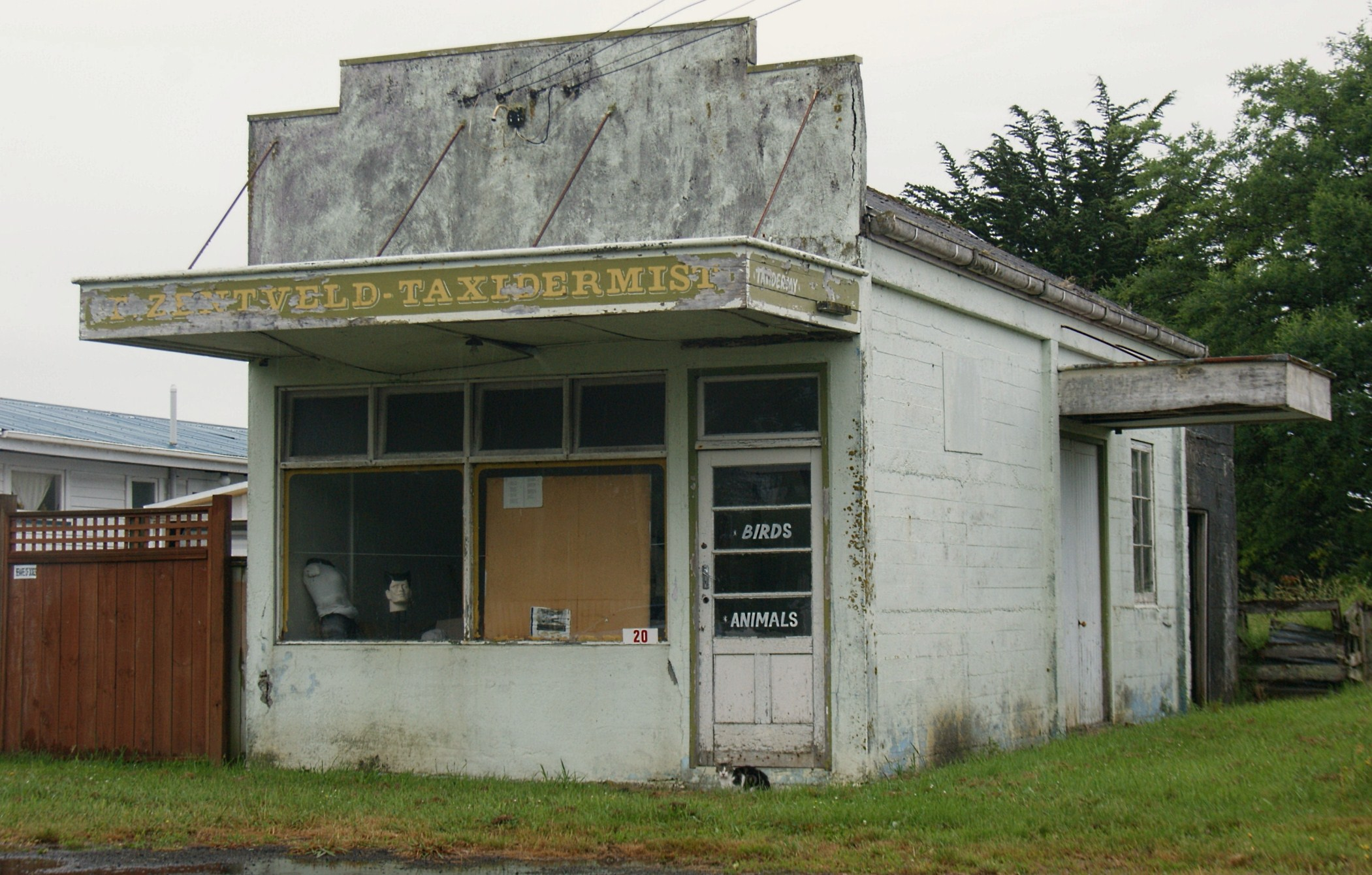
The iconic Zentveld Taxidermy building, Halcombe

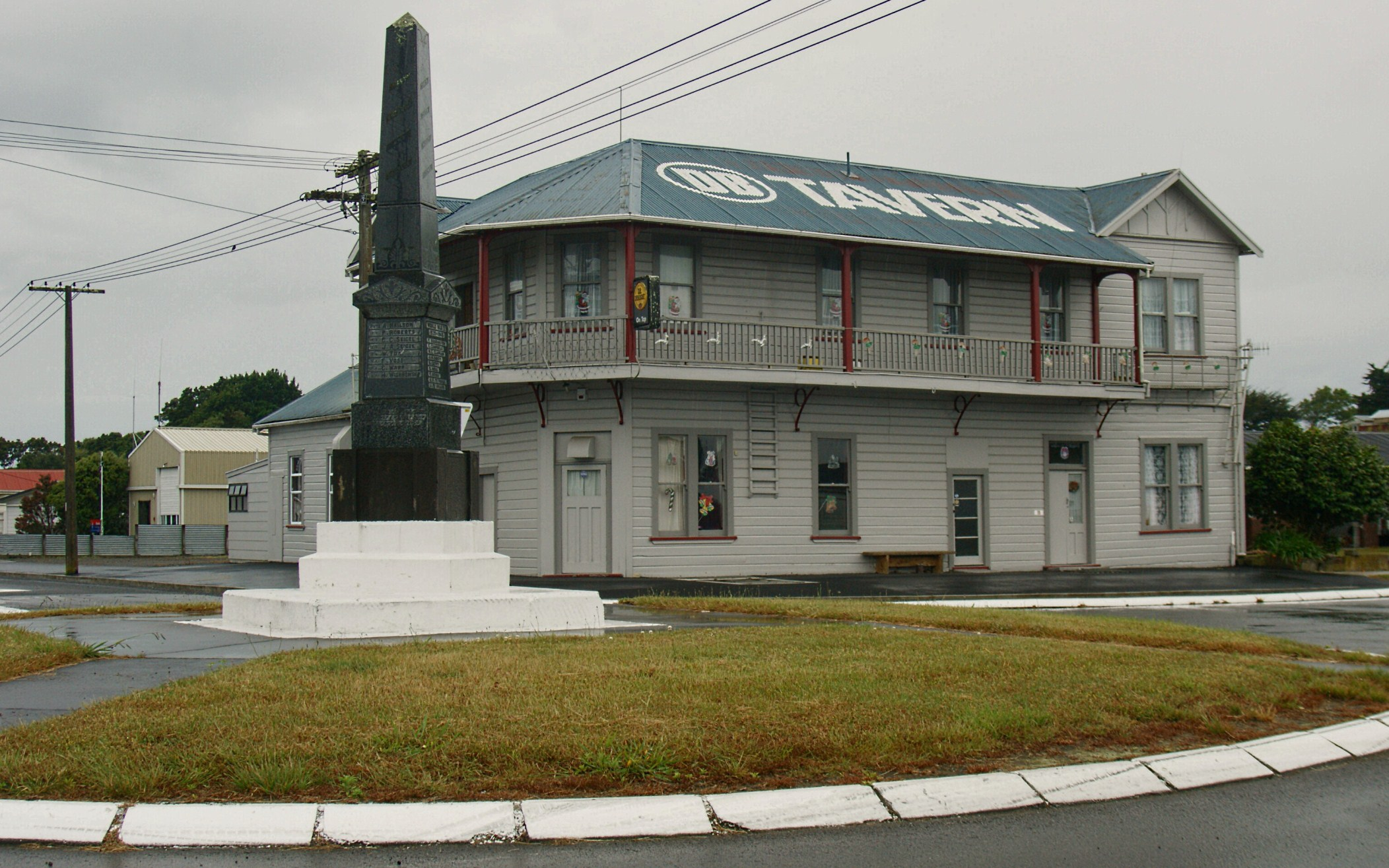
Halcombe's war memorial and "the local"

Halcombe is a small settlement in the Manawatū-Whanganui region of the North Island, New Zealand. It is situated 13 km north west of Feilding and 4 km east of the Rangitikei River, between State Highway 1 and State Highway 54.

Halcombe is situated on rolling hill country. The village centre is in a relatively low lying gully, with high hills to the west and low-lying hills to the east. The Halcombe area experiences a temperate climate which is similar to much of the Manawatu, with moderate wind and reasonable sunshine and rainfall; a good gardening climate. Frosts occur in winter, with one or two severe frosts each year due to the inland location. There are occasional fogs yearly.

The town has a pub, a public hall, a Rugby club, two tennis courts, a playground, public toilets and a rugby field. The pub featured briefly on a DB TV beer ad in the 1990s. A travelling circus large enough to own an elephant once set up on Halcombe rugby field. There is a dilapidated taxidermist's in the central area, Zentveld Taxidermy.

The North Island Main Trunk railway line runs through Halcombe, which had a station from 1878 to 1983.

== History and culture ==
=== Pre-European history ===
The area was originally settled by hapū linked to Ngāti Raukawa.

=== European settlement ===
The European settlement was established in 1876 by the immigration agent Arthur Halcombe, who lived in nearby Feilding. The town was named after him, while the nearby locality of Stanway was named for his wife, Edith Stanway Halcombe (née Swainson). An 1880 plan shows that it was intended to be much larger than the present village.

Early European settlers included British and German families, followed by Danish settlers. Immigrants were given free passage and an acre of land in the Manchester Block, to provide labour for bush-felling and road construction, with larger blocks of land being made available from 1878. A Methodist church opened in 1876, followed by a Lutheran church in 1878.

The railway reached Halcombe in 1877, connecting through to Whanganui in 1878, allowing the town to become a thriving rural centre and the main railway junction in the central North Island. By the 1880s the town had reached its population peak, with four local schools. At one point, 35 trains passed through Halcome every day.

By 1897 the town's saw-milling industry was struggling due to a shortage of logs, but the community was wealthy due to well-performing farms. The town's railway station had a combined post and telegraph office and bank, and Anglican, Presbyterian, Catholic and Lutheran Churches.

=== 20th century ===
Halcombe was intended to be the main centre of Manawatu, but an active riverbed on the Rangitikei River stopped further development. Land clearance and timer-milling gave way to farming, and the neighbouring towns of Feilding, Marton and Palmerston North took over as the main local centres.

A war memorial in the roundabout at the centre of the village commemorates the seven local men who died in World War I, and the nine local men who died in World War II.

The train station, which contained a post office and bar, burned down in 1962.

=== Marae ===
The local Tokorangi Marae and Te Tikanga meeting house is affiliated with the Ngāti Tūwharetoa hapū of Ngāti Waewae.

The area also has three Ngāti Raukawa marae:

- Te Hiiri o Mahuta Marae and meeting house are affiliated with Ngāti Matakore and Ngāti Rangatahi.
- Poupatatē Marae and meeting house are affiliated with Ngāti Pikiahuwaewae.
- Taumata o Te Rā Marae and Manomano meeting house are affiliated with Ngāti Manomano.

In October 2020, the Government committed $1,248,067 from the Provincial Growth Fund to upgrade the four Halcombe marae, as well as Kauwhata Marae and Parewahawaha Marae, creating 69 jobs.

== Demographics ==
Halcombe is described by Stats NZ as a rural settlement. It covers 5.18 km^{2} (2.00 sq mi) and had an estimated population of 670 as of June 2025, with a population density of 129 people per km^{2}. It is part of the larger Tokorangi statistical area.

Historical population for Halcombe
Year	Pop.	±% p.a.
2006	309	—
2013	399	+3.72%
2018	477	+3.64%
2023	624	+5.52%
The 2006 population is for a smaller area of 4.14 km^{2}. Source:

Halcombe had a population of 624 in the 2023 New Zealand census, an increase of 147 people (30.8%) since the 2018 census, and an increase of 225 people (56.4%) since the 2013 census. There were 306 males, 315 females, and 3 people of other genders in 225 dwellings. 1.9% of people identified as LGBTIQ+. The median age was 38.4 years (compared with 38.1 years nationally). There were 147 people (23.6%) aged under 15 years, 84 (13.5%) aged 15 to 29, 303 (48.6%) aged 30 to 64, and 90 (14.4%) aged 65 or older.

People could identify as more than one ethnicity. The results were 93.3% European (Pākehā), 15.4% Māori, 1.0% Pasifika, 1.4% Asian, and 2.9% other, which includes people giving their ethnicity as "New Zealander". English was spoken by 97.6%, Māori by 3.4%, and other languages by 2.4%. No language could be spoken by 1.9% (e.g. too young to talk). The percentage of people born overseas was 10.1, compared with 28.8% nationally.

Religious affiliations were 23.1% Christian, 1.0% Hindu, 1.0% Māori religious beliefs, 0.5% Buddhist, and 1.9% other religions. People who answered that they had no religion were 65.4%, and 7.7% of people did not answer the census question.

Of those at least 15 years old, 96 (20.1%) people had a bachelor's or higher degree, 297 (62.3%) had a post-high school certificate or diploma, and 87 (18.2%) people exclusively held high school qualifications. The median income was $44,700, compared with $41,500 nationally. 60 people (12.6%) earned over $100,000 compared to 12.1% nationally. The employment status of those at least 15 was 264 (55.3%) full-time, 75 (15.7%) part-time, and 12 (2.5%) unemployed.

=== Tokorangi statistical area ===
Tokorangi statistical area, which also covers part of Cheltenham, covers 271.52 km^{2} (104.83 sq mi) and had an estimated population of 2,600 as of June 2025, with a population density of 9.6 people per km^{2}.

Historical population for Tokorangi
Year	Pop.	±% p.a.
2006	1,698	—
2013	1,863	+1.33%
2018	2,061	+2.04%
2023	2,472	+3.70%

Tokorangi had a population of 2,472 in the 2023 New Zealand census, an increase of 411 people (19.9%) since the 2018 census, and an increase of 609 people (32.7%) since the 2013 census. There were 1,248 males, 1,218 females, and 6 people of other genders in 861 dwellings. 1.9% of people identified as LGBTIQ+. The median age was 41.5 years (compared with 38.1 years nationally). There were 522 people (21.1%) aged under 15 years, 378 (15.3%) aged 15 to 29, 1,149 (46.5%) aged 30 to 64, and 423 (17.1%) aged 65 or older.

People could identify as more than one ethnicity. The results were 88.7% European (Pākehā); 17.6% Māori; 2.1% Pasifika; 1.7% Asian; 0.2% Middle Eastern, Latin American and African New Zealanders (MELAA); and 3.2% other, which includes people giving their ethnicity as "New Zealander". English was spoken by 97.8%, Māori by 5.5%, Samoan by 0.2%, and other languages by 2.8%. No language could be spoken by 1.7% (e.g. too young to talk). New Zealand Sign Language was known by 0.5%. The percentage of people born overseas was 9.6, compared with 28.8% nationally.

Religious affiliations were 28.8% Christian, 0.4% Hindu, 1.8% Māori religious beliefs, 0.1% Buddhist, 0.2% New Age, 0.1% Jewish, and 0.8% other religions. People who answered that they had no religion were 59.1%, and 8.7% of people did not answer the census question.

Of those at least 15 years old, 411 (21.1%) people had a bachelor's or higher degree, 1,146 (58.8%) had a post-high school certificate or diploma, and 387 (19.8%) people exclusively held high school qualifications. The median income was $46,300, compared with $41,500 nationally. 255 people (13.1%) earned over $100,000 compared to 12.1% nationally. The employment status of those at least 15 was 1,077 (55.2%) full-time, 339 (17.4%) part-time, and 45 (2.3%) unemployed.

== Education ==
=== Halcombe Primary School ===
Halcombe Primary School is a co-educational state primary school, with a roll of 193 as of July 2026.

The school was established in 1880 and quickly had to be expanded. The school moved to its current location in 1941.

The school gates commemorate 15 former students who served in World War I, and ten local men who served in World War II.

=== Mt Biggs Primary School ===
Mount Biggs School, another co-educational state primary school, is located south of Halcombe. It has a roll of 110. It opened in 1921.

=== Former schools ===
Stanway School was established near Halcombe in 1882, and Tokorangi and Kakariki Schools were established nearby later in the 1880s.

All three schools were closed by the early 20th century.

== Notable people ==
- Kerri Gowler, New Zealand International rower
- Jackie Gowler, New Zealand Junior rower
- Lilian Gladys Tompkins, New Zealand nurse and prisoner of war
