= Halcombe (surname) =

Halcombe is a surname, and may refer to:

- Arthur Halcombe (1834–1900), New Zealand farmer, farm manager and immigration agent
- Edith Halcombe (1844–1903), New Zealand artist, community leader and farmer
- John Halcombe, previously called John Halcomb, (1790–1852), English lawyer and politician
- Ron Halcombe (1906–1993), Australian cricketer
