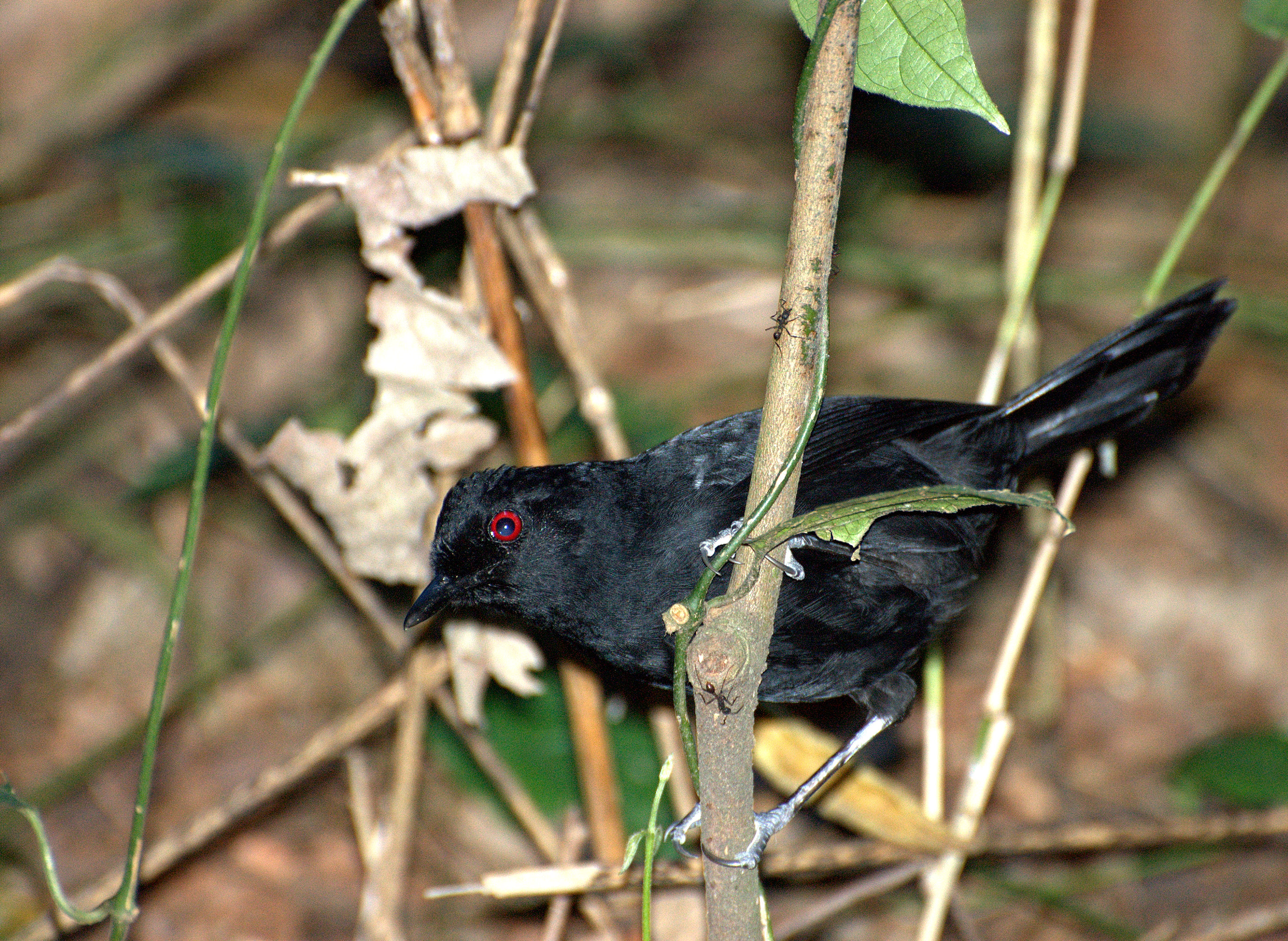
- White-shouldered fire-eye (Pyriglena leucoptera)

Scientific classification
- Kingdom: Animalia
- Phylum: Chordata
- Class: Aves
- Order: Passeriformes
- Family: Thamnophilidae
- Genus: Pyriglena; Cabanis, 1847

Type species
- Myiothera domicilla zu Wied, 1831

Species
- Western fire-eye (Pyriglena maura); Tapajos fire-eye (Pyriglena similis); Fringe-backed fire-eye (Pyriglena atra); East Amazonian fire-eye (Pyriglena leuconota); White-shouldered fire-eye Pyriglena leucoptera
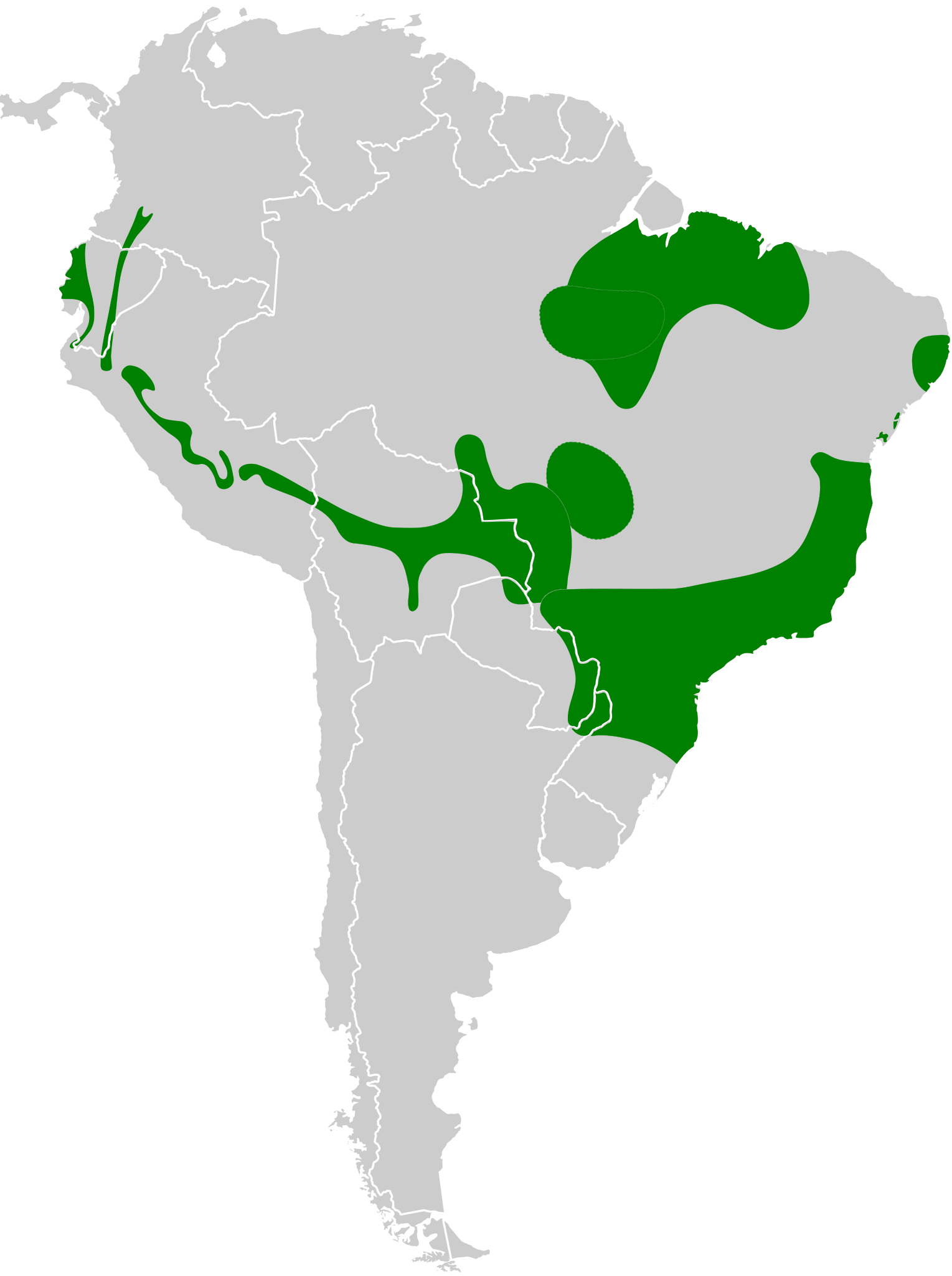
- Range of Pyriglena

= Fire-eye =

Genus of birds

The fire-eyes, Pyriglena, are a genus of birds in the antbird family Thamnophilidae introduced in 1847 by Jean Cabanis. They are relatively large for antbirds, with long tails, relatively short bills, and distinctive bright red eyes, which led to their name. There are five fire-eye species recognized, distinguished based on their plumage, displays, and vocalization. The move to recognize five distinct species from the original three was lodged before the South American Classification Committee as Proposal 759 in October 2017 and was approved on 11 February 2020. The genus is native to South America. Of the five species, one is considered endangered by the IUCN, while the others are not considered vulnerable.

== Etymology ==
The fire-eyes are so named because of their distinctive red eyes. The genus name Pyriglena comes from the Ancient Greek word puriglēnos, which means fiery-eyed. They belong to the family Thamnophilidae, or antbird, which are so named because they follow where ants swarm for purposes of foraging but are not solely reliant on them as their only food source.

== Taxonomy and systematics ==
The fire-eye antbirds belong to the genus Pyriglena which was introduced by the German ornithologist Jean Cabanis in 1847.

In 1951, only three fire-eye species were recognized: the fringe-backed fire-eye (Pyriglena atra), the white-shouldered fire-eye (Pyriglena leucoptera), both monotypic species, and the white-backed fire-eye (Pyriglena leuconota), which had ten subspecies. Scholarly articles leading up to 2013 still recognize the three species. However, it was recommended by some proponents that the genus be composed of five species, splitting the white-backed fire-eye into the East Amazonian fire-eye (Pyriglena leuconota) with three subspecies, the western fire-eye (Pyriglena maura) with six subspecies, and the monotypic Tapajos fire-eye (Pyriglena similis).

In October 2017, the proposal to recognize the five species of the genus was lodged with the South American Classification Committee (SACC). The SACC is affiliated with the International Ornithologists' Union, which is in pursuit of the global classification of birds. The SACC recognized the change on 11 February 2020 and now appears as five species in A Classification of the Bird Species of South America.

The type species is the white-shouldered fire-eye.

The five recognized species and their corresponding subspecies are as follows:

Image	Common name	Scientific name	Subspecies
	Fringe-backed fire-eye	Pyriglena atra (Swainson, 1825)	monotypic species
	White-shouldered fire-eye	Pyriglena leucoptera (Vieillot, 1818)	monotypic species
	East Amazonian fire-eye	Pyriglena leuconota (Spix, 1824)	3
	Western fire-eye	Pyriglena maura (Ménétries, 1835)	6
	Tapajos fire-eye	Pyriglena similis (Zimmer, 1931)	monotypic species

== Description, differentiation and speciation ==
=== Description ===
For antbirds, fire-eyes are generally large with long tails, relatively short bills, and distinctive bright red eyes. Both sexes are notably jet black in color with white dorsal patches and markings on their wings. Some exhibit brown color on their backs and wings, particularly the mantle, scapulars, and subterminal bands of the upper wing-coverts.

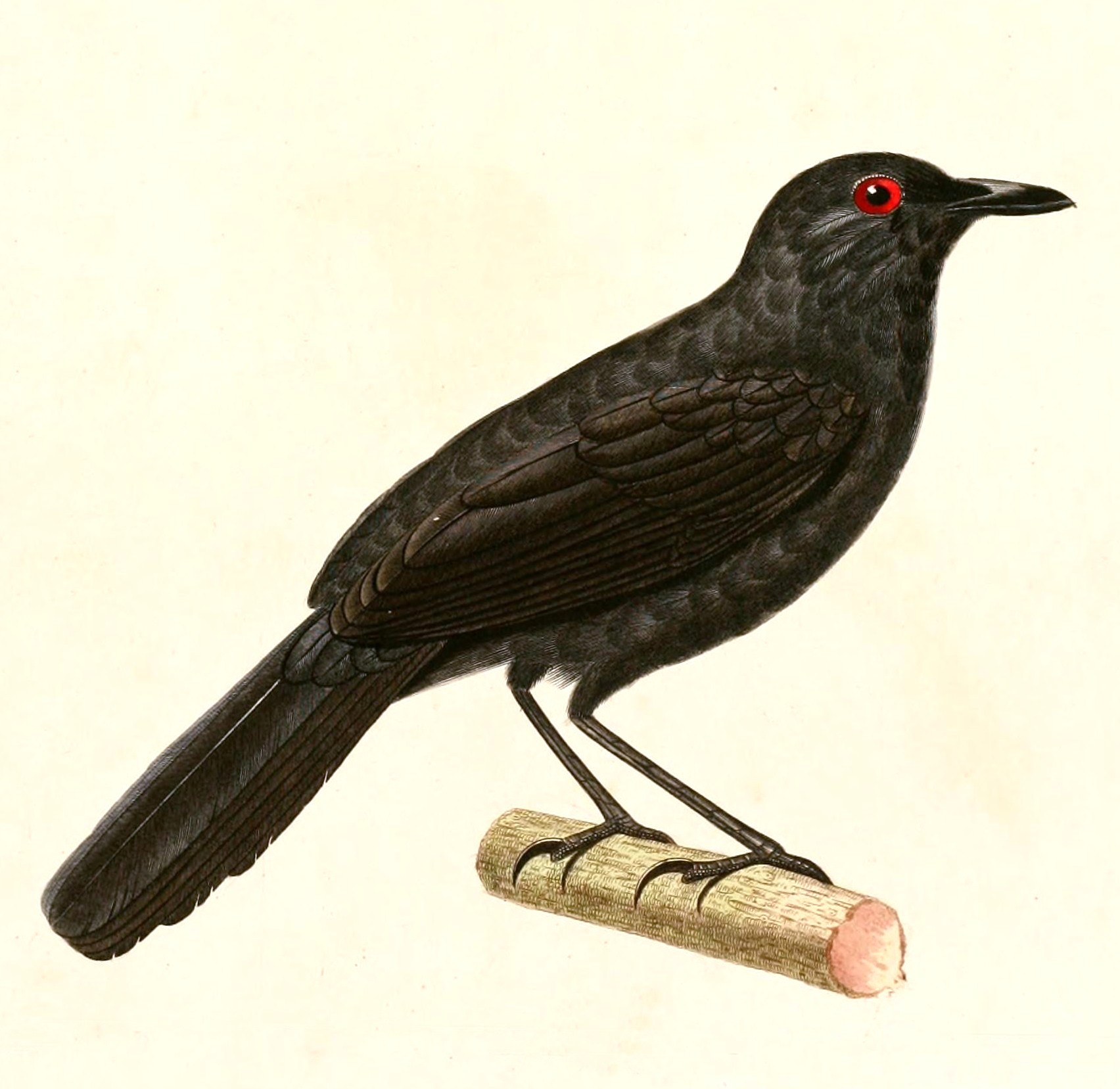
1847 illustration of Pyriglena leuconota in Voyage dans l'Amérique méridionale

=== Differentiation and speciation ===
The distinctive characteristics that indicate the differentiation and speciation of the fire-eyes are the plumage, displays, and vocalization. Plumage differences spell out the differences in species, where males of certain species exhibit white along the interscapular patch (p. leuconota), while other species have the white extend towards the fringes of the back feathers (p. atra), while others towards the wing coverts (p. leucoptera). On the other hand, females of certain species are brown with black heads (p. maura and p. similis), other species have white eyebrows (p. maura), others have a white interscapular patch (p. lueconata).

A duet of 2 pyriglenas recorded in a forest in Ecuador, circa 1983–84.

Between species, there is weak distinction in terms of plumage, but in terms of vocalization, there are clear differences. The difference is in the calls the birds make instead of the usual songs, which are similar across all Pyriglena populations with variations only in pace. It is this distinction of vocalizations that led to the proposal to classify the genus into five species instead of the earlier three. The distinctions are made across songs and the four types of calls: short calls, medium calls, long calls, and rattle calls. Calls and songs of fire-eye antbirds are used for distinct purposes: mating calls and territorial defense. Species p. leucoptera and p. atra differed from the then-considered white-backed fire-eye (p. leuconota) by three or more vocal characters, and between the two, each is distinct based on diagnostic differences in medium and short calls, supporting the classification of the three as distinct species. However, further distinctions were discovered in at least three vocal characters (short calls, rattle calls, and songs) between the populations considered among the white-backed fire-eyes hence it was proposed to distinguish and recognize p. leuconota, p. similis, and p. maura as distinct species.

== Classification ==
Citing the differences in vocalization, together with the nuances in plumage and supported by molecular based phylogeny, Proposal (759) to "Treat Pyriglena (Thamnophilidae) as consisting of five species" was lodged with the South American Classification Committee to elevate maura and similis to species rank from just being subspecies of p. leuconota. Mort Isler and Marcos Maldonado-Coelho were the proposal proponents. Several concurring opinions were raised by the SACC when they discussed the proposal in 2017. In general, members of the panel were in agreement that the recognition of the five separate species is well-supported by vocal, genetic, and plumage data, especially when comparing it with similar studies in the Thamnophilidae bird family. It is also consistent with the Isler-Whitney framework of delineating bird species. Specifically, among the arguments that support the proposal included the sufficiency in vocal and genetic data in justifying the recognition of similis, picea, and maura as distinct species. For example, female plumage and call variation (especially rattle calls) support species-level differences, which aligns with trends in other antbirds. Another is that vocal distinctions provide ample clues to determine evolutionary population divergence of birds that reside in different geographic areas. Other members of the panel welcome the proposal as an important advancement in taxonomy especially since the current taxonomy is outdated and inconsistent.

There were also some dissenting opinions raised by some members of the panel of experts in the SACC. Among the core issues raised was on vocal types (e.g., rattle calls) being shared across clades, rendering problematic the process of sorting vocalizations according to taxa. Another concern raised was on the confusion about how vocal types were defined and sorted to taxa, especially since diagnosability is unclear or undocumented. There were also concerns that a few differences are being overemphasized, while shared traits are ignored. These led some panel members to opine that the analytical approach in the study may be flawed. They called for clarity on what vocalizations were relevant for species limits, a clear rationale for the emphasis on short calls as diagnostic, and greater consistency and better analytical tools.

Proposal proponents Isler and Maldonado-Coelho addressed the SACC's concerns by agreeing that vocal characters can be inconsistent but argued that it is not relevant to the recommendation to recognize the distinct species. They pointed out that vocal evolution is often inconsistent over long periods of time, and that the study used diagnosability and phylogeny, and not just consistency. They dismissed the suggestion for other analytical methods such as multivariate statistics stating that these would not give definitive answers about the species' evolutionary divergence among different geographic locations. Instead, they emphasized focusing on suboscine vocalizations as the species' most significant distinguishing factor since these are genetic rather than learned. As published in the SACC website, Proposal 759 was approved on 11 February 2020.

== Evolutionary mechanisms ==
The population evolutionary divergence of the fire-eye antbirds has been attributed to two evolutionary theories: geographical and paleogeographical mechanisms. The first theory looked into the population divergence of the fire-eye antbirds via the geographical hypotheses on rivers and refuges. It points to rivers as the mechanism having evolutionary influence among the fire-eye antbirds. The changes over time of the Amazon draining system, which includes the Tocantins River, influenced gene flow and speciation of taxa including the fire-eyes.

The second theory points to the palaeogeographical evolutionary mechanisms of the fire-eye antbirds. In particular, the dynamics of climatic oscillations relative to the conversion of forest areas around rivers into "savanna-like vegetation" caused the divergence of populations of these birds.

== Distribution and conservation ==
The fire-eye antbirds are found to exist in the same areas in the Amazon basin of South America as their original progenitors since these birds are very territorial. While some antbirds can overcome geographical barriers, despite typically being restricted to low altitudes in the Neotropical region, such may not be the case for the fire-eye antbirds. The fire-eyes particularly inhabit the moist tropical forests in the Amazon Basin with species found in Brazil, Colombia, Peru, and Ecuador as well as in Argentina, Paraguay, and Bolivia. The white-shouldered fire-eye (p. leucoptera) is native or extant in Argentina, Brazil, and Paraguay. The fringed-back fire-eyes (p. atra) are confined in Brazil, specifically the forested areas of Salvador and coastal Santo Amaro, both in Bahia, Saubara and Crato, in Nordeste, and Sergipe. The east-Amazonian fire-eyes (p. leuconota) are mainly found in Brazil. The range of the Tapajos fire-eyes (p. simili) covers the east of the Tapajoz river bounded by the Tocantins of Amazonian Brazil. The range of the western fire-eyes (p. maura) covers Ecuador, Peru, Colombia, Bolivia, and Brazil.

East Amazon fire-eyes (p. leuconota)	White-shouldered fire-eyes (p. leucoptera)	Western fire-eyes (p. maura)	Tapajos fire-eyes (p. similis)	Fringe-backed fire-eyes (p. atra)
Range of East Amazon fire-eyes (p. leuconota)	Range of white-shouldered fire-eyes (p. leucoptera)	Range of western fire-eyes (p. maura)	Range of Tapajos fire-eyes (p. similis)	Range of fringe-backed fire-eyes (p. atra)
Brazil	Argentina, Brazil, and Paraguay.	Bolivia, Brazil, Colombia, Ecuador, Paraguay, and Peru.	Brazil	Brazil

In terms of population, as well as conservation status, the International Union for Conservation of Nature and Natural Resources (IUCN) Red List reports as assessed by BirdLife International has classified the fringe-backed fire-eye (Pyriglena atra) as an endangered species with population estimates between 1,000 and 2,499 individual birds and as such are protected under Brazilian law. On the other hand, the white-backed fire-eye (Pyriglena leuconota) and the white-shouldered fire-eye (Pyriglena leucoptera) are not considered vulnerable with population described as 'common' but declining at a rate of 15-19%. Habitat loss is the main factor for the declining population, which is more pronounced for the fringe-backed fire-eye.
