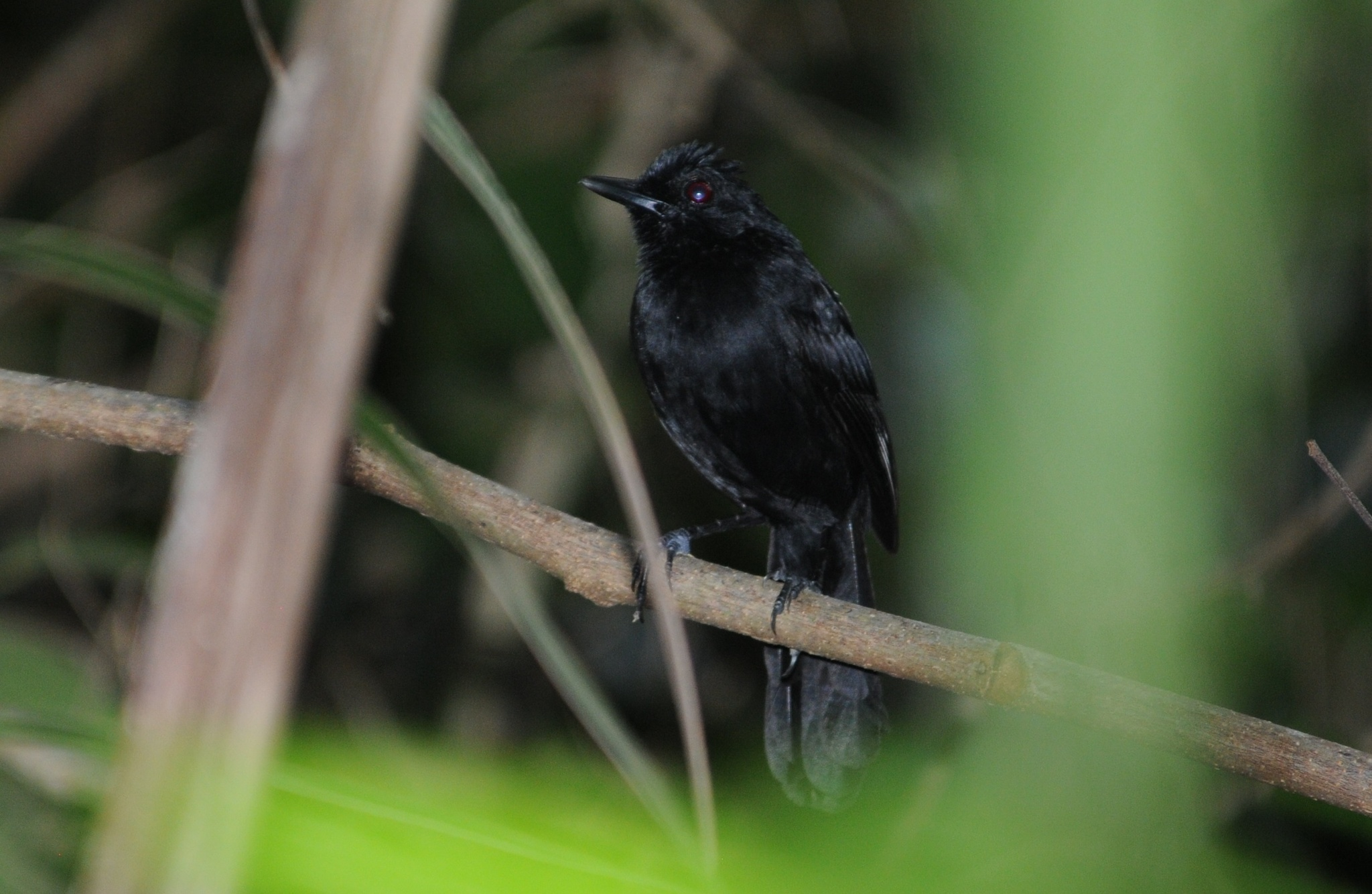

Conservation status
- Near Threatened (IUCN 3.1)

Scientific classification
- Kingdom: Animalia
- Phylum: Chordata
- Class: Aves
- Order: Passeriformes
- Family: Thamnophilidae
- Genus: Pyriglena
- Species: P. atra

Binomial name
- Pyriglena atra (Swainson, 1825)

= Fringe-backed fire-eye =

Species of bird

The fringe-backed fire-eye (Pyriglena atra), for a time known as Swainson's fire-eye, is a Near Threatened species of bird in subfamily Thamnophilinae of family Thamnophilidae, the "typical antbirds". It is endemic to Brazil. In Brazilian Portuguese it is called papa-taoca-da-bahia.

== Taxonomy and systematics ==
The fringe-backed fire-eye was described by the English naturalist William Swainson in 1825 and given the binomial name Drymophila atra. The current genus Pyriglena was introduced by the German ornithologist Jean Cabanis in 1847. The species at times has been treated as conspecific with the white-shouldered fire-eye (P. lecucoptera) and what was at the time the white-backed fire-eye (P. leuconota); the latter has since been split into several species.

The fringe-backed fire-eye is monotypic.

== Description ==
The fringe-backed fire-eye is 16 to 18 cm (6.3 to 7.1 in) long; one individual weighed 32 g (1.1 oz). Adults of both sexes have bright red irises; those of immature birds are orange. Males are mostly glossy black with a large patch of black and white feathers between their scapulars and blackish gray underwing coverts. Females have yellowish brown upperparts and wings with no interscapular patch. Their tail is brownish black. Their face is olive-tinged gray with black lores and a black line above and behind the eye. Their chin and throat are white, their breast light yellowish olive-brown, their belly a lighter olive-brown, and their flanks, crissum, and underwing coverts dark gray-tinged olive-brown.

== Distribution and habitat ==
The fringe-backed fire-eye has a very small range in eastern Brazil; it is found in southeastern Sergipe and coastal northeastern Bahia. Its range is estimated at 5,000 km^{2} (1,900 sq mi) though it occurs only patchily within it. It inhabits dense understorey vegetation in lowland evergreen forest. It mostly occurs at the edges of primary forest, in mature secondary forest, and in clearings such as those caused by fallen trees. It shuns sunlit areas such as open woodland with little undergrowth. In elevation it ranges from near sea level to about 250 m (800 ft).

== Behavior ==
=== Movement ===
The fringe-backed fire-eye is a year-round resident throughout its range.

=== Feeding ===
The fringe-backed fire-eye feeds on insects (e.g. cockroaches, grasshoppers, and winged ants), other arthropods such as spiders and centipedes, and small vertebrates such as geckos and frogs. It typically forages singly, in pairs, or in family groups in dense vegetation, mostly on the ground and within about 3 m (10 ft) above it but as high as 10 m (33 ft). It hops between short feeding stops, pumping its tail. It captures prey by gleaning, reaching, jumping (upward and to the ground), lunging from a perch, and by tossing aside leaf litter on the ground. Much less frequently it makes short sallies to glean or capture prey on the wing. It frequently follows army ant swarms to capture prey disturbed by the ants, and several family groups may congregate at a swarm. It sometimes joins mixed-species feeding flocks.

=== Breeding ===
The fringe-backed fire-eye's breeding season is not fully known but includes November and December. The first nest to be described was a ball of dry leaves lined with palm fibers. It was on the ground and surrounded and partially covered with dry leaves. When found it contained two eggs. Their incubation period was at least 18 days and the chicks fledged 13 days after hatch. Both parents incubated the clutch during the day and the female alone at night. Both parents brooded and provisioned the nestlings.

=== Vocalization ===
The fringe-backed fire-eye's song is a "hurried, descending series of about 6 'peeh---' notes". Its call is a "very high, piped 'peek' ".

== Status ==
The IUCN originally in 1988 assessed the fringe-backed fire-eye as Threatened, then in 1994 as Endangered, in 2000 as Critically Endangered, and between 2004 – 2025 again as Endangered. As of 2025, it has been downlisted to Near Threatened, due to its occurrence over several sites within its small range and new data indicating its population is not particularly fragmented. Its population size is unknown, but believed to be decreasing. The United States Fish and Wildlife Service listed it as an endangered species in 2010. It is considered Endangered under Brazilian law.
