= Lilian Gladys Tompkins =

- Born: 1893; Halcombe, Manawatu/Horowhenua, New Zealand
- Died: 1984 (aged 90–91)
- Occupation: Nurse
- Known for: Prisoner of war during World War II

Lilian Gladys Tompkins (1893–1984) was a notable New Zealand nurse and prisoner of war. She was born in Halcombe, Manawatu/Horowhenua, New Zealand in 1893.
