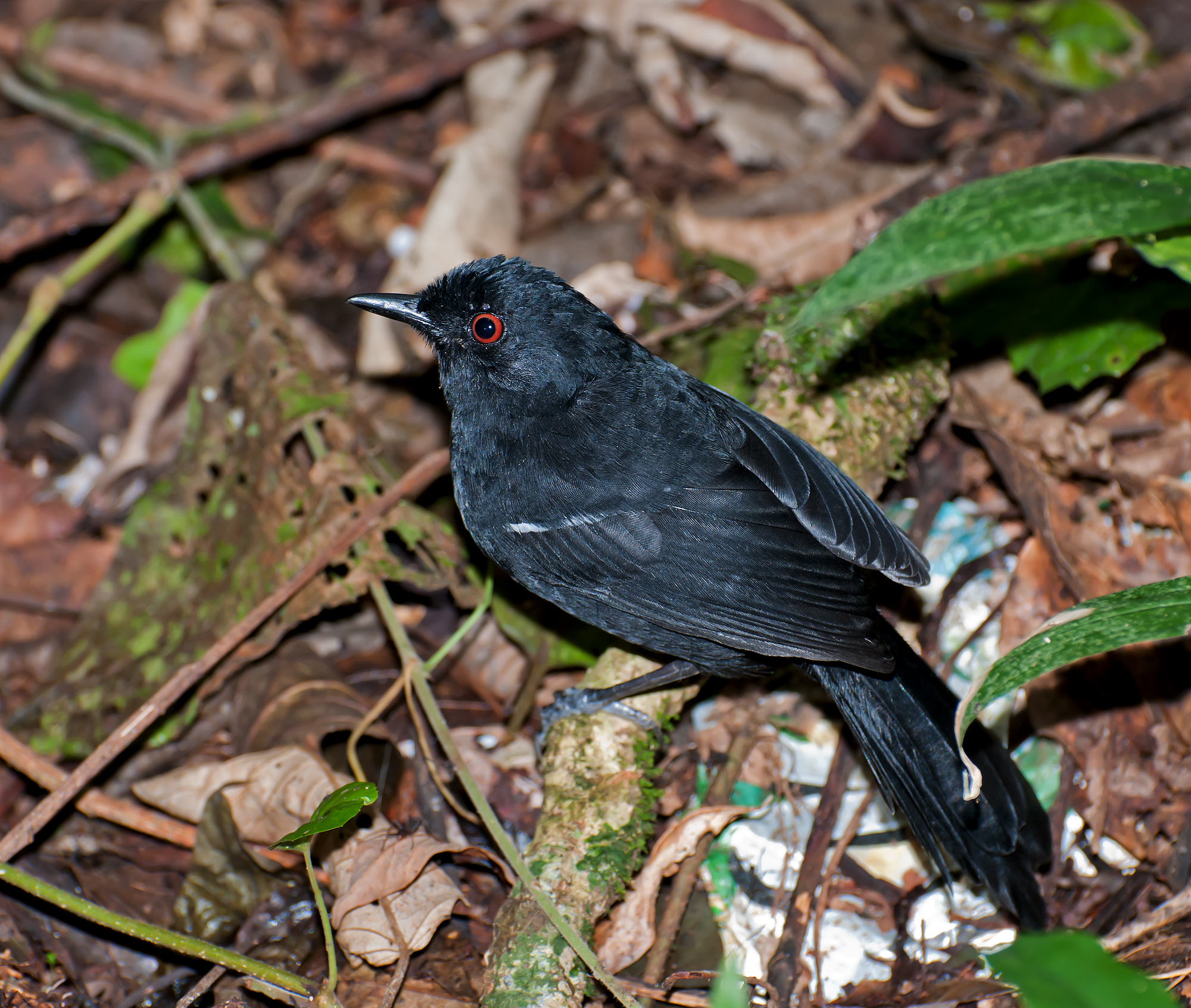
- Male in São Paulo, Brazil

Conservation status
- Least Concern (IUCN 3.1)

Scientific classification
- Kingdom: Animalia
- Phylum: Chordata
- Class: Aves
- Order: Passeriformes
- Family: Thamnophilidae
- Genus: Pyriglena
- Species: P. leucoptera

Binomial name
- Pyriglena leucoptera (Vieillot, 1818)

= White-shouldered fire-eye =

Species of bird

The white-shouldered fire-eye (Pyriglena leucoptera) is a species of bird in subfamily Thamnophilinae of family Thamnophilidae, the "typical antbirds". It is found in Argentina, Brazil, and Paraguay.

== Taxonomy and systematics ==
The white-shouldered fire-eye was described by the French ornithologist Louis Pierre Vieillot in 1818 and given the binomial name Turdus leucopterus. The specific name is from the Ancient Greek leukopteros meaning "white-winged". The current genus Pyriglena was introduced by the German ornithologist Jean Cabanis in 1847. The species at times has been treated as conspecific with the fringe-backed fire-eye (P. atra) and what was at the time the white-backed fire-eye (P. leuconota); the latter has since been split into several species.

The white-shouldered fire-eye is monotypic.

== Description ==
The white-shouldered fire-eye is 16 to 18 cm (6.3 to 7.1 in) long and weighs 25 to 34 g (0.88 to 1.2 oz). Adults of both sexes have bright red irises. Males are mostly glossy black. They have a white patch between their scapulars, white lesser wing coverts, white-tipped median and greater wing coverts, and blackish gray underwing coverts. Females have yellowish brown to chestnut crown, upperparts, and wings with no interscapular patch. Their tail is brownish black. Their face is olive-tinged gray with black lores. Their chin and throat are white, their breast light yellowish olive-brown, their belly a whiter olive-brown, and their flanks, crissum, and underwing coverts dark gray-tinged olive-brown.

== Distribution and habitat ==
The white-shouldered fire-eye is found in eastern Brazil from eastern Bahia and southwestern Minas Gerais south to Mato Grosso do Sul and extreme northern Rio Grande do Sul, in eastern Paraguay from Canindeyú to Itapúa, and in extreme northeastern Argentina's Misiones Province. It inhabits dense understorey vegetation in lowland evergreen forest. It mostly occurs at the edges of primary forest, in mature secondary forest, and in clearings such as those caused by fallen trees. It also occurs in selectively logged forest and in plantations. It favors areas with dense thickets, vine tangles, and large stands of bamboo. It shuns sunlit areas such as open woodland with little undergrowth. In elevation it ranges from near sea level to about 1,300 m (4,300 ft).

== Behavior ==
=== Movement ===
The white-shouldered fire-eye is believed to be a year-round resident throughout its range.

=== Feeding ===
The white-shouldered fire-eye feeds on insects (e.g. cockroaches, beetles, and ants), other arthropods such as spiders, and small vertebrates such as geckos. It typically forages singly, in pairs, or in family groups in dense vegetation, mostly on the ground and within about 3 m (10 ft) above it but as high as 10 m (33 ft). It hops between short feeding stops, pumping its tail. It captures prey by gleaning, reaching, jumping (upward and to the ground), lunging from a perch, and by searching leaf litter on the ground. Much less frequently it makes short sallies to glean or capture prey on the wing. It frequently follows army ant swarms to capture prey disturbed by the ants. It sometimes briefly joins mixed-species feeding flocks.

=== Breeding ===
The white-shouldered fire-eye's breeding season spans from September to December. One nest was found in October in Argentina. It was a ball made of leaves, leaf petioles, and bamboo sheaths on the ground in a dense bamboo stand. It had a short upward facing tunnel entrance and contained two eggs which were white with rufous and chestnut markings. Both parents incubated the clutch during the day. Other nests found in Brazil were of similar shape, constructed of similar materials, and placed on the ground or a low stump. The incubation period, time to fledging, and other details of parental care are not known.

=== Vocalization ===
The male white-shouldered fire-eye's song is a "slow, short series of about 5 descending, fluted notes". Females sing a similar song that descends more. One call is a "very high, chipping 'tjew tjew -' "; others are a "low-pitched 'chup' ", a "higher and longer 'cheep' ", and a "musical bubbling rattle".

== Status ==
The IUCN has assessed the white-shouldered fire-eye as being of Least Concern. Its population size is not known and is believed to be decreasing. No immediate threats have been identified. Its range includes many protected areas. "[S]ome populations may be endangered at local level as a result of rapid clearance of forest for agriculture. On other hand, survives well in selectively logged forest, and appears to colonize eucalyptus (Eucalyptus) plantations readily, especially if these contain an understorey of native plants."
