= Isaac Swainson =

British botanist and herbalist (1746–1812)

Isaac Swainson (1746–1812) was famous for his botanical garden, which was largely funded from the profits of a herbal remedy for venereal disease. For his commercial activities in the latter field, he has been called a "radical quack". He was a relative of William Swainson, the zoologist, and of Charles Swainson (naturalist). A plant genus is named after him. A biography has been recently produced

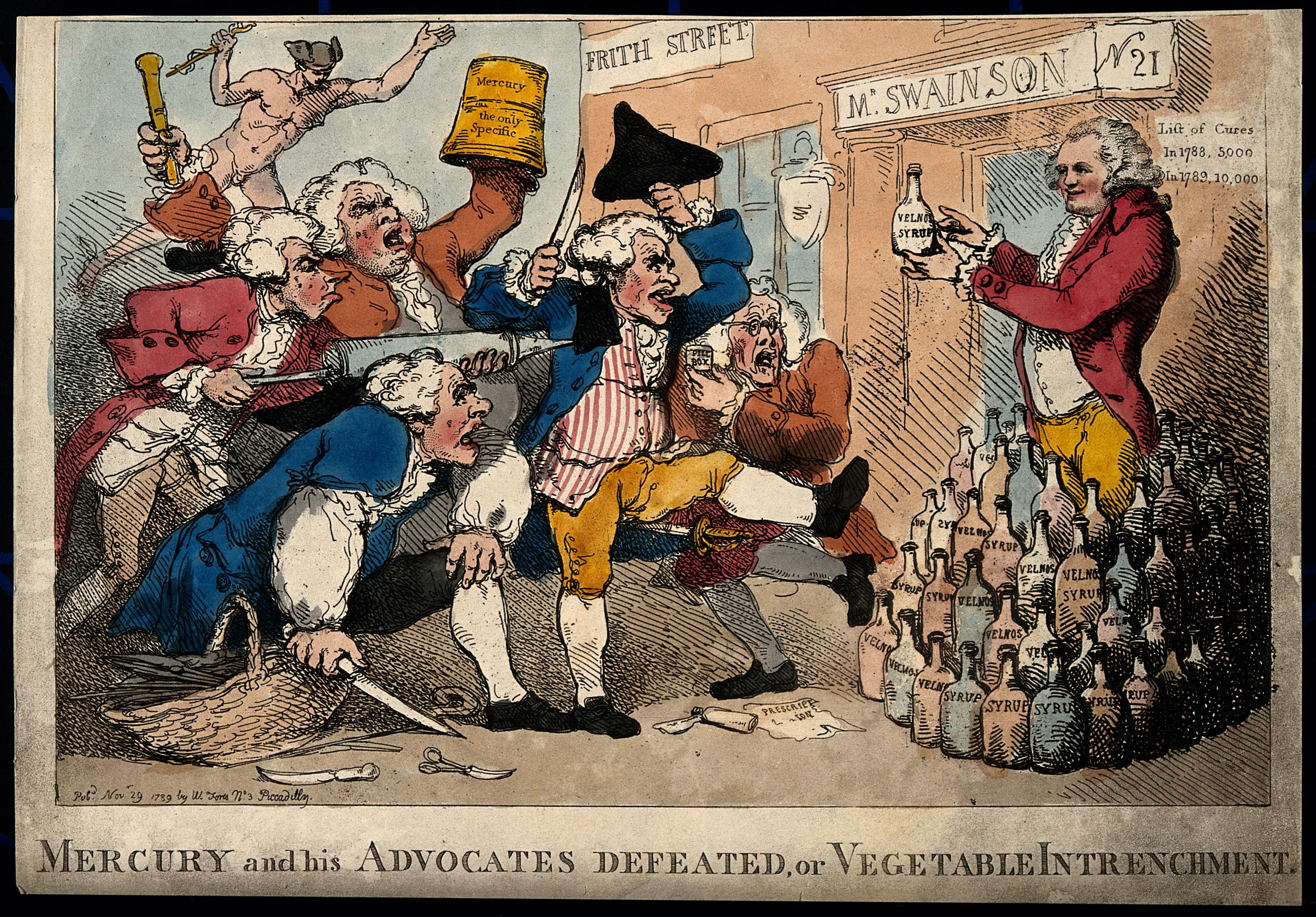
Isaac Swainson promoting his 'Velnos syrup', facing an onslaught of rival practitioners advocating mercury. Wellcome V0010912

== Velnos' Vegetable Syrup ==
Swainson moved to London where he served as assistant to a Dr. Mercier in Frith Street, Soho, where he settled. Later, he purchased from Mercier the recipe of a patent medicine called "Velnos' Vegetable Syrup", named after Vergery de Velnos. This was one of many cures for venereal diseases based on plants rather than mercury, which is toxic. The brand became well-known and Swainson reputedly made as much as £5,000 a year from its sales. In addition to curing venereal diseases, including "the pox" and the "French disease", it was claimed to cure leprosy gout, scrophula, dropsy, small pox, consumption, tape worms, cancer, scurvy, and diarrhea.

Swainson also studied the conventional medicine of the era and gained an MD in 1785. There is no record of his subsequent election to the Royal College of Physicians. Swainton died on 7 February 1812 in Soho. His funeral was at St Mary's Church, Twickenham, and he was buried at Holly Road Garden of Rest.

== Sturt's desert pea ==
Swainson, who was less noted for botany, is honoured by the genus name Swainsona, which is now known as the emblem of South Australia. Its common name is Sturt's desert pea.

== Publications ==
- Directions for the use of Velnos' Vegetable Syrup (1790)
- An Account of Cures by Velnos' Vegetable Syrup (1792)
