= Holly Road Garden of Rest =

Former cemetery in Twickenham, now a garden

Coordinates: 51.4468°N 0.3296°W

Holly Road Garden of Rest is a former cemetery in Twickenham, London Borough of Richmond upon Thames, that was converted to a public garden in 1953.

It was established in 1782 as a burial ground for St Mary the Virgin, Twickenham, but by 1835 was almost full and was closed in 1868, although some later burials took place. In 1930 a record was made of the inscriptions on the 196 tombstones and monuments, recording about 450 names.

The headstones have been moved against the outside walls, with a play area for younger children. The garden was restored and re-planned in 1991 with a plaque installed. The iron railings were restored in 1995. In 2013 new benches and tables were added, with a new ornate gate.

== Notable burials ==
- Robert Burt (1757–1791) vicar of Twickenham, who conducted George IV's marriage to Mrs Fitzherbert in 1785
- James Durand (d 1766), British Army officer
- Sir William Howe (1729–1814) and his wife Frances, daughter of Lady Anne Connolly of Twickenham, who are buried beside each other. Howe was a professional soldier who was Commander-in-Chief of the British Army during the first part of the American War of Independence.
- Edward Ironside (1736–1803), historian of Twickenham, and his wife
- Charles Morton FRS (1716–1799), a medical doctor and librarian who became the principal librarian of the British Museum
- Isaac Swainson (1746–1812) who lived at Heath Lane Lodge where he established a botanic garden; Swainsona was named after him. He practised as a physician in Frith Street, Soho, where he sold "Velnos' Vegetable Syrup", a herbal remedy for venereal disease and other ailments.
- Thomas Twining (1776–1861) and other members of the Twining family

== Gallery ==
Holly Road Garden of Rest
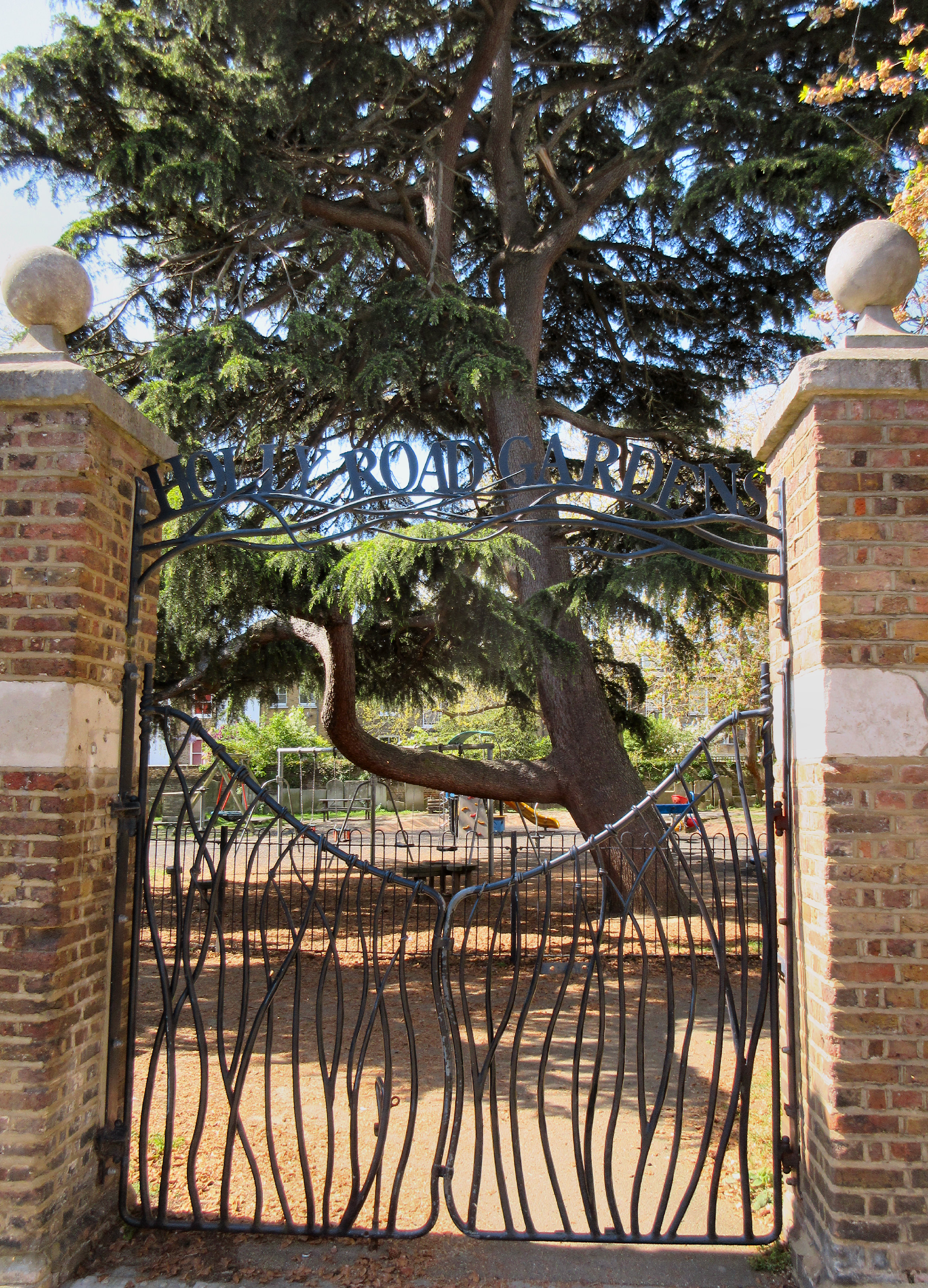
The gates

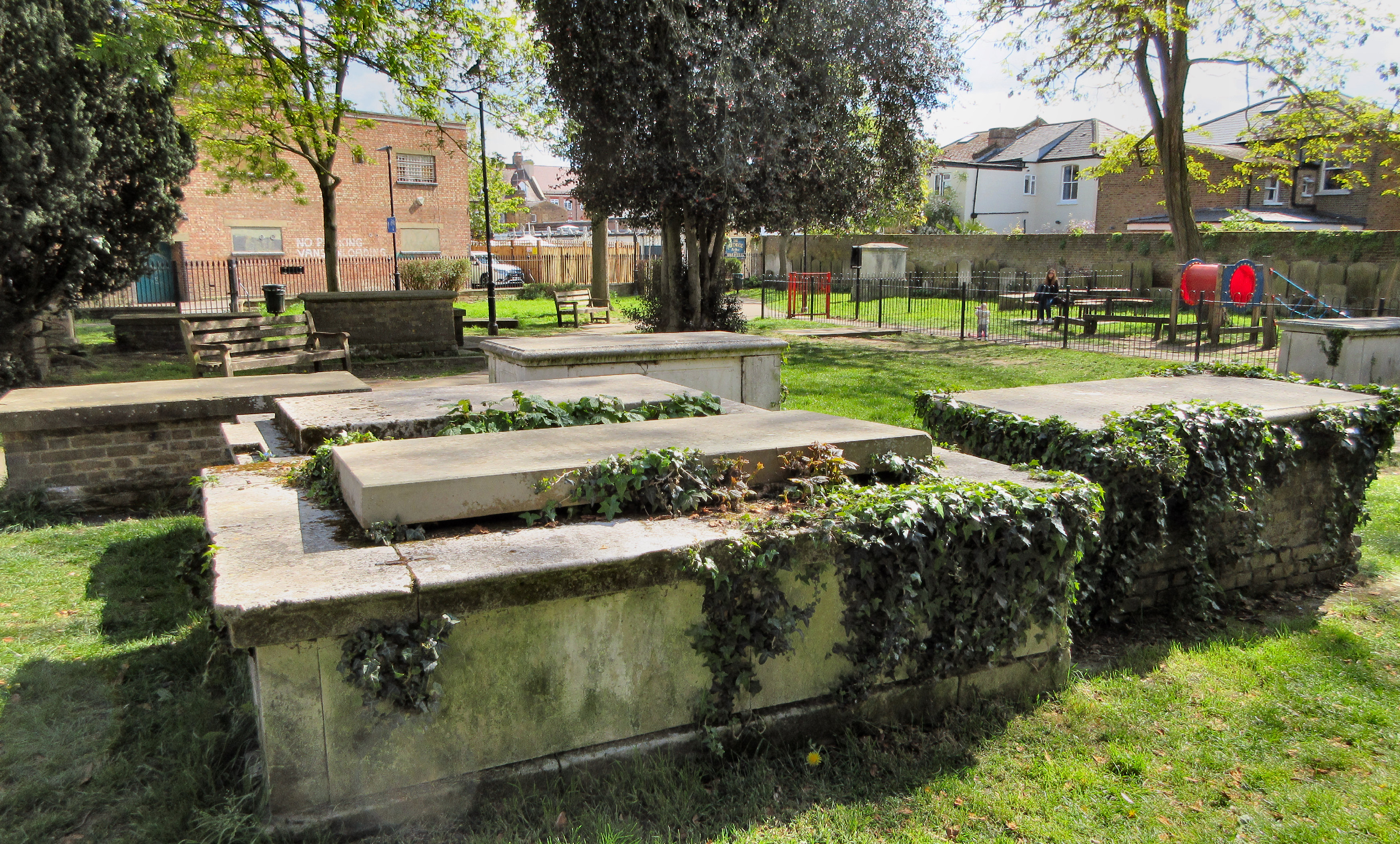
Holly Road Garden of Rest

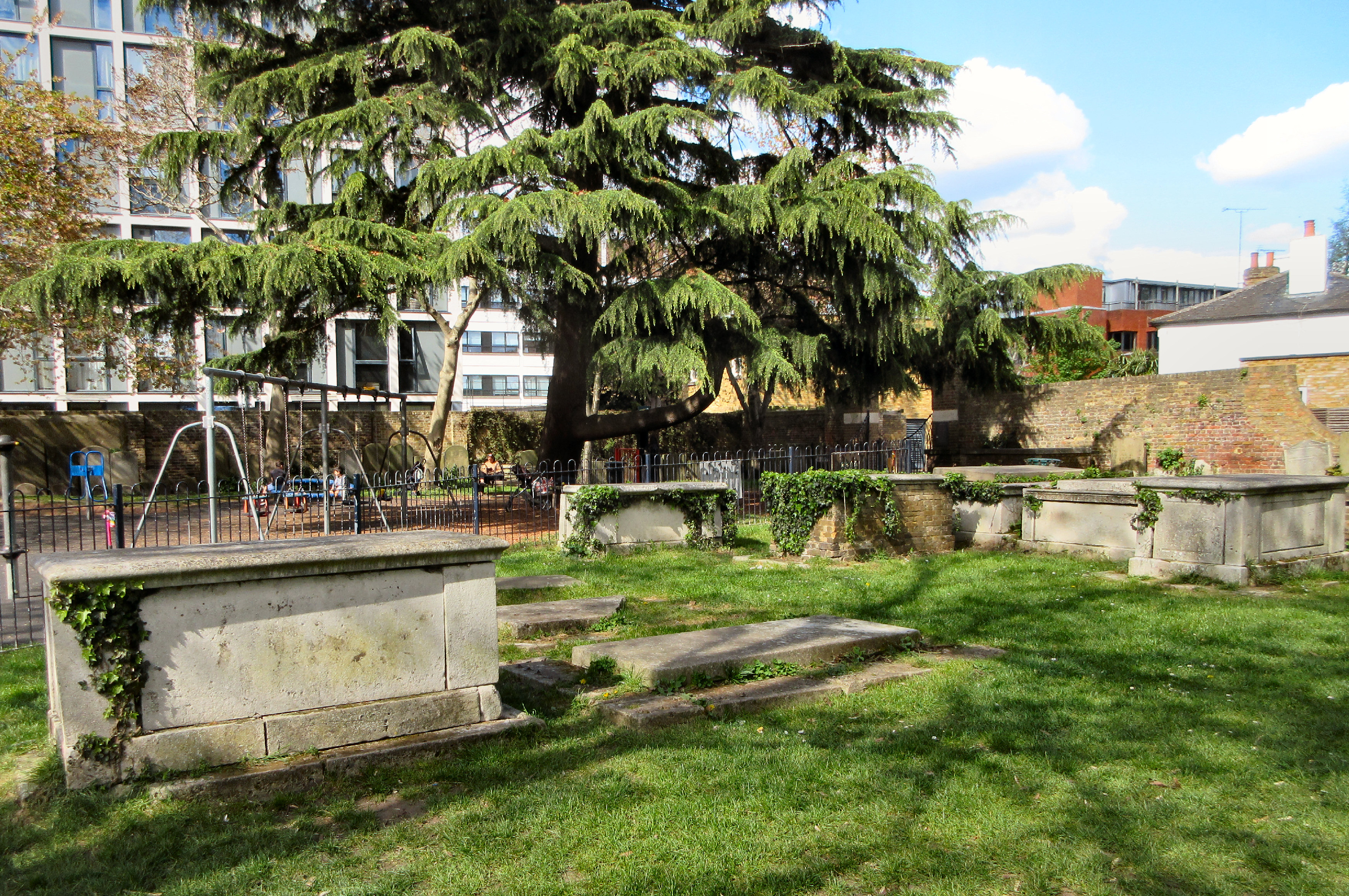
Holly Road Garden of Rest

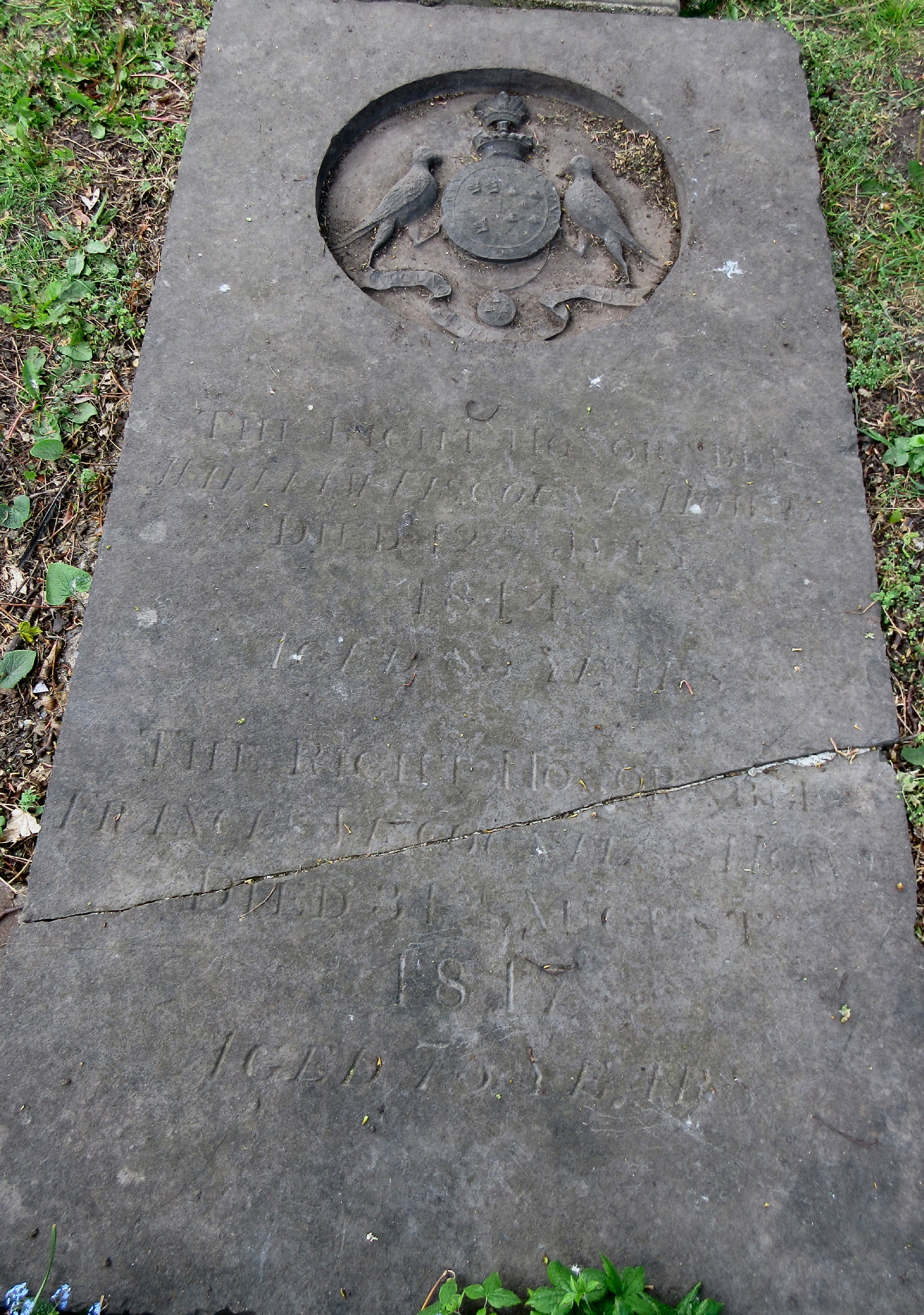
Tomb of Sir William Howe

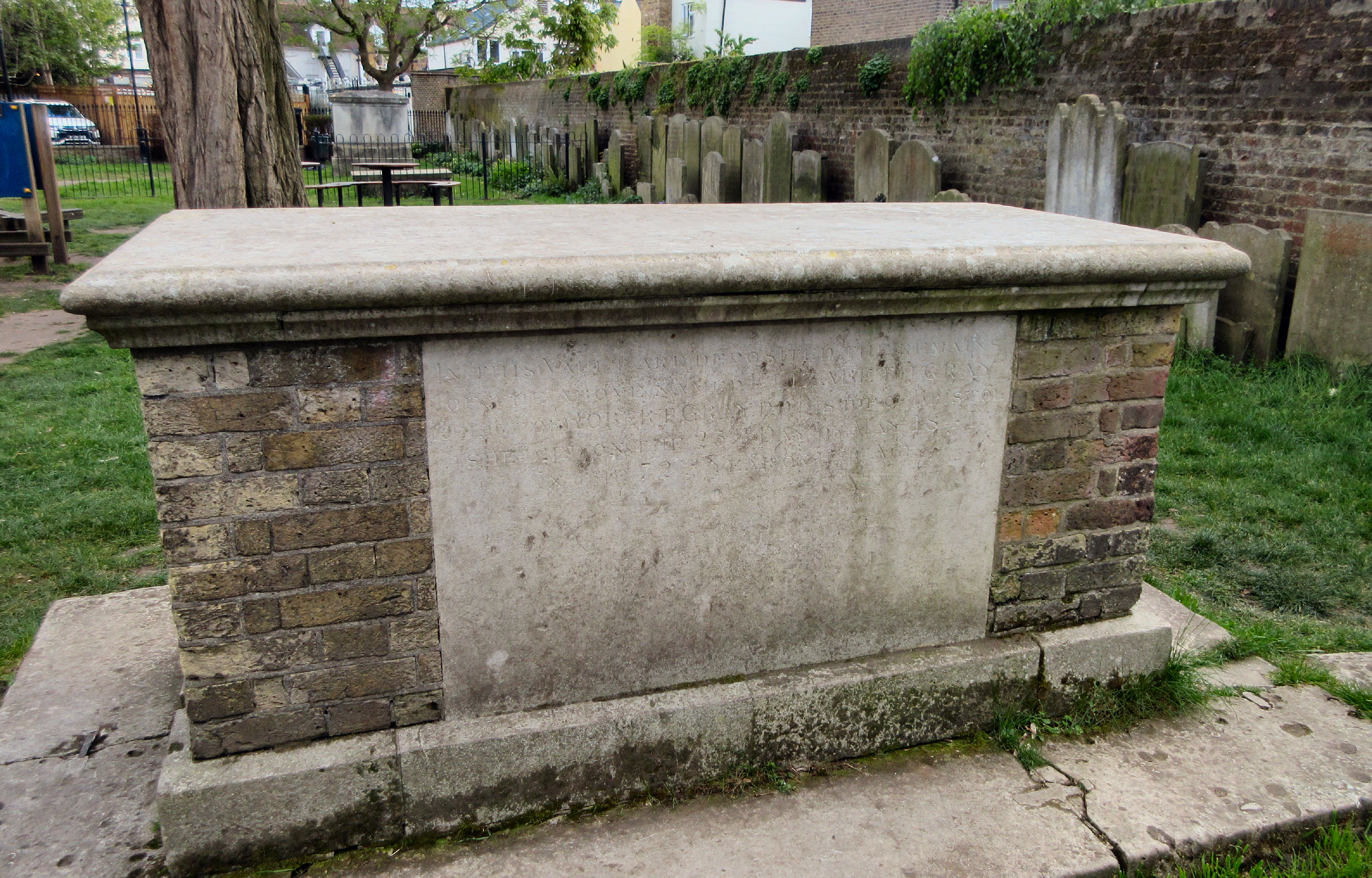
Tomb of Elizabeth Gray
