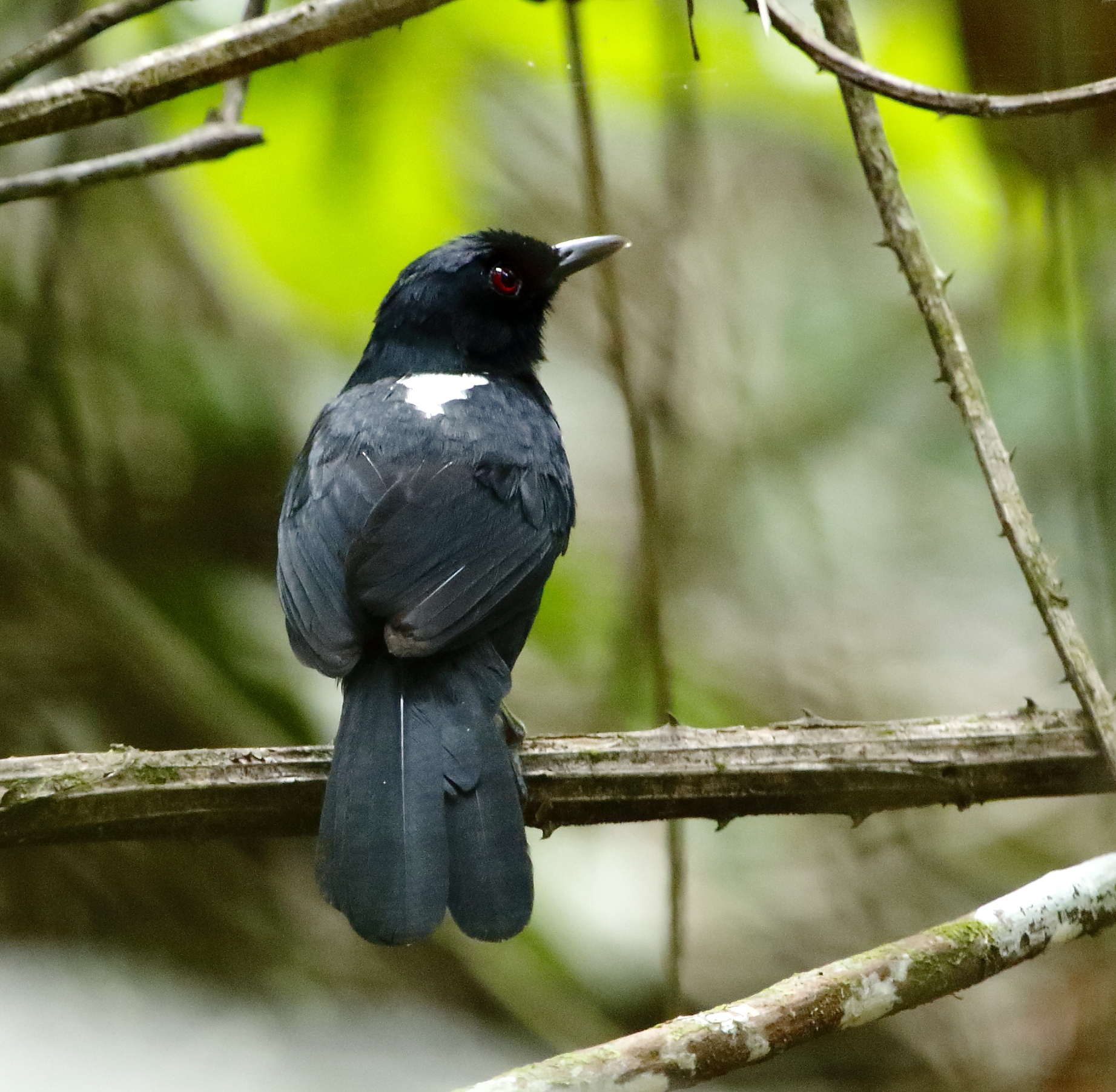
- Male

Scientific classification
- Kingdom: Animalia
- Phylum: Chordata
- Class: Aves
- Order: Passeriformes
- Family: Thamnophilidae
- Genus: Pyriglena
- Species: P. leuconota

Binomial name
- Pyriglena leuconota (Spix, 1824)

Synonyms
- Pyriglena castanoptera Chubb, 1916; Pyriglena pacifica Chapman, 1923

= East Amazonian fire-eye =

Species of bird

The East Amazonian fire-eye (Pyriglena leuconota) is an insectivorous bird in subfamily Thamnophilinae of family Thamnophilidae, the "typical antbirds". It is endemic to Brazil.

== Taxonomy and systematics ==
The East Amazonian fire-eye was described and illustrated by the German naturalist Johann Baptist von Spix in 1824 and given the binomial name Myothera leuconota. The current genus Pyriglena was introduced by the German ornithologist Jean Cabanis in 1847.

The East Amazonian fire-eye's taxonomy remains unsettled. The International Ornithological Congress, the Clements taxonomy, and the South American Classification Committee of the American Ornithological Society treat it as a species with these three subspecies:

- P. l. interposita Pinto, 1947
- P. l. leuconota (Spix, 1824)
- P. l. pernambucensis Zimmer, 1931

However, BirdLife International's Handbook of the Birds of the World (HBW) treats the three taxa as subspecies of what it calls the white-backed fire-eye, with the binomial Pyriglena leuconota sensu lato. Starting in 2020 the other three systems split the white-backed into the East Amazonian, Tapajos, and western fire-eyes.

== Description ==
The Tapajos fire-eye is 16 to 18 cm (6.3 to 7.1 in) long and weighs 26 to 36 g (0.92 to 1.3 oz); the subspecies' weights apparently vary. Both sexes have bright red irises. Males of all three subspecies are mostly glossy black with a partially hidden white patch between their scapulars and blackish gray underwing coverts. Females of the nominate subspecies P. l. leuconota have dark reddish brown crown, upperparts, and wings with a partially hidden white interscapular patch. Their tail is brownish black. Their face is brownish gray, their throat and breast buff with a brownish tinge on the latter, and their sides, flanks, belly, and crissum dark yellowish brown. Females of subspecies P. l. interposita are similar to the nominate but darker. P. l. pernambucensis females are also darker than the nominate and have a longer tail.

== Distribution and habitat ==
The East Amazonian fire-eye has a disjunct distribution in Brazil. Subspecies P. l. interposita is found in the Amazon Basin south of the Amazon between the Xingu and Tocantins rivers in eastern Pará state. Subspecies P. l. leuconota is also found in the Amazon Basin, south of the Amazon and east of the Tocantins in eastern Pará and northern Maranhão states. P. l. pernambucensis is found separately, in the eastern parts of Pernambuco and Alagoas states in northeastern Brazil. The species inhabits dense understorey vegetation in lowland and foothill evergreen forest. It mostly occurs at the edges of primary forest, in mature secondary forest, and in clearings such as those caused by fallen trees. In elevation it reaches 950 m (3,100 ft).

== Behavior ==
=== Movement ===
The East Amazonian fire-eye is believed to be a year-round resident throughout its range.

=== Feeding ===
Little is known specifically about the East Amazonian fire-eye's diet and feeding behavior, as most studies were of the pre-split white-backed fire-eye and so may include data about the western and Tapajos fire-eyes. The three are assumed to have similar diets and feeding behavior. Their diet includes a wide variety insects (e.g. orthopterans, beetles, ants, wasps, and adult and larval moths and butterflies), other arthropods such as spiders and centipedes, and small lizards up to about 11 cm (4.3 in) long. They typically forage singly, in pairs, or in family groups in dense vegetation, mostly on the ground and within about 3 m (10 ft) above it but as high as 5 m (16 ft). They hop between short feeding stops, pumping their tail. They capture prey by gleaning, reaching, jumping (upward and to the ground), lunging from a perch, and by tossing aside leaf litter on the ground. Much less frequently they make short sallies to glean or capture prey on the wing. Smaller prey is usually eaten whole; larger prey is taken to the ground and pecked and torn apart. They regularly follow army ant swarms that cross their territory to capture prey disturbed by the ants, and several family groups may congregate at a swarm. They dominate such groups when in their territory but are subordinate to obligate ant-following species.

=== Breeding ===
As is the case with diet and feeding behavior, little is known specifically about the East Amazonian fire-eye's breeding biology, and that of it and the western and Tapajos fire-eyes are assumed to similar. However, most data are from Brazil. There the breeding season is year-round though it peaks between August and November. The nest is an "oven" made of dried leaves and twigs with club mosses and grass roots mixed in, and hidden among vegetation on the ground. The male does most of the construction with the female contributing towards the end. The clutch size is usually two eggs and occasionally one. Both parents incubate the eggs during the day and the female alone at night. The incubation period is at least 12 days. Fledging occurs 10 to 11 days after hatch. Both parents brood the nestlings and provision them, though the parents apparently each provision one young.

=== Vocalization ===
The East Amazonian fire-eye's song is a "rapid, slightly rising, then descending series of very high, staccato 'weet---' notes" that lasts about two seconds. Its call is a "nasal 'thew-tjew' ".

== Status ==
The IUCN follows HBW taxonomy and so has not separately assessed the western, Tapajos, and East Amazonian fire-eyes. In 2016 it assessed the white-backed fire-eye as being of Least Concern, with an unknown population size whose trend is also unknown. It is considered fairly common throughout its range and "is more capable than many forest birds of persisting in older second growth". However, "[p]not all subspecies are equally secure, this being particularly applicable to pernambucensis.
