= Arthur Halcombe =

New Zealand farmer (1834–1900)

Arthur William Follett Halcombe (16 January 1834 – 3 March 1900) was a New Zealand farmer, farm manager and immigration agent. He was born on 16 January 1834. He was the fifth child of John Halcomb (who was later known as Halcombe), MP for Dover (1833–1835). His mother was Margaret Birch.

He came to New Zealand about 1855 as an immigration agent under the patronage of William Fox. Fox had in 1842 married Sarah Halcomb, a first cousin of Arthur Halcombe. Her father William Halcomb was his father's brother.

He married Edith Swainson on 3 December 1863 at St James' Church, Hutt. She was the daughter of William Swainson and his second wife, Anne Grasby.

He represented the Rangitikei electorate on the Wellington Provincial Council from May 1865 to March 1872. Between May 1865 and July 1871, he was a member of four Executive Councils, where he held the roles of provincial secretary and treasurer.

He lived in Feilding from the 1870s, and the nearby township of Halcombe is named for him. The settlement of Stanway near Halcombe is named for his wife; her middle name was Stanway.

The Halcombes later moved to Urenui in Taranaki, where he died on 3 March 1900. His wife survived him by three years.
