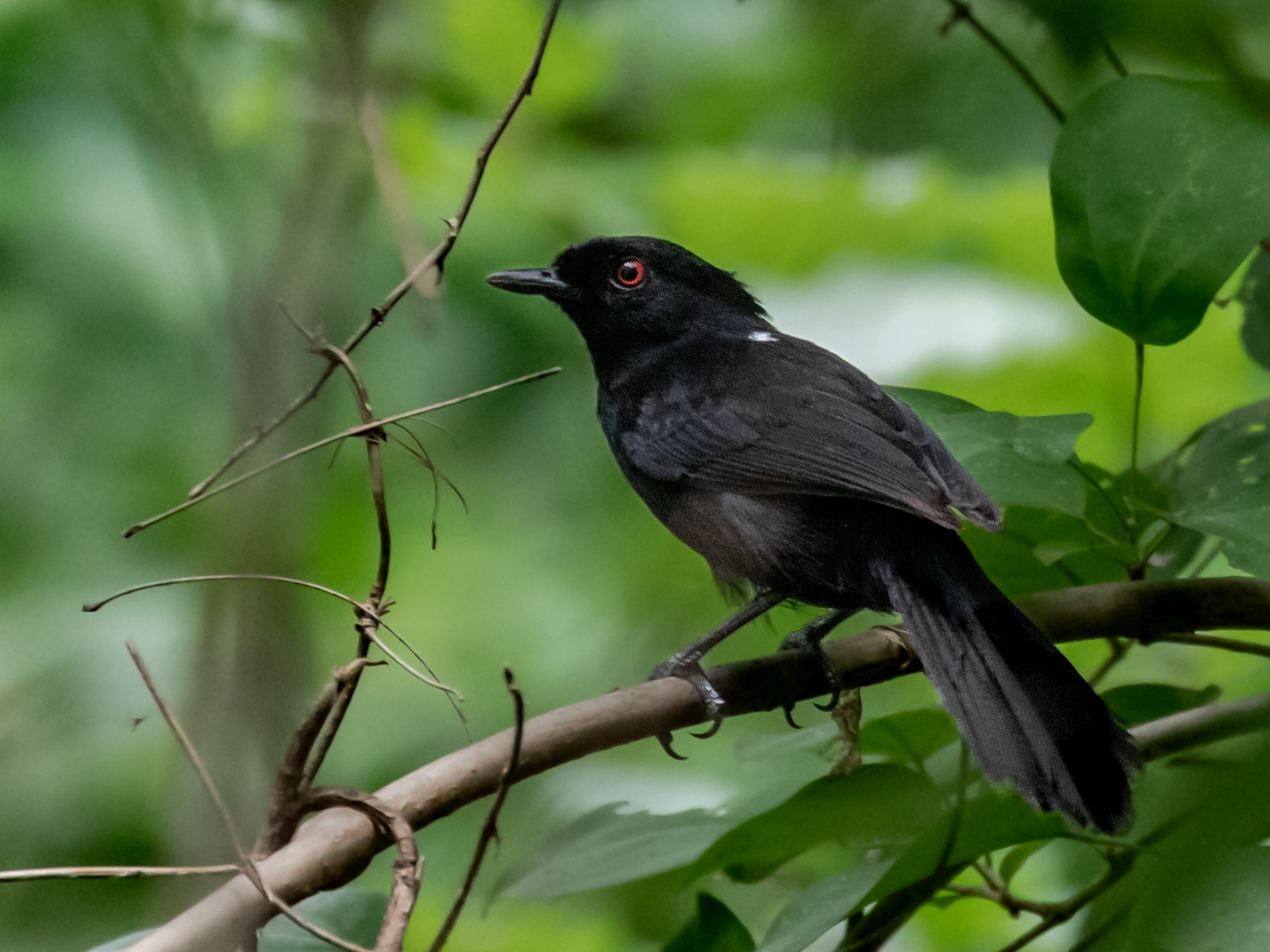

Scientific classification
- Kingdom: Animalia
- Phylum: Chordata
- Class: Aves
- Order: Passeriformes
- Family: Thamnophilidae
- Genus: Pyriglena
- Species: P. maura

Binomial name
- Pyriglena maura (Ménétries, 1835)

Synonyms
- Pyriglena leucoptera maura

= Western fire-eye =

Species of bird

The western fire-eye (Pyriglena maura) is an insectivorous bird in subfamily Thamnophilinae of family Thamnophilidae, the "typical antbirds". It is found in Bolivia, Brazil, Colombia, Ecuador, Paraguay, and Peru.

== Taxonomy and systematics ==
The western fire-eye's taxonomy is unsettled. The International Ornithological Congress, the Clements taxonomy, and the South American Classification Committee of the American Ornithological Society assign it these six subspecies:

- P. m. pacifica Chapman, 1923
- P. m. castanoptera Chubb, C, 1916
- P. m. picea Cabanis, 1847
- P. m. marcapatensis Stolzmann & Domaniewski, 1918
- P. m. hellmayri Stolzmann & Domaniewski, 1918
- P. m. maura (Ménétries, 1835)

However, BirdLife International's Handbook of the Birds of the World (HBW) treats these taxa as six of ten subspecies of what it calls the white-backed fire-eye (Pyriglena leuconota). Starting in 2020 the other three systems split the white-backed into the western, East Amazonian, and Tapajos fire-eyes. The East Amazonian retains the binomial P. leuconota and has three of the former ten subspecies, and the Tapajos (P. similis) is last one.

This article follows the six-subspecies model.

== Description ==
The western fire-eye is 16 to 18 cm (6.3 to 7.1 in) long and weighs 26 to 36 g (0.92 to 1.3 oz); the subspecies' weights apparently vary. Both sexes of all subspecies have bright red irises. Males of all the subspecies are mostly glossy black with a partially hidden white patch between their scapulars and blackish gray underwing coverts.

The females of the subspecies have different plumages. Females of the nominate subspecies P. m. maura have light rufescent brown crown and upperparts. They have a white supercilium, a black line through their eye, some white below their eye, and a light buff chin. Their underparts are buffy gray. Subspecies P. m. pacifica females have a plain face, dark reddish yellow-brown upperparts, and grayish olive-brown underparts. P. m. castanoptera females are mostly sooty black with dark chestnut-brown mantle and wings. P. m. picea females have a black head with a brown tinge, dark reddish brown upperparts, and somewhat lighter reddish brown underparts. P. m. marcapatensis females have dark yellowish brown to deep chestnut-brown crown and upperparts, a white supercilium, a black line through their eye and white under it, and a whitish chin. P. m. hellmayri females are similar to marcapatensis females but have more olivaceous upperparts.

== Distribution and habitat ==
The subspecies of the western fire-eye are found thus:

- P. m. pacifica: western Ecuador and far northwestern Peru's Department of Tumbes
- P. m. castanoptera: eastern slope of Colombia's Central Andes, both slopes of Colombia's Eastern Andes, eastern slope of Ecuador's Andes, and northern Peru's eastern Andean slope north of the Marañón River
- P. m. picea: eastern slope of central Peruvian Andes from southern Amazonas Department south to Junín and Ayacucho departments
- P. m. marcapatensis: eastern slope of southern Peruvian Andes in Madre de Dios, Cuzco, and Puno departments
- P. m. hellmayri: eastern slope of Andes in west-central Bolivia
- P. m. maura: Bolivia's eastern Santa Cruz Department, western and southern Mato Grosso state in south-central Brazil, and Alto Paraguay department in extreme northern Paraguay

The western fire-eye primarily inhabits dense understorey vegetation in lowland and foothill evergreen forest. It mostly occurs at the edges of primary forest, in mature secondary forest, and in clearings such as those caused by fallen trees. In some areas it also inhabits gallery and deciduous forest. In elevation it ranges between 500 and 2,500 m (1,600 and 8,200 ft) in Colombia, between 1,000 and 2,000 m (3,300 and 6,600 ft) in eastern Ecuador, from near sea level to 1,350 m (4,400 ft) in western Ecuador, between 400 and 800 m (1,300 and 2,600 ft) in western Peru, between 500 and 2,100 m (1,600 and 6,900 ft) in eastern Peru, between 300 and 2,200 m (1,000 and 7,200 ft) in Bolivia, and up to 900 m (3,000 ft) in Brazil.

== Behavior ==
=== Movement ===
The western fire-eye is believed to be a year-round resident throughout its range.

=== Feeding ===
Little is known specifically about the western fire-eye's diet and feeding behavior, as most studies were of the pre-split white-backed fire-eye and so may include data about the Tapajos and East Amazonian fire-eyes. The three are assumed to have similar diets and feeding behavior. Their diet includes a wide variety insects (e.g. orthopterans, beetles, ants, wasps, and adult and larval moths and butterflies), other arthropods such as spiders and centipedes, and small lizards up to about 11 cm (4.3 in) long. They typically forage singly, in pairs, or in family groups in dense vegetation, mostly on the ground and within about 3 m (10 ft) above it but as high as 5 m (16 ft). They hop between short feeding stops, pumping their tail. They capture prey by gleaning, reaching, jumping (upward and to the ground), lunging from a perch, and by tossing aside leaf litter on the ground. Much less frequently they make short sallies to glean or capture prey on the wing. Smaller prey is usually eaten whole; larger prey is taken to the ground and pecked and torn apart. They regularly follow army ant swarms that cross their territory to capture prey disturbed by the ants, and several family groups may congregate at a swarm. They dominate such groups when in their territory but are subordinate to obligate ant-following species.

== Breeding ==
As is the case with diet and feeding behavior, little is known specifically about the western fire-eye's breeding biology, and that of it and the Tapajos and East Amazonian fire-eyes are assumed to similar. Most data are from Brazil. There the breeding season is year-round though it peaks between August and November. The nest is an "oven" hidden among vegetation on the ground; the male does most of the construction with the female contributing towards the end. The clutch size is two eggs. The incubation period, time to fledging, and details of parental care are not known.

=== Vocalization ===
The song of male western fire-eyes is "a medium-length (e.g. 2 seconds) series of evenly paced short whistles that usually rise and fall slightly in pitch, sometimes also in intensity" and appears to vary somewhat among the subspecies. That of the two subspecies found in Ecuador has been written as a series of "peer" notes "fading and descending at the end". Females sing a higher pitched and longer version and typically start during the male's song. In Peru the four subspecies apparently all make the same calls, "a quiet, puttering pit'cht'cht and a low prrt; also a ringing, chattered tutututututu, a sharp pick and a mewed, descending eeww-eww".

== Conservation status ==
The IUCN follows HBW taxonomy and so has not separately assessed the western, Tapajos, and East Amazonian fire-eyes. In 2016 it assessed the white-backed fire-eye as being of Least Concern, with an unknown population size whose trend is also unknown. It is considered generally fairly common but uncommon in Colombia. Its range includes several large protected areas and "it is more capable than many forest birds of persisting in older second growth". However, it is possible that "not all subspecies are equally secure, this being particularly applicable to pacifica and maura".
