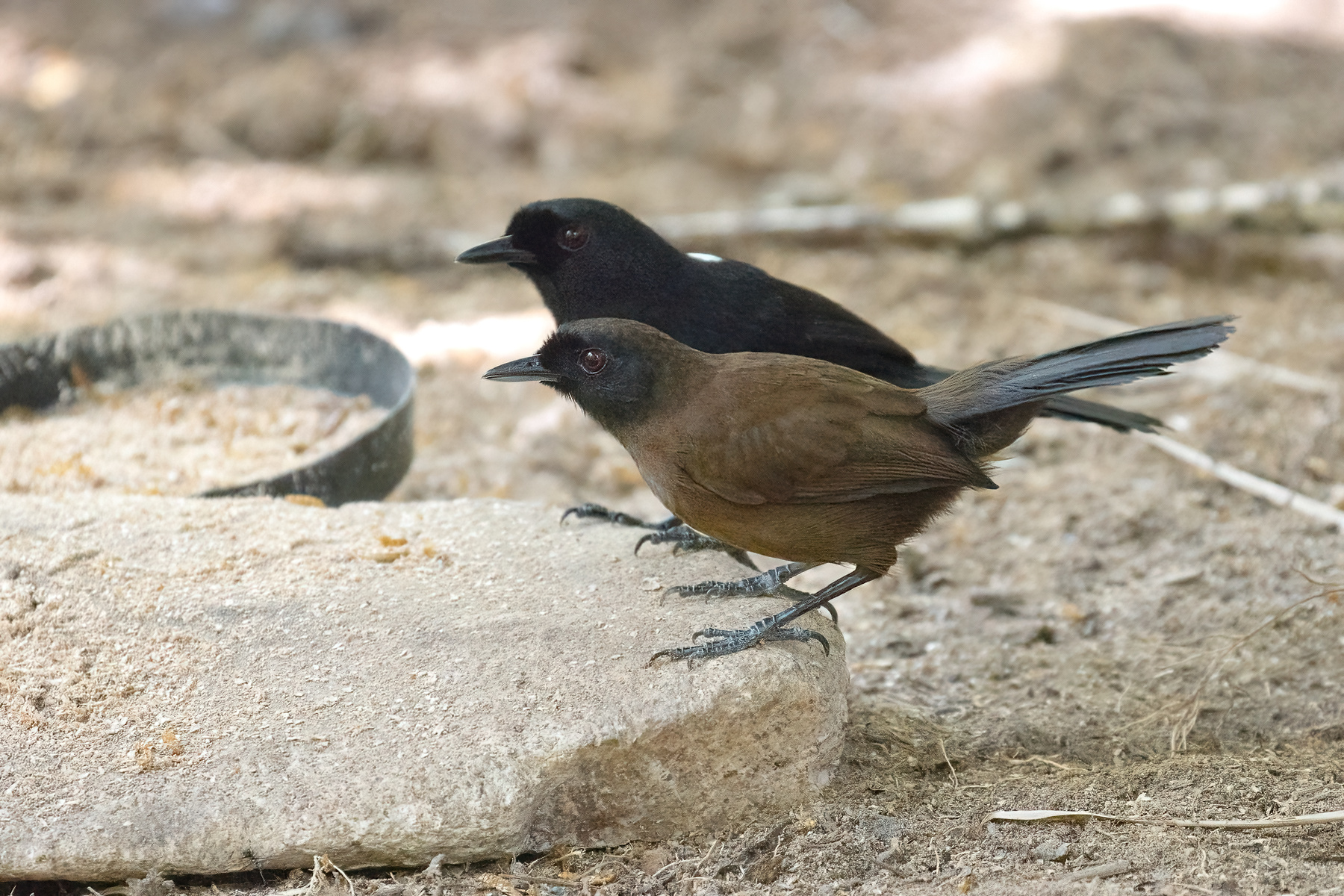

Scientific classification
- Kingdom: Animalia
- Phylum: Chordata
- Class: Aves
- Order: Passeriformes
- Family: Thamnophilidae
- Genus: Pyriglena
- Species: P. similis

Binomial name
- Pyriglena similis Zimmer, 1931

Synonyms
- Pyriglena leucoptera similis

= Tapajos fire-eye =

Species of bird

The Tapajos fire-eye (Pyriglena similis) is an insectivorous bird in subfamily Thamnophilinae of family Thamnophilidae, the "typical antbirds". It is endemic to Brazil.

== Taxonomy and systematics ==
The Tapajos fire-eye's taxonomy is unsettled. The International Ornithological Congress, the Clements taxonomy, and the South American Classification Committee of the American Ornithological Society treat it as a monotypic species. However, BirdLife International's Handbook of the Birds of the World (HBW) treats it as a subspecies of what it calls the white-backed fire-eye (Pyriglena leuconota). Starting in 2020 the other three systems split the white-backed into the Tapajos, western, and East Amazonian fire-eyes.

== Description ==
The Tapajos fire-eye is 16 to 18 cm (6.3 to 7.1 in) long. Both sexes have bright red irises. Males are mostly glossy black with a partially hidden white patch between their scapulars and blackish gray underwing coverts. Females are mostly rufous-brown with a brown-tinged black head and a partially hidden white interscapular patch.

Male

== Distribution and habitat ==
The Tapajos fire-eye is found in central Amazonian Brazil south of the Amazon between the Tapajos and Xingu rivers. It inhabits dense understorey vegetation in lowland evergreen forest. It mostly occurs at the edges of primary forest, in mature secondary forest, and in clearings such as those caused by fallen trees.

== Behavior ==
=== Movement ===
The Tapajos fire-eye is believed to be a year-round resident throughout its range.

=== Feeding ===
Little is known specifically about the Tapajos fire-eye's diet and feeding behavior, as most studies were of the pre-split white-backed fire-eye and so may include data about the western and East Amazonian fire-eyes. The three are assumed to have similar diets and feeding behavior. Their diet includes a wide variety insects (e.g. orthopterans, beetles, ants, wasps, and adult and larval moths and butterflies), other arthropods such as spiders and centipedes, and small lizards up to about 11 cm (4.3 in) long. They typically forage singly, in pairs, or in family groups in dense vegetation, mostly on the ground and within about 3 m (10 ft) above it but as high as 5 m (16 ft). They hop between short feeding stops, pumping their tail. They capture prey by gleaning, reaching, jumping (upward and to the ground), lunging from a perch, and by tossing aside leaf litter on the ground. Much less frequently they make short sallies to glean or capture prey on the wing. Smaller prey is usually eaten whole; larger prey is taken to the ground and pecked and torn apart. They regularly follow army ant swarms that cross their territory to capture prey disturbed by the ants, and several family groups may congregate at a swarm. They dominate such groups when in their territory but are subordinate to obligate ant-following species.

=== Breeding ===
As is the case with diet and feeding behavior, little is known specifically about the Tapajos fire-eye's breeding biology, and that of it and the western and East Amazonian fire-eyes are assumed to similar. However, most data are from Brazil. There the breeding season is year-round though it peaks between August and November. The nest is an "oven" hidden among vegetation on the ground; the male does most of the construction with the female contributing towards the end. The clutch size is two eggs. The incubation period, time to fledging, and details of parental care are not known.

=== Vocalization ===
The song of male Tapajos fire-eyes is "a medium-length (e.g. 2 seconds) series of evenly paced short whistles that usually rise and fall slightly in pitch, sometimes also in intensity". Females sing a higher pitched and longer version and typically start during the male's song.

== Status ==
The IUCN follows HBW taxonomy and so has not separately assessed the western, Tapajos, and East Amazonian fire-eyes. In 2016 it assessed the white-backed fire-eye as being of Least Concern, with an unknown population size whose trend is also unknown. "Due to its relatively small distribution, it may be more at risk from habitat destruction than other species, though it is more capable than many forest birds of persisting in older second growth."
