= William Swainson =

English naturalist and artist (1789–1855)

William Swainson FRS
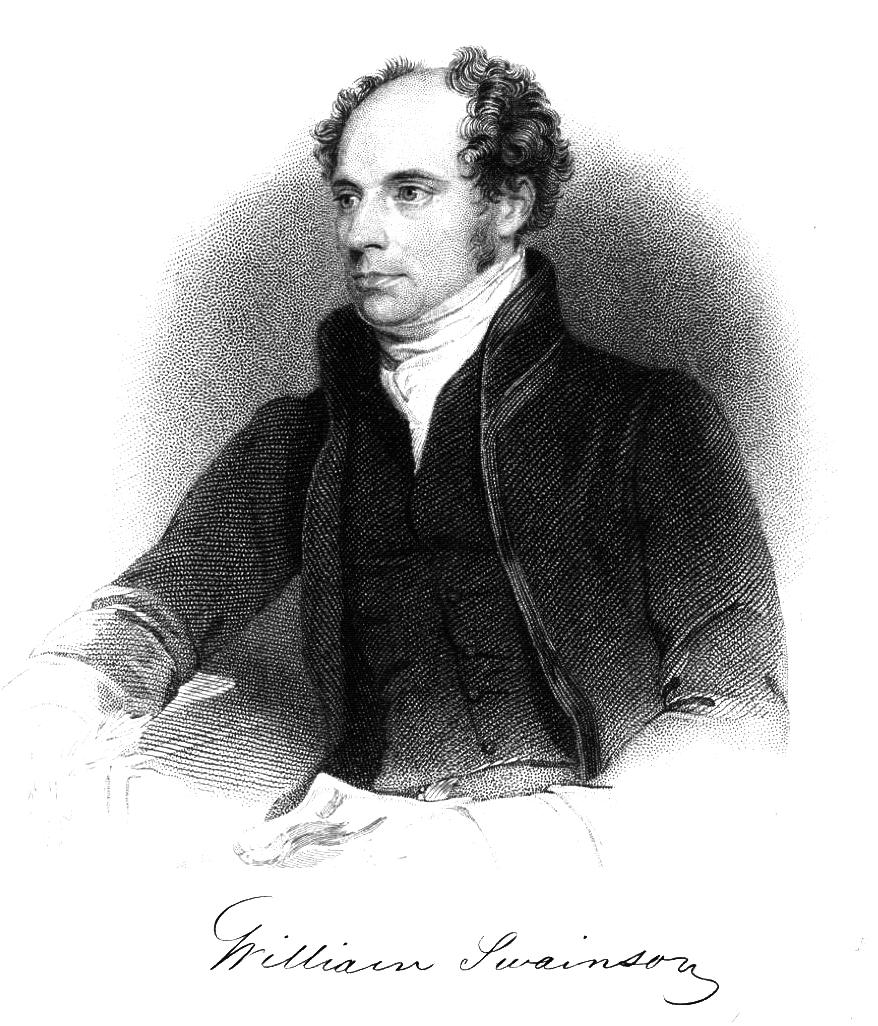
- Born: 8 October 1789; St Mary Newington, London, United Kingdom
- Died: 6 December 1855 (aged 66); Fern Grove, Hutt Valley, New Zealand
- Citizenship: United Kingdom
- Known for: Prolific illustrative works of natural history. Noted Quinarian.
- Children: Six, including Edith Stanway Halcombe
- Relatives: Isaac Swainson (cousin)
- Scientific career
- Fields: Ornithology, malacology, conchology, entomology, natural history
- Notable students: Sir Walter Buller
- Author abbrev. (botany): Swainson
- Author abbrev. (zoology): Swainson

Notes
- Emigrated to New Zealand in 1841

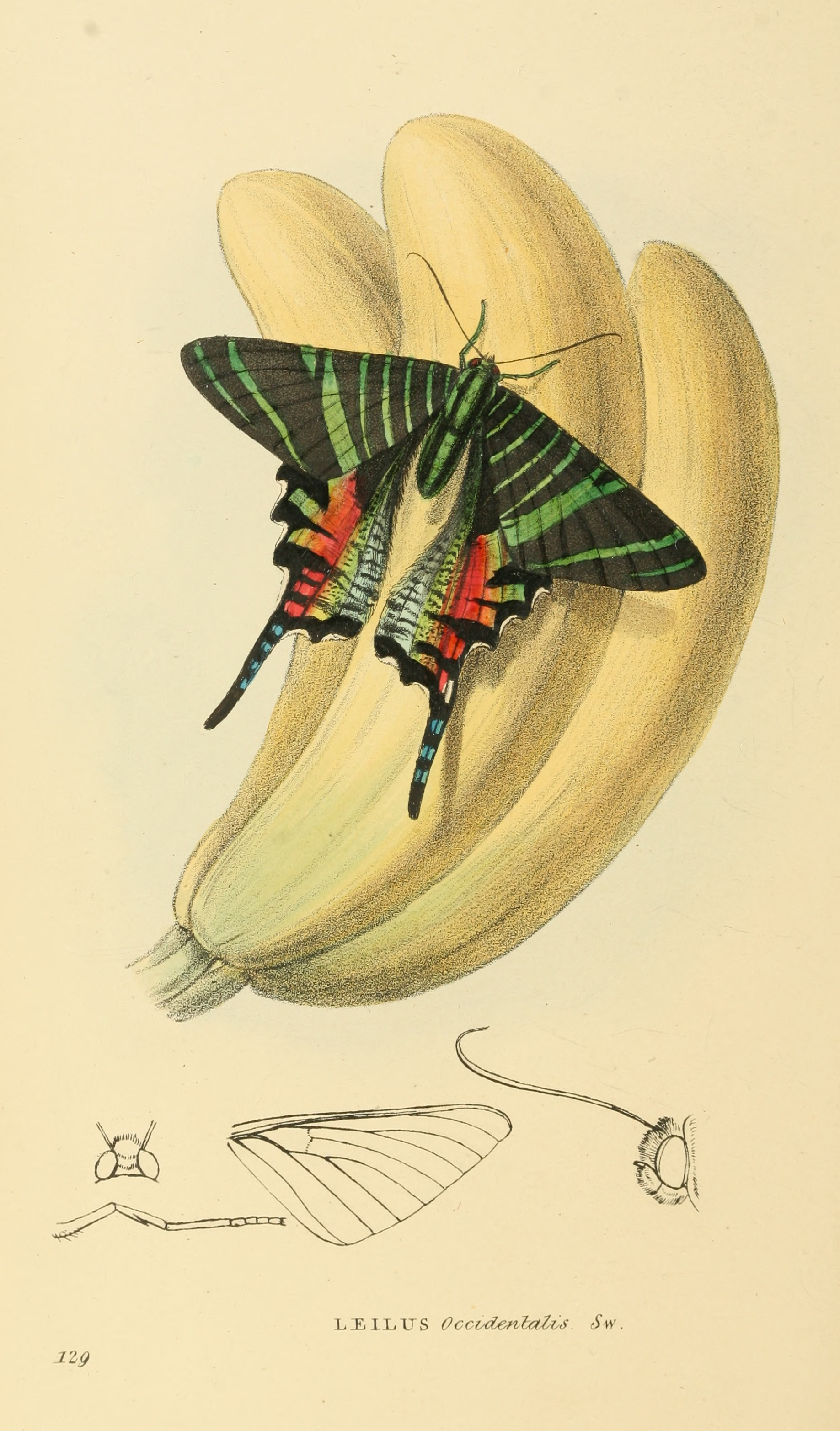
In this Zoological Illustrations lithograph Swainson depicted Urania sloanus, a now extinct species.

William Swainson FLS, FRS (8 October 1789 – 6 December 1855), was an English ornithologist, malacologist, conchologist, entomologist and artist.

== Life ==
Swainson was born in Dover Place, St Mary Newington, London, the eldest son of John Timothy Swainson, an original fellow of the Linnean Society. He was a cousin of the amateur botanist Isaac Swainson. His father's family originated in Lancashire, and both his grandfather and father held high posts in Her Majesty's Customs, his father becoming Collector at Liverpool.

William, whose formal education was curtailed because of an impediment in his speech, joined the Liverpool Customs as a junior clerk at the age of 14. He joined the Army Commissariat and toured Malta and Sicily. He studied the ichthyology of western Sicily and in 1815 was forced by ill health to return to England where he subsequently retired on half-pay. William followed in his father's footsteps to become a fellow of the Linnean Society in 1815.

In 1806 he accompanied the English explorer Henry Koster to Brazil. Koster had lived in Brazil for some years and had become famous for his book Travels in Brazil (1816). There he met Dr. Grigori Ivanovitch Langsdorff, also an explorer of Brazil and a Russian Consul General. They did not spend a long time on shore because of a revolution, but Swainson returned to England in 1818 in his words "a bee loaded with honey", with a collection of over 20,000 insects, 1,200 species of plants, drawings of 120 species of fish, and about 760 bird skins.

As with many Victorian scientists, Swainson was also a member of many learned societies, including the Wernerian Society of Edinburgh. He was elected a fellow of the Royal Society after his return from Brazil on 14 December 1820, and married his first wife Mary Parkes in 1823, with whom he had four sons (William John, George Frederick, Henry Gabriel, and Edwin Newcombe) and a daughter (Mary Frederica). His wife Mary died in 1835.

Swainson remarried in 1840 to Ann Grasby, and emigrated to New Zealand in 1841. Their daughter, Edith Stanway Swainson, married Arthur Halcombe in 1863. Swainson was involved in property management and natural history-related publications from 1841 to 1855, and forestry-related investigations in Tasmania, New South Wales, and Victoria from 1851 to 1853. Swainson died at Fern Grove, Lower Hutt, New Zealand, on 6 December 1855.

== Works on natural history ==
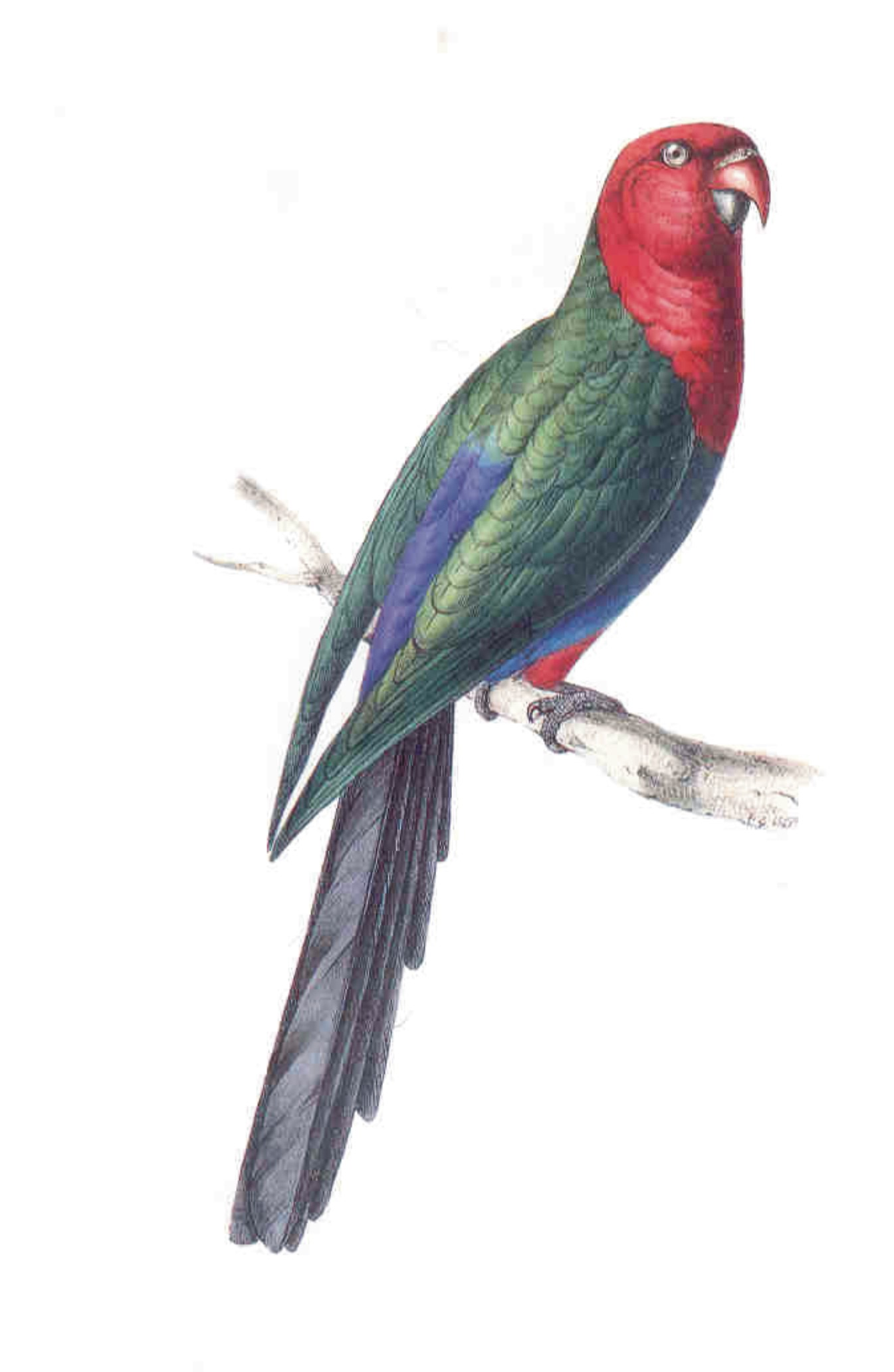
Image of a colour lithograph of a Moluccan king parrot produced by Swainson in the first volume of Zoological Illustrations

Swainson was at times quite critical of the works of others and, later in life, others in turn became quite critical of him.

Apart from the common and scientific names of many species, it is for the quality of his illustrations that he is best remembered. His friend William Elford Leach, head of zoology at the British Museum, encouraged him to experiment with lithography for his book Zoological Illustrations (1820–1823). Swainson became the first illustrator and naturalist to use lithography, which was a relatively cheap means of reproduction and did not require an engraver. He began publishing many illustrated works, mostly serially. Subscribers received and paid for fascicles, small sections of the books, as they came out, so that the cash flow was constant and could be reinvested in the preparation of subsequent parts. As book orders arrived, the monochrome lithographs were hand-coloured, according to colour reference images, known as ‘pattern plates’, which were produced by Swainson himself. It was his early adoption of this new technology and his natural skill in illustration that in large part led to his fame.

When Leach was forced to resign from the British Museum due to ill health, Swainson applied to replace him, but the post was given to John George Children. Swainson continued with his writing, the most influential of which was the second volume of Fauna Boreali-Americana (1831), which he wrote with John Richardson. This series (1829–1837) was the first illustrated zoological study to be funded in part by the British government. He also produced a second series of Zoological Illustrations (1832–1833), three volumes of William Jardine's Naturalist's Library, and eleven volumes of Dionysius Lardner's Cabinet Cyclopedia; he had signed a contract with London publisher Longman to produce fourteen illustrated volumes of 300 pages in this series, one to be produced quarterly.

=== Classification ===
In 1819, William Sharp Macleay published his ideas of the Quinarian system of biological classification, and Swainson soon became a noted and outspoken proponent. The Quinarian system later fell out of favour, giving way to the rising popularity of the geographical theory of Hugh Edwin Strickland. Swainson was overworked by Dionysius Lardner, the publisher of the Cabinet Cyclopaedia, and both Swainson and Macleay were derided for their support of the Quinarian system. Both proponents left Britain; Swainson emigrated to New Zealand and Macleay to Australia. An American visiting Australasia in the 1850s heard to his surprise that both Macleay and Swainson were living there, and imagined that they had been exiled to the Antipodes

'for the great crime of burdening zoology with a false though much laboured theory which has thrown so much confusion into the subject of its classification and philosophical study'.

== New Zealand estate ==
In 1839, Swainson became a member of the committee of the New Zealand Company and of the Church of England committee for the appointment of a bishop to New Zealand, bought land in Wellington, and gave up scientific literary work. He married his second wife, Anne Grasby, in 1840. He was apparently the first Fellow of the Royal Society to move to New Zealand. He was later made an honorary Fellow of the Royal Society of Tasmania.

Together with most of his children from his first marriage, they sailed for New Zealand in the Jane, reaching Wellington in the summer of 1841. The trip was not without incident, as the boat suffered damage en route and was in such a poor state that there was legal action on arrival. Swainson purchased 1,100 acres (4 km^{2}) in the Hutt Valley from the New Zealand Company, and established his estate of "Hawkshead". Not coincidentally, this name was shared by an ancestral home of the Swainson family in Hawkshead, Lancashire, which was the birthplace of Isaac Swainson. After a few months, the New Zealand estate was claimed by a Māori chief, Taringakuri, which led to years of uncertainty and threat. He was an officer in a militia against the Māoris in 1846. During these times he was largely dependent on his half-pay.

== Botanical studies in Australia ==
In 1851, Swainson sailed to Sydney and took the post of Botanical Surveyor with the Victoria Government in 1852, after being invited by Lieutenant-Governor Charles La Trobe to study local trees. He finished his report in 1853 in which he claimed a grand total of 1,520 species and varieties of Eucalyptidae. He identified so many species of Casuarina that he ran out of names for them.

While having quite some expertise in zoology, his untrained foray into botany was not well received. William Jackson Hooker wrote to Ferdinand von Mueller:

In my life I think I never read such a series of trash and nonsense. There is a man who left this country with the character of a first rate naturalist (though with many eccentricities) and of a very first-rate Natural History artist and he goes to Australia and takes up the subject of Botany, of which he is as ignorant as a goose.

Joseph Maiden described Swainson's efforts as "an exhibition of reckless species-making that, as far as I know stands unparalleled in the annals of botanical literature."

He had studied the flora of New South Wales, Victoria, and Tasmania before his return to New Zealand in 1854 to live at Fern Grove in the Hutt, where he died the following year.

In 1856, a poem was written by the New Zealand poet William Golder in his memory. His standard botanical abbreviation is Swainson.

== Common confusions ==
William Swainson is frequently credited with having the plant genus Swainsona named after him, and specifically Sturt's desert pea, the official floral emblem of South Australia. Although he did botanical work in this region, Swainsona is named for his cousin Isaac Swainson (1746–1812), who never travelled to this region.

== Common names of species ==
Many birds retain a common name after Swainson, several of which were named by famous naturalists of the period. Many species or subspecies retain his name, although many of his own species were later discredited or merged with others.

- John James Audubon named Swainson's warbler Limnothlypis swainsonii
- Charles Lucien Bonaparte named Swainson's hawk Buteo swainsoni
- Thomas Nuttall named Swainson's thrush Catharus ustulatus
- Swainson's francolin Francolinus swainsonii
- Swainson's sparrow Passer swainsonii
- Swainson's antcatcher Myrmeciza longipes
- Swainson's fire-eye Pyriglena atra
- Swainson's flycatcher Myiarchus swainsoni
- Swainson's toucan Ramphastos swainsonii
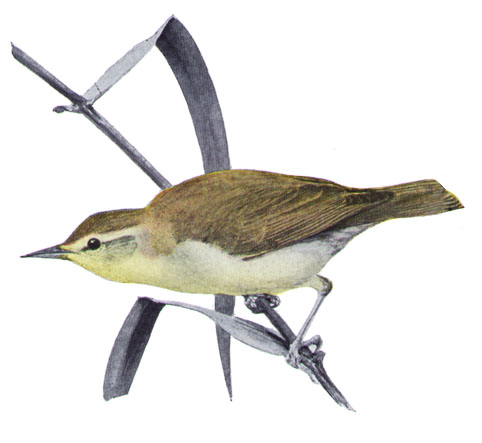
Swainson's warbler

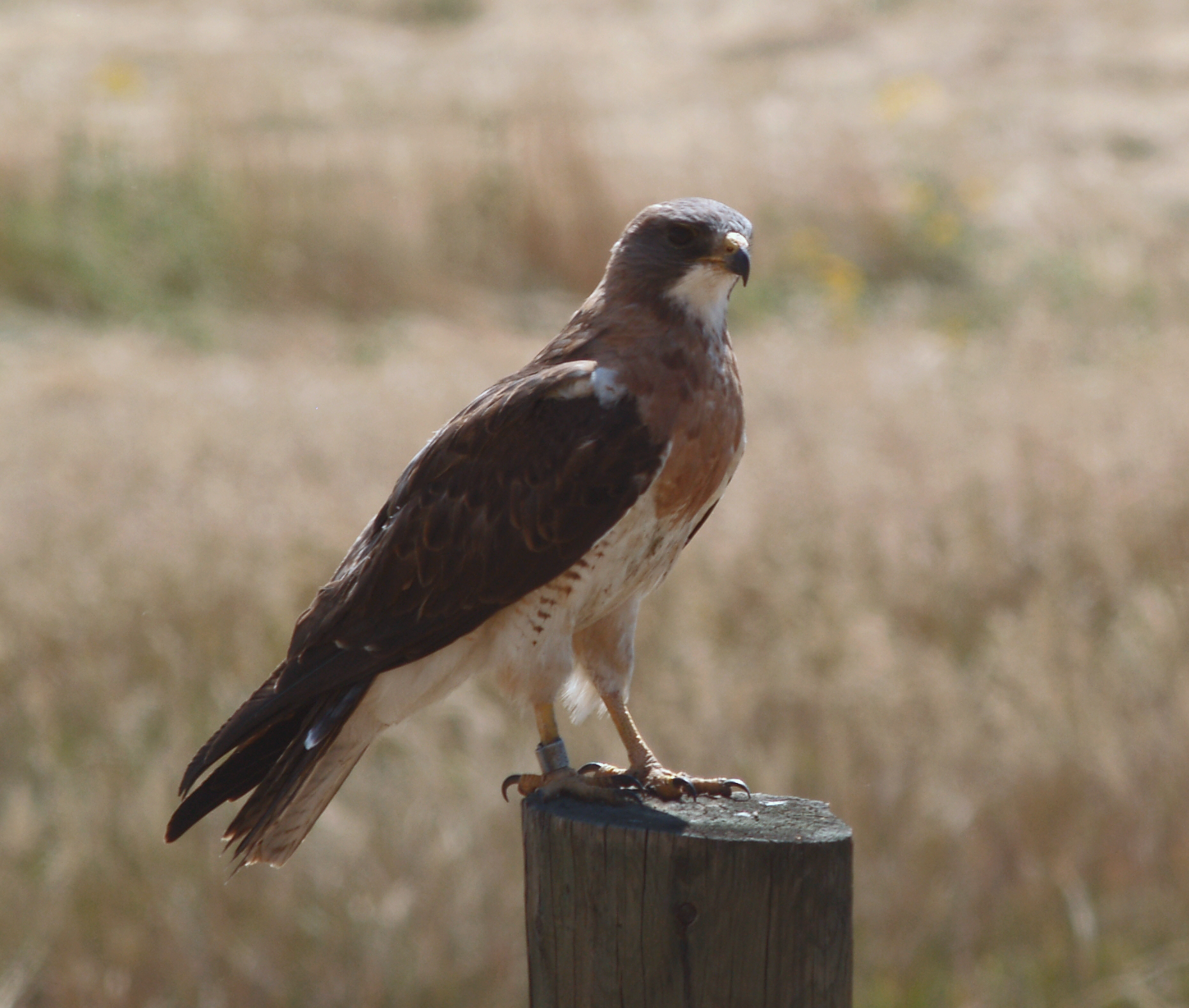
Swainson's hawk

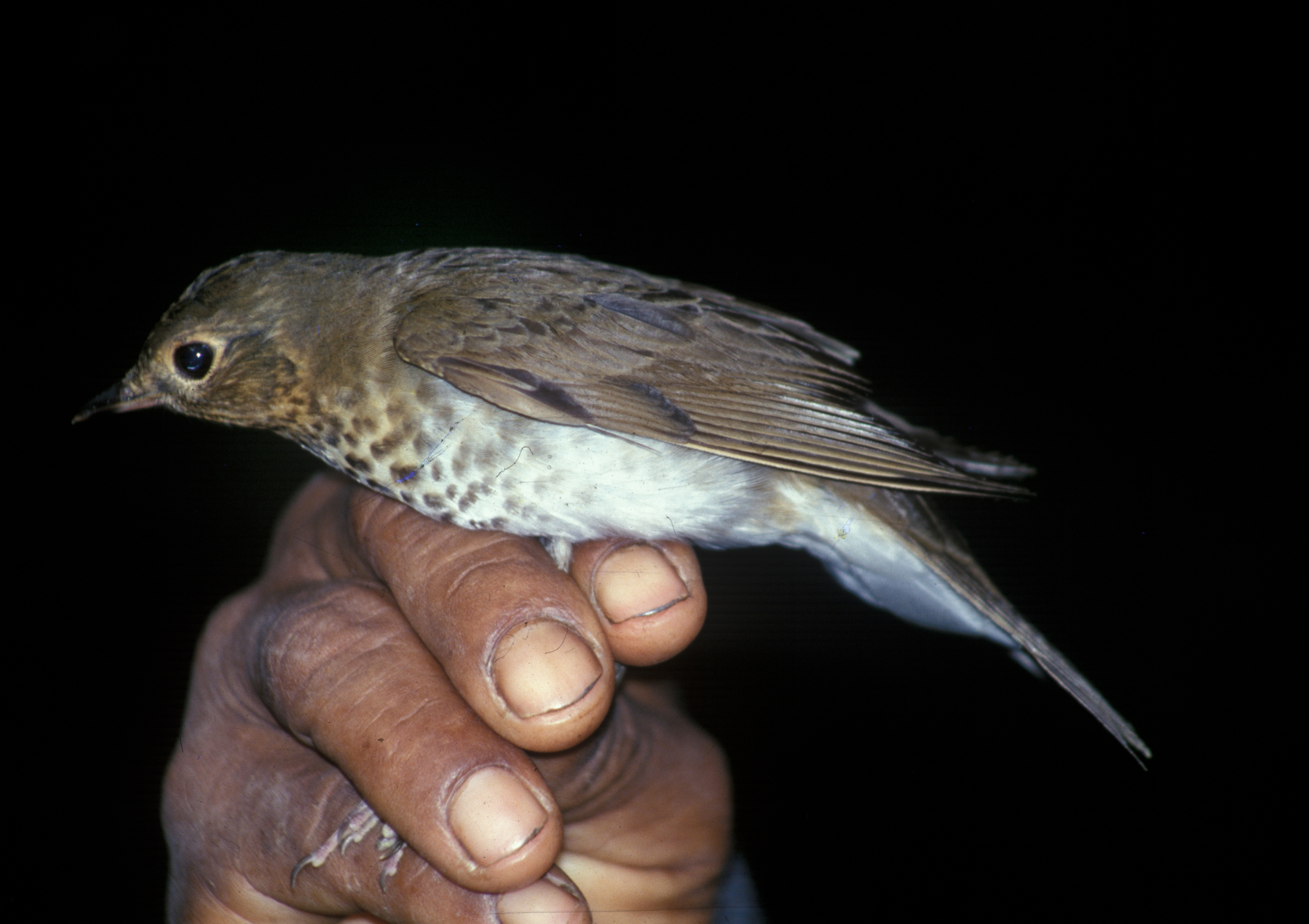
Swainson's thrush

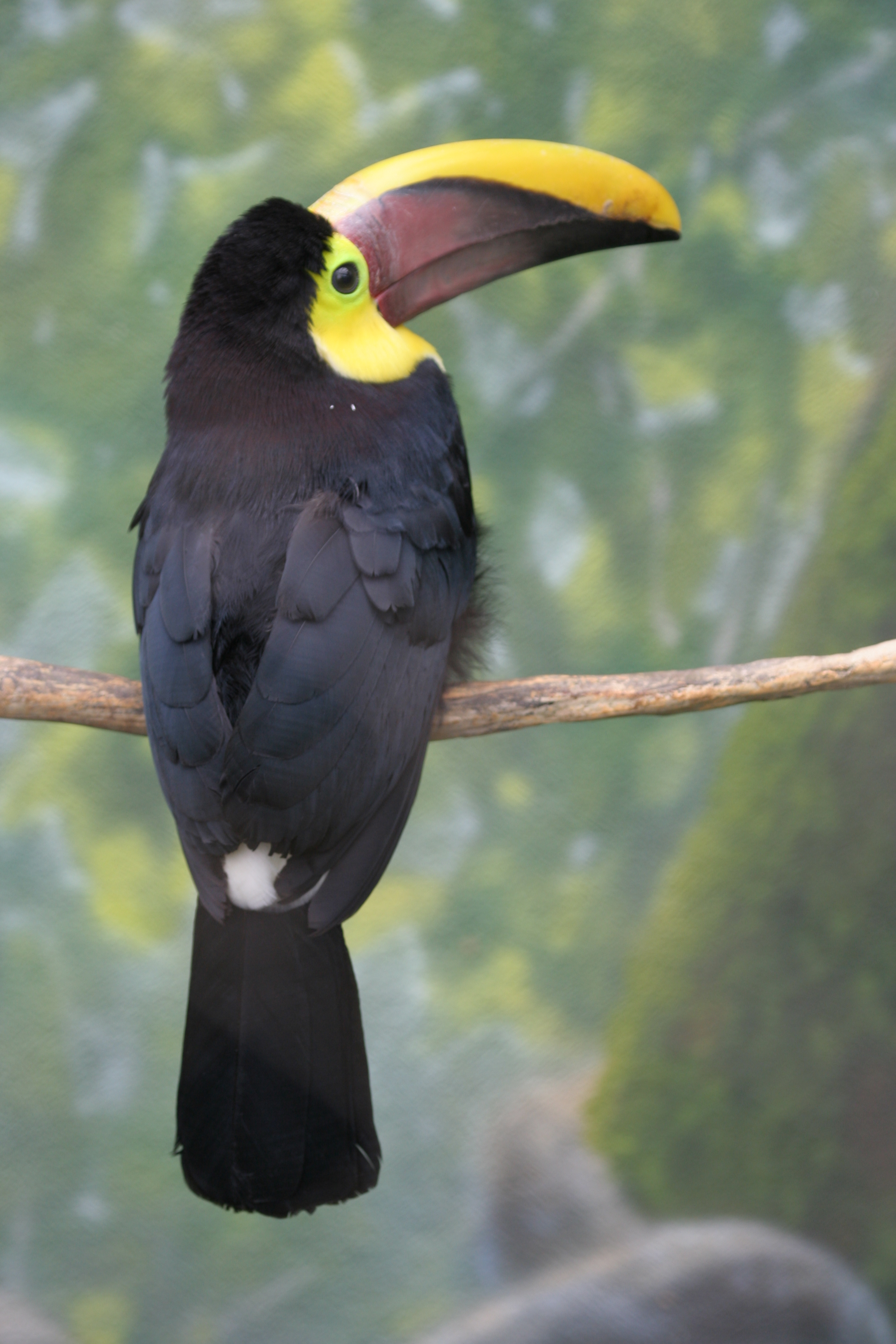
Swainson's toucan

== Taxon described by him ==
- See Category:Taxa named by William Swainson

== Partial bibliography ==
Many of these works were reprinted, or present in serial publication.

- Swainson, W. 1820. Zoological illustrations, Baldwin, Cradock, & Joy, London.
- Swainson, W. 1824. An inquiry into the natural affinities of the Lanidae or shrikes; preceded by some observations on the present state of ornithology in this country. Zool. J. 1(Art. 42): 289-307
- Swainson, W. 1825. The characters and descriptions of several birds belonging to the genus Thamnophilus. Zool. J. 2(Art. 11): 84–93. 1826.
- Swainson, W. 1827. A synopsis of the birds discovered in Mexico by W. Bullock, F. L. S., and H. S., Mr. William Bullock. Philos. Mag. (New Series) 1: 364–369, 433–442
- Swainson, W. 1827. On the tyrant shrikes of America. Q. J. Sci. Lit. Arts. Inst. 20 (Art. VI): 267–285.
- Swainson, W. 1831–1832 On several groups and forms in ornithology, not hitherto defined. Zool. J. 3(Art. 15): 158–175; 343–363.
- Swainson, W., & J. Richardson: 1831. Fauna boreali-Americana: part second, the birds, John Murray, London.
- Swainson W. 1832–1833. Zoological illustrations, Second Ser., Vol. 2. London, Baldwin, Cradrock, and R. Havell.
- Swainson, W. 1832. Zoological illustrations. Second Ser., Vol. 3. London, Baldwin, Cradrock, and R. Havell.
- Swainson, W.: 1834. A preliminary discourse on the study of natural history, Longmans, London.
- Swainson, W., 1835. The elements of modern conchology briefly and plainly stated, for the use of students and travelers. Baldwin and Cracock. London.
- Swainson, W. 1835. A Treatise on the Geography and Classification of Animals. Longman, Rees, Orme, Brown, Greene and Longman, and John Taylor, London.
- Swainson, W. 1835. On the Natural History and Classification of Quadrupeds
- Swainson, W. 1836. On the natural history and classification of birds. Vol 1. Lardner's Cabinet Cyclopedia. Longman, Rees, Orme, Brown, Green, and Longman, London.
- Swainson, W. 1836. On the natural history and classification of birds. Vol 2. Lardner's Cabinet Cyclopedia. Longman, Rees, Orme, Brown, Green, and Longman, London.
- Swainson W. 1837. The natural history of the birds of Western Africa. Vol. VII of Jardine's Naturalist's Library.
- Swainson W. 1837. The natural history of the birds of Western Africa. Vol. VIII of Jardine's Naturalist's Library.
- Swainson, W. 1838. The natural history and classification of fishes, amphibians, & reptiles, or monocardian animals. A. Spottiswoode, London. Nat. Hist. & Class. i–vi + 1–368
- Swainson, W. 1838. Animals in menageries. Lardner's Cabinet Cyclopedia. London, Longman, Rees, Orme, Brown, Green, Longman, and J. Taylor.
- Swainson, W. 1839. The Natural History of Fishes, Amphibians, & Reptiles, or Monocardian Animals. Vol. II. Lardner's Cabinet Cyclopædia. London: Longman, Orme, Brown, Green & Longmans; and John Taylor. (A. Spottiswoode, printer). 452 pp.
- Swainson, W. 1840. A treatise on malacology; or the natural classification of shells and shellfish. Lardner's Cabinet Cyclopedia. London.
- Swainson, W., Shuckard, W.E. 1840 On the History and Natural Arrangement of Insects. Lardner's Cabinet Cyclopedia. Longman, Orme, Brown, Green, & Longmans, London.
- Swainson, W. 1840. Taxidermy with the Biography of Zoologists Longman, London.
- Swainson, W. 1841. Exotic Conchology, Henry G Bohn, London.
- Swainson, W. Ornithological Drawings, first edition, 62 hand-coloured lithograph plates, no title or text as issued. 8vo, [1834–36].
  Second edition 1841. A Selection of the Birds of Brazil and Mexico with 78 plates Bohn, London.
- Wallace H, Jameson W., Hooker, R W.J., Swainson, W. 1841. An Encyclopaedia of Geography. Thomas G. Bradford (ed). Philadelphia: Lea and Blanchard.
- Swainson, W. 1843. Flycatchers. Ornithology. Volume XIII, Jardine's Naturalist's Library [xvi], t.e.g. Edinburgh: W. H. Lizars.
- Swainson W. Ornithology Birds of Western Africa- Part 1 1862. The Naturalists Library, W Jardine (ed) Vol XI. (A reprint of 1837)
