= Edith Halcombe =

New Zealand artist

Edith Stanway Halcombe (née Swainson; 27 April 1844 – 14 June 1903) was a New Zealand artist, community leader and farmer. She was born on 27 April 1844, the daughter of William Swainson and his second wife, Anne Grasby. She was taught art by her father who was a competent artist in his own right. She married Arthur Halcombe on 3 December 1863 at St James' Church, Hutt.

Her artworks are in the Museum of New Zealand Te Papa Tongarewa, Auckland Art Gallery, and Puke Ariki. They are mainly landscapes in Manawatū.
