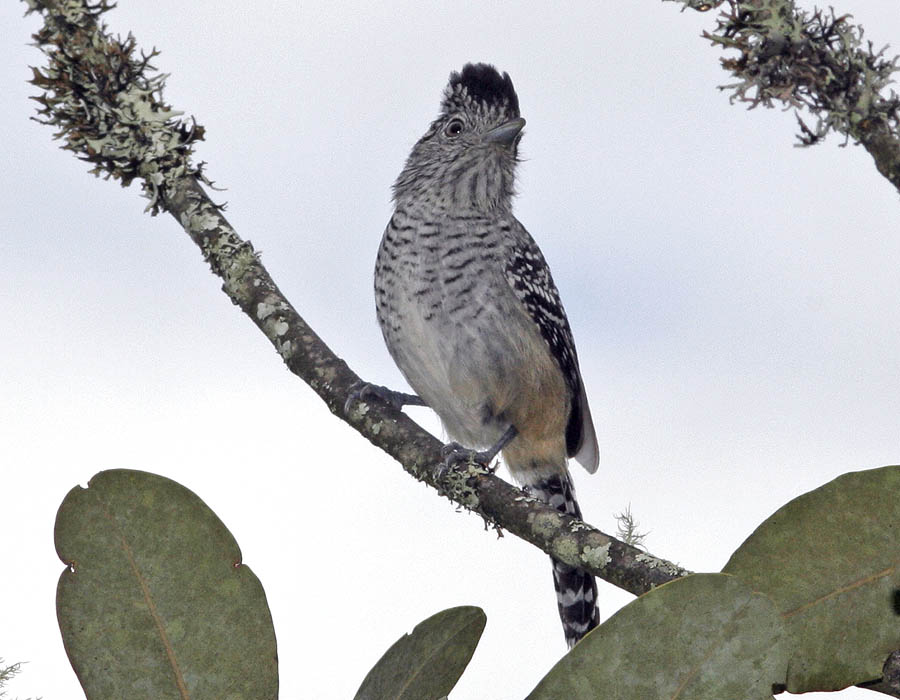

Conservation status
- Least Concern (IUCN 3.1)

Scientific classification
- Kingdom: Animalia
- Phylum: Chordata
- Class: Aves
- Order: Passeriformes
- Family: Thamnophilidae
- Genus: Thamnophilus
- Species: T. zarumae

Binomial name
- Thamnophilus zarumae Chapman, 1921

= Chapman's antshrike =

Species of bird

Chapman's antshrike (Thamnophilus zarumae) is a species of bird in subfamily Thamnophilinae of family Thamnophilidae, the "typical antbirds". It is found in Ecuador and Peru.

== Taxonomy and systematics ==
Chapman's antshrike was originally described as a species but was soon transferred to be a subspecies of the barred antshrike (Thamnophilus doliatus). At the same time a new taxon was described as another subspecies of the barred antshrike (T. d. palamblae). In the late twentieth century Chapman's antshrike again began to be recognized as a separate species with palambae as a subspecies, and a few years later a phylogenetic study showed that it was not closely related to the barred antshrike.

The two subspecies of Chapman's antshrike are therefore T. d. zarumae and T. d. palamblae.

== Description ==
Chapman's antshrike is 14 to 15.5 cm (5.5 to 6.1 in) long and weighs about 22 g (0.78 oz). Members of genus Thamnophilus are largish members of the antbird family; all have stout bills with a hook like those of true shrikes. This species exhibits marked sexual dimorphism though both sexes have a bushy crest. Adult males of the nominate subspecies T. d. zarumae have a black and white streaked forehead and a black crown and crest. Their face and the sides of their neck are streaked with black and white. They have a medium gray "collar". Their back, scapulars, rump, tail, and wings are black with white bars. Their throat is white with black streaks. Their breast and sides are white lightly barred with black, their belly center unmarked white, and their flanks and undertail coverts cinnamon buff. Adult females have a rufous crest. The sides of their head and neck are whitish buff with black streaks. Their collar is olive brown. Their upperparts, wings, and tail are cinnamon rufous. Their throat is pale buff with thin black streaks. Their breast, belly, and sides are buff with faint gray marks on the breast. Adults of both sexes have a pale but variably colored iris, a black maxilla, a blue-gray mandible, and blue-gray legs and feet. Immature males are barred with black and cinnamon buff and their flight feathers are dusky rather than black. Males of subspecies T. d. palamblae have fainter white bars on their upperparts than the nominate, with a buffier belly and deeper ochraceous flanks and undertail coverts. Females have darker upperparts than the nominate, with a darker rufous crown and deeper ochraceous flanks.

== Distribution and habitat ==
Chapman's antshrike has a disjunct distribution. The nominate subspecies is found from southwestern Ecuador's El Oro and Loja provinces south into Peru's Department of Tumbes and northeastern Piura. Subspecies T. d. palamblae is found in Peru in southeastern Piura and eastern Department of Lambayeque. The species inhabits the interior and edges of deciduous and semi-deciduous forest and secondary woodland. It favors dense vegetation, including areas heavy with vines, in the forest understorey to mid-storey. In Ecuador it ranges mostly between elevations of 800 and 2,000 m (2,600 and 6,600 ft). In Peru it occurs mostly between 600 and 2,100 m (2,000 and 6,900 ft) and locally as high as 2,600 m (8,500 ft).

== Behavior ==
=== Movement ===
Chapman's antshrike is a year-round resident throughout its range.

=== Feeding ===
The diet of Chapman's antshrike is not known in detail but includes larval caterpillars, Orthoptera such as grasshoppers, and spiders. It has been recorded eating the berries of a Meliaceae tree. The species usually forages singly or in pairs and sometimes joins mixed-species feeding flocks. It forages in dense vegetation from near the ground to about 15 m (50 ft) above it. It hops between branches and also climbs branches and vines to glean prey from leaves, stems, branches, and trunks. It has been noted probing small bromeliads.

=== Breeding ===
Nothing is known about the breeding biology of Chapman's antshrike.

=== Vocalization ===
The song of Chapman's antshrike is "an accelerating series of 12-14 nasal notes, followed by three higher pitched, broad amplitude notes and then ending in a short rattle or trill". Schulenberg et al. write it as "pew pew-pew-pwe'pu'puPEWpee pew-trr'eh". Its calls include "a nasal 'nah' ", "a high, descending, mewing whistle: peew", and "an abrupt chup".

== Status ==
The IUCN has assessed Chapman's antshrike as being of Least Concern. It has a restricted range and an unknown population size that is believed to be decreasing. "Much of the land within the species's rather restricted altitudinal range has been cleared for agriculture, and destruction of habitat is ongoing." However, at least one group of authors believe it should be treated as threatened. It is considered uncommon in Peru though the Tumbes National Reserve "protects a significant amount of habitat for this species".
