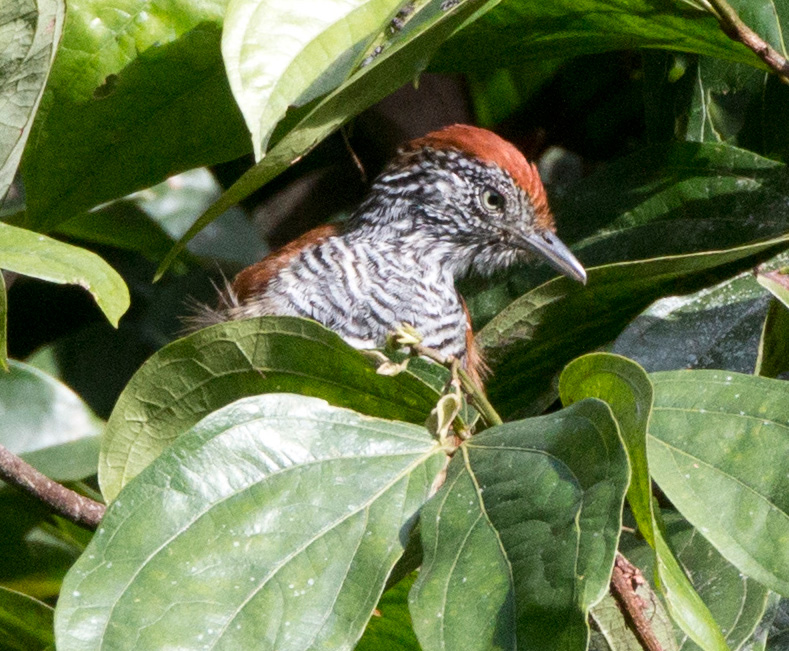
- Female, near Zamora, Ecuador

Conservation status
- Least Concern (IUCN 3.1)

Scientific classification
- Kingdom: Animalia
- Phylum: Chordata
- Class: Aves
- Order: Passeriformes
- Family: Thamnophilidae
- Genus: Thamnophilus
- Species: T. tenuepunctatus

Binomial name
- Thamnophilus tenuepunctatus Lafresnaye, 1853

= Lined antshrike =

Species of bird

The lined antshrike (Thamnophilus tenuepunctatus) is a species of bird in subfamily Thamnophilinae of family Thamnophilidae, the "typical antbirds". It is found in Colombia, Ecuador, and Peru.

== Taxonomy and systematics ==
What is now the lined antshrike was previously treated by several authors as a subspecies of the chestnut-backed antshrike (T. palliatus). A study published in 2007 confirmed that the lined antshrike is a full species and sister to the chestnut-backed.

The lined antshrike has three subspecies, the nominate T. t. tenuepunctatus (Lafresnaye, 1853), T. t. tenuifasciatus (Lawrence, 1867), and T. t. berlepschi (Taczanowski, 1884).

== Description ==
The lined antshrike is 15 to 16 cm (5.9 to 6.3 in) long and weighs 22 to 23 g (0.78 to 0.81 oz). Members of genus Thamnophilus are largish members of the antbird family; all have stout bills with a hook like those of true shrikes. This species exhibits marked sexual dimorphism though both sexes have a crest. Adult males of the nominate subspecies are almost entirely plumaged with narrow white and wider black bars. Their crown and crest are black and their throat is streaked black and white. Adult females have a rufous crown, crest, upperparts, wings, and tail. Their nape has a narrow band of black and white or black and pale reddish brown. The sides of their head and throat are streaked black and white. The rest of their underparts are barred black and white with a reddish brown tinge on their lower flanks. Adults of both sexes have a pale iris that is variable in color. Subadult males resemble adult males with a yellowish-brown tinge on their body and flight feathers. Males of both subspecies T. t. tenuifasciatus and T. t. berlepschi have roughly equal width black and white bars and more white on their foreheads than the nominate. Females are paler than the nominate with wider white bars on their underparts.

== Distribution and habitat ==
The lined antshrike is found along the eastern slope of the Andes of Colombia, Ecuador, and Peru. The nominate subspecies is the northernmost; it is found in north-central Colombia's departments of Cundinamarca and Meta and separately in Norte de Santander. Subspecies T. t. tenuifasciatus is found from south-central Colombia's Putumayo Department south through nearly all of Ecuador's length to northern Zamora-Chinchipe Province. T. t. berlepschi is found from southern Zamora-Chinchipe into northeastern Peru's departments of Amazonas, Cajamarca, and San Martín.

The lined antshrike primarily inhabits the edges of humid evergreen forest and secondary forest, where it favors areas heavy with shrubs and other undergrowth. In elevation it is found between 400 and 1,500 m (1,300 and 4,900 ft) in Colombia and mostly between 400 and 1,400 m (1,300 and 4,600 ft) in Ecuador. In Peru it occurs between 700 and 1,700 m (2,300 and 5,600 ft) in the Andes and locally as low as between 200 m (700 ft) in the valley of the Marañón River.

== Behavior ==
=== Movement ===
The lined antshrike is presumed to be a year-round resident throughout its range.

=== Feeding ===
The lined antshrike's diet is not known in detail but includes insects and other arthropods. It usually forages singly or in pairs and rarely joins mixed-species feeding flocks. It forages in dense vegetation from near the ground to about 10 m (35 ft) above it. It hops between branches to glean prey with quick stabs from leaves, stems, branches, and trunks.

=== Breeding ===
The lined antshrike's breeding season has not been defined; the only evidence of it was a nest found with two eggs in Ecuador in late March. It was a cup woven from rootlets, leave petioles, and some fungal rhizomorphs with moss on the outside and danging from it. It was suspended from a branch fork in a shrub 2.2 m (7 ft) above the ground. Another, used, nest in Ecuador was of similar construction and 1 m (3 ft) above the ground. Nothing else is known about the species' breeding biology.

=== Vocalization ===
The lined antshrike's song is "an accelerating series of abrupt nasal notes that rises in pitch initially, falls towards end, and terminates in strong, downslurred raspy note". It has been written as "hah-ha-ha-hahahahahahahaha-hánh".

== Status ==
The IUCN originally in 2006 assessed the lined antshrike as being of Least Concern, then is 2012 uplisted it to Vulnerable, and in 2023 returned it to of Least Concern. It has a large range; its population size is not known but is believed to be stable. "A potential threat to this species is deforestation, as land is cleared for agricultural purposes. Tree cover loss is however currently slow, and due to its low sensitivity to habitat disturbance the species is not thought to be negatively affected." It is considered fairly common in Colombia, fairly numerous in Ecuador, and fairly common in Peru.
