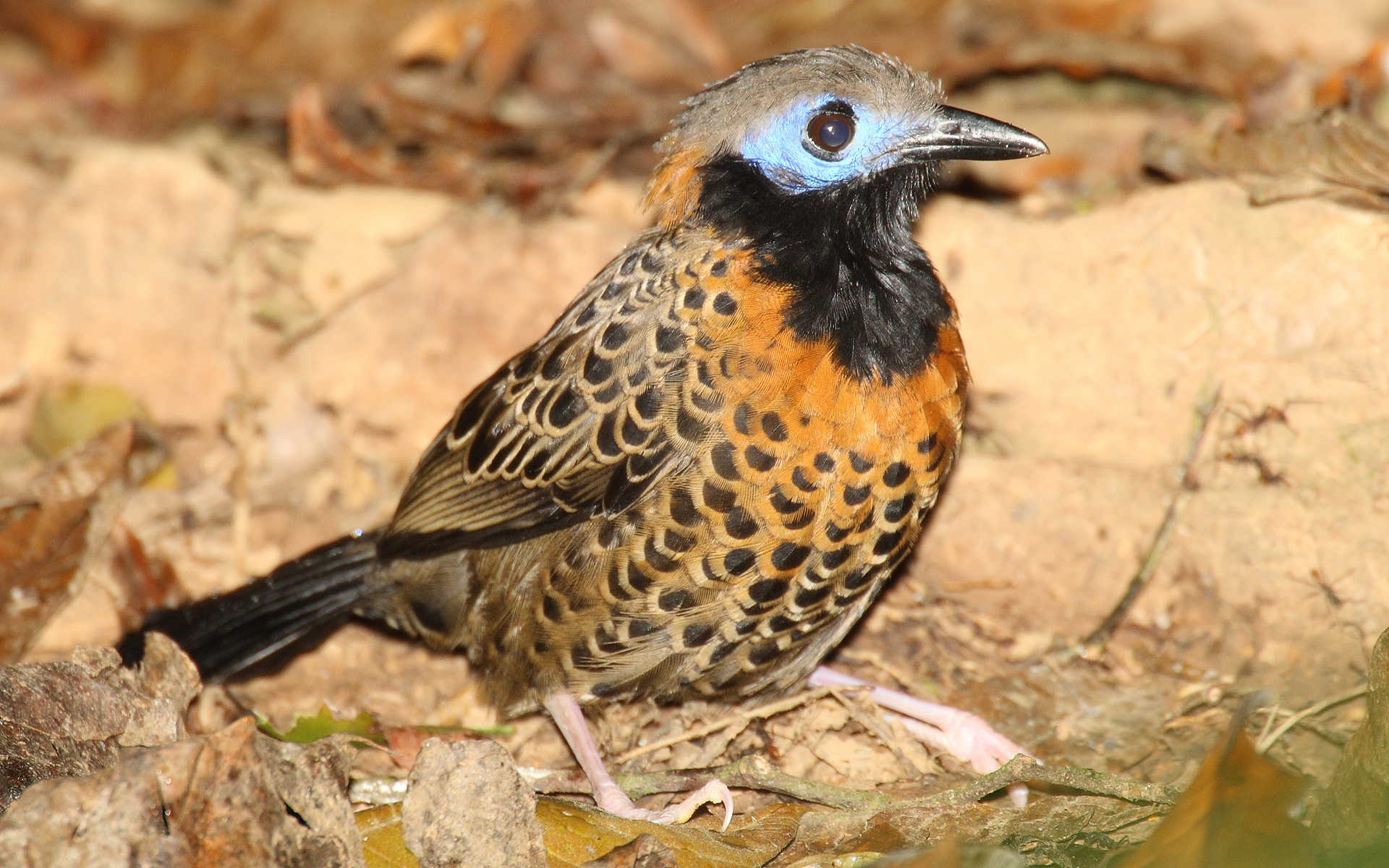

Conservation status
- Least Concern (IUCN 3.1)

Scientific classification
- Kingdom: Animalia
- Phylum: Chordata
- Class: Aves
- Order: Passeriformes
- Family: Thamnophilidae
- Genus: Phaenostictus; Ridgway, 1909
- Species: P. mcleannani

Binomial name
- Phaenostictus mcleannani (Lawrence, 1860)

= Ocellated antbird =

Species of bird

The ocellated antbird (Phaenostictus mcleannani) is a species of antbird in subfamily Thamnophilinae of family Thamnophilidae, the "typical antbirds". It is found in Colombia, Costa Rica, Ecuador, Honduras, Nicaragua, and Panama.

== Taxonomy and systematics ==
The ocellated antbird was formally described in 1861 by the American amateur ornithologist George Newbold Lawrence and given the binomial name Phlogopsis mcleannani (misspelled as Meleannani). The ocellated antbird is now placed in the genus Phaenostictus that was erected in 1909 by the American ornithologist Robert Ridgway. The genus name is derived from the Ancient Greek phainō meaning "to display" and stiktos for "spotted". The specific epithet honors James McLeannan, a railway engineer on the Panama Canal Railway, who had collected the type specimen in Panama. Ridgway considered that the species was related to the genus Phlegopsis (the bare-eyes) but that it differed in having a longer tail, rounded nostrils and a few other characters.

Molecular phylogenetic studies of the antbird family, Thamnophilidae, have found that the ocellated antbird sits in the tribe Pithyini and its closest relatives are in genus Pithys.

The ocellated antbird is the only member of its genus and has three subspecies, the nominate P. m. mcleannani (Lawrence, 1860), P. m. saturatus (Richmond, 1896), and P. m. pacificus (Hellmayr, 1924).

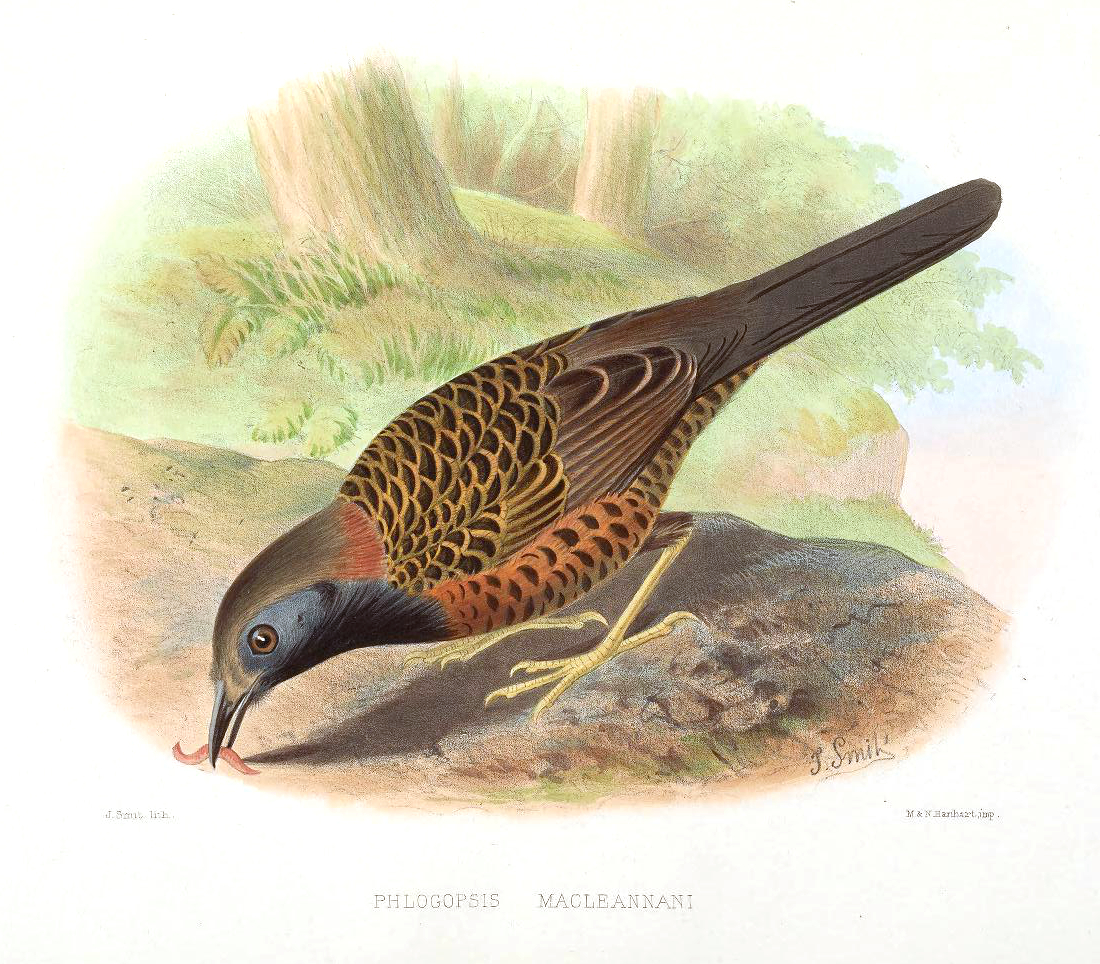
Illustration by Joseph Smit from 1869

== Description ==
The ocellated antbird is a largish antbird with a long bill and tail. It is 17.5 to 20 cm (6.9 to 7.9 in) long and weighs about 50 g (1.8 oz). Females tend to be slightly smaller than males and weigh slightly less. The species conforms with Bergmann's rule, with birds closer to the Equator having smaller wings and bills than those further away. Except for their slight size differences, the sexes are otherwise the same, and the subspecies have very little variation. Adults have a brown-gray crown, a rufous-brown nape, bright blue bare skin around the eye, and black cheeks and throat. Their back feathers and wing coverts are black with narrow rufous-brown edges that give a scaly appearance. Their rump is plain greenish brown, their flight feathers plain dark brown, and their tail black. Their breast is plain rufous-brown like their nape. Their belly feathers are black with wider rufous-brown edges than the back feathers and their vent area is reddish brown. Immature birds are similar to adults but with a darker cap and a less crisp pattern on their back and belly.

== Distribution and habitat ==
The ocellated antbird ranges from Honduras to Ecuador. Subspecies P. m. saturatus is the northernmost, found from northern and eastern Honduras south through Nicaragua and the Caribbean slope of Costa Rica into Bocas del Toro Province in extreme western Panama. The nominate subspecies is found from central and eastern Panama into northwestern and western Colombia as far as Valle del Cauca Department. P. m. pacificus is found from extreme southwestern Colombia into northwestern Ecuador's Esmeraldas Province.

The ocellated antbird inhabits lowland and foothill evergreen forest, where it favors old-growth primary forest but occurs in mature secondary forest as well. It almost entirely remains in the forest undergrowth. In elevation it reaches 1,250 m (4,100 ft) in much of Central America though only to 1,200 m (3,900 ft) in Costa Rica. In Colombia it occurs below 900 m (3,000 ft) and in Ecuador mostly below 400 m (1,300 ft) but locally reaches 700 m (2,300 ft).

== Behavior ==
=== Movement ===
The ocellated antbird is a year-round resident throughout its range.

=== Feeding ===
The ocellated antbird is an obligate ant follower that feeds on arthropods that flee foraging army ant swarms such as those of Eciton burchellii. It typically forages in pairs or family groups, perching within about 1 m (3 ft) of the ground, often near the front of the ant swarm, and sallying after prey. Though ocellated antbirds do not join conventional mixed-species foraging flocks, often several species of birds attend the same ant swarms, and the ocellated antbird is often the dominant species. It seldom enters or crosses open areas unless the ants that they are following do so.

=== Breeding ===
The ocellated antbird's social biology is unusual for the antbird family. The breeding pair form the nucleus of a group or clan that includes their male offspring and their mates. These clans work together to defend nesting territories against rivals. Their nest is a cup made of twigs, bits of vine, and leaves held together with fungal rhizomorphs, and is typically placed on the ground between buttresses of a tree. The clutch is typically two eggs. Both parents incubate the clutch and provision the young. The incubation period, time to fledging, and other details of parental care are not known.

=== Vocalization ===
The ocellated antbird's primary song is a loud "high, thin series of whistles that rises then falls, with latter notes gaining in harsh quality" that has been written as "peee-peee-pee-peepee-ee-ee-ee-ee-ee-ee-ee-eer-eer". It also has a fainter version of the song with more notes but without the harsh ending and another version with "chirring" notes interspersed. At ant swarms it often gives a nasal "dzurrr" or "dzeerr".

== Status ==
The IUCN has assessed the ocellated antbird as being of Least concern. It has a very large range; its population size is not known and is believed to be decreasing. No immediate threats have been identified. "Ocellated Antbirds are demonstrated to be very sensitive to forest fragmentation [and its] large feeding range requirements also contribute to their sensitivity."
