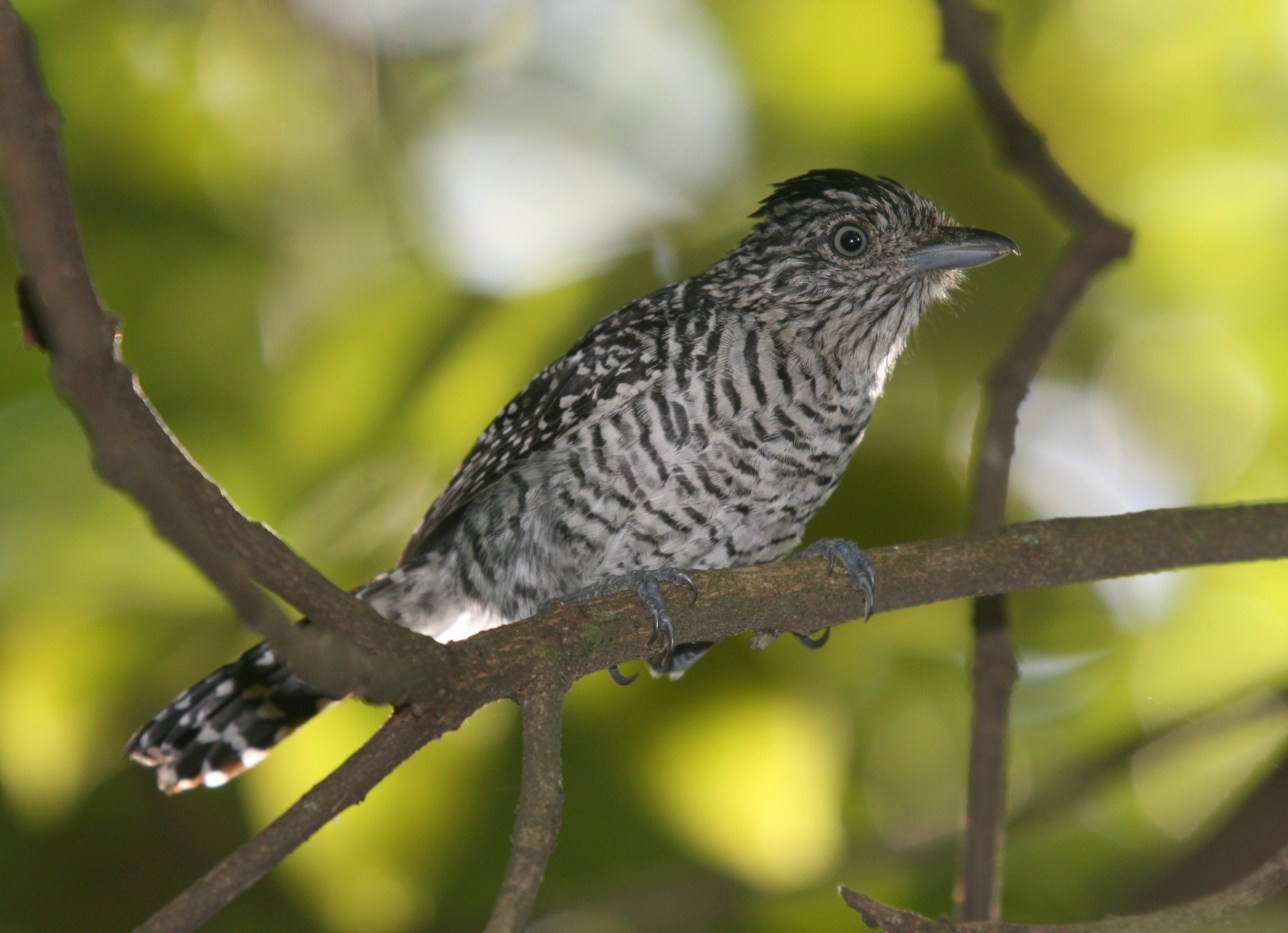
- Male in Goiás, Brazil

Conservation status
- Least Concern (IUCN 3.1)

Scientific classification
- Kingdom: Animalia
- Phylum: Chordata
- Class: Aves
- Order: Passeriformes
- Family: Thamnophilidae
- Genus: Thamnophilus
- Species: T. doliatus

Binomial name
- Thamnophilus doliatus (Linnaeus, 1764)

Synonyms
- Lanius doliatus Linnaeus, 1764

Audio
- Duet of pair from Carara National Park, Costa Rica

= Barred antshrike =

Species of bird

The barred antshrike (Thamnophilus doliatus) is a passerine bird in subfamily Thamnophilinae of family Thamnophilidae, the "typical antbirds". It is found in the Neotropics in Mexico, every country in Central America, Trinidad and Tobago, and every mainland South American country except Chile and Uruguay. There is also one accepted record from southern Texas.

== Taxonomy and systematics ==
The barred antshrike was described by the Swedish naturalist Carl Linnaeus in 1764 and given the binomial name Lanius doliatus. The type locality was subsequently designated as Surinam. The specific epithet is from Neo-Latin doliatus meaning "barred".

The barred antshrike has these 12 subspecies:

- T. d. intermedius Ridgway, 1888
- T. d. nesiotes Wetmore, 1970
- T. d. eremnus Wetmore, 1957
- T. d. nigricristatus Lawrence, 1865
- T. d. albicans Lafresnaye, 1844
- T. d. nigrescens Lawrence, 1867
- T. d. tobagensis Hartert, EJO & Goodson, 1917
- T. d. doliatus (Linnaeus, 1764)
- T. d. difficilis Hellmayr, 1903
- T. d. capistratus Lesson, RP, 1840
- T. d. radiatus Vieillot, 1816
- T. d. cadwaladeri Bond, J & Meyer de Schauensee, 1940

Subspecies T. d. capistratus was proposed as a separate species but the data presented confirmed its treatment as a subspecies of the barred antshrike.

What is now Chapman's antshrike (T. azrumae) was for a time treated as a subspecies of the barred antshrike.

== Description ==
The barred antshrike is 15 to 18.5 cm (5.9 to 7.3 in) long and weighs 24 to 32 g (0.85 to 1.1 oz). Members of genus Thamnophilus are largish members of the antbird family; all have stout bills with a hook like those of true shrikes. This species exhibits marked sexual dimorphism though both sexes have a bushy crest. Adult males of the nominate subspecies T. d. doliatus are almost entirely plumaged with alternating black and white bars. The black bars on their upperparts are thicker than the white bars; on their underparts the black bars are thinner than the white ones. Their face, throat, and chin have thin black and white streaks. Their crest is black with white bases on the middle feathers. Adult females have a cinnamon-rufous crest and upperparts. The sides of their head and neck are streaked black and white or buff. Their chin is buff and their underparts ochraceous-buff. Adults of both sexes have a pale yellow iris, a black maxilla, a bluish gray mandible, and lead-gray legs and feet. Juvenile males are barred with black and light yellowish brown.

The other subspecies of the barred antshrike differ from the nominate and each other thus:

- T. d. intermedius: males are darker and have wider black bars than the nominate
- T. d. nigricristatus: males' bellies have faint or no bars; females have unstreaked throats
- T. d. nesiotes: similar to nigricristatus but more deeply colored
- T. d. eremnus: similar to nigricristatus but more deeply colored
- T. d. albicans: males have a white belly and few bars on their underparts; females have a white throat and pale underparts
- T. d. nigrescens: very dark, with all black bars wider than the white ones
- T. d. tobagensis: males have whiter underparts and females darker underparts than the nominate
- T. d. radiatus: males have white spots on the forehead, whiter underparts than the nominate, and few to no black bars on the belly
- T. d. difficilis: males are similar to radiatus with a whiter forehead and grayer underparts
- T. d. capistratus: males have an entirely black crown and white spots on the tail. Females' throats are streaked, their breast is faintly barred, and their bellies are white. Both sexes have reddish or chestnut irises. (These differences led Assis et al to propose it as a species)
- T. d. cadwaladeri: males are paler than the nominate with minimal barring on the belly; females have mostly white underparts with buff on the sides and breast

== Distribution and habitat ==
The subspecies of the barred antshrike are found thus:

- T. d. intermedius: from San Luis Potosí and Tamaulipas in east-central Mexico south on both sides of Central America through Costa Rica and possibly into Panama
- T. d. nesiotes: Pearl Islands in the Gulf of Panama
- T. d. eremnus: Coiba Island off the Pacific coast of western Panama
- T. d. nigricristatus: Panama between eastern Chiriquí Province and western Guna Yala (San Blas)
- T. d. albicans: Caribbean slope of northern and western Colombia and south in the Magdalena Valley
- T. d. nigrescens: north-central Colombia east of the Andes and northwestern Venezuela north of the Andes
- T. d. tobagensis: Tobago
- T. d. doliatus: northeastern Colombia, Venezuela except its northwest but including Margarita Island, Trinidad, the Guianas, and northern Amazonian Brazil
- T. d. difficilis: east-central Brazil roughly bounded by eastern Maranhão, eastern Mato Grosso, Goiás, and western Bahia
- T. d. capistratus: eastern Brazil between Ceará, Bahia, and the Atlantic
- T. d. radiatus: Amazonas Department in southeastern Colombia, northeastern Ecuador, eastern Peru, northern and eastern Bolivia, most of Paraguay, northern and northeastern Argentina, and western and south-central Brazil
- T. d. cadwaladeri: Tarija Department in southern Bolivia

The barred antshrike inhabits a variety of landscapes with some geographical differences. In all areas it favors thick undergrowth rather than higher parts of the habitat and shuns the interior of mature forest. In Mexico, Central America, northern South America, and much of Peru it inhabits scrublands (especially second-growth), riparian thickets, the edges of dry woodlands and secondary forest, and even gardens. The exceptions are T. d. eremnus, which inhabits tropical deciduous forest on Coiba Island, T. d. tobagensis, which inhabits mature humid forest on Tobago, and T. d. capistratus, which primarily inhabits caatinga and restinga in eastern Brazil. In eastern Colombia the species often occurs on river islands, and in Ecuador, northern Peru, and much of Brazilian Amazonia it occurs almost exclusively on them. In Brazil it also is found on the "mainland" along rivers. In southern Bolivia, Paraguay, and Argentina it adds savanna to the scrub, secondary forest, and riverine belts. In Mexico, Central America, and Colombia it is found from sea level or near it to 1,500 m (4,900 ft). In Venezuela it reaches 2,000 m (6,600 ft) though most records are below 1,250 m (4,100 ft); in Peru it reaches 1,400 m (4,600 ft). In Ecuador it is found only below 250 m (800 ft).

== Behavior ==
=== Movement ===
The barred antshrike is a year-round resident throughout its range.

=== Feeding ===
The barred antshrike has a cosmopolitan diet. It primarily feeds on a wide variety of mature and larval insects but also includes significant amounts of other arthropods, small lizards, fruit, and seeds. It typically forages in pairs that remain close together in dense foliage from the ground to about 3 m (10 ft) above it, but will go as high as 10 m (35 ft). It almost never joins mixed-species feeding flocks. It hops and makes wing-assisted jumps up from the ground and between branches, and also climbs branches and vines. It usually gleans prey from leaves, stems, branches, and trunks using a rapid stabbing motion. It also feeds on prey that flees army ant swarms.

=== Breeding ===
The barred antshrike is monagamous and pairs vigorously defend year-round territories. In one study the territories were about 2,500 to 4,200 m^{2} (0.62 to 1.0 acre). The species' breeding season varies considerably across its large range, and every month of the year is represented somewhere. In Trinidad and Tobago it apparently breeds at any time of year. The species' nest is a tightly woven, though thin-walled, open cup made of fungal and vegetable fibers, vines, grasses, and twigs. It is usually suspended by its rim from a branch fork up to 10 m (35 ft) above the ground, though the heights appear to vary geographically. Both sexes build the nest. Their usual clutch size is two eggs, though three have been reported on Trinidad. Both parents incubate during the day but only the female at night. In a Costa Rican study the eggs were laid a day apart and the incubation period was 13 days after the second egg. In studies in other countries the time from hatch to fledging was 10 to 13 days. Both parents brood and provision nestlings.

=== Vocalization ===
Both sexes of the barred antshrike sing; while singing they stretch their neck, bow forward, and pump their tails up and down. Males erect their crest, which shows the feathers' white bases in the subspecies that have them. The species' song or songs have not been extensively studied across its range, but the general pattern is "a long series of loud chuckling or cackling notes that rapidly ascend with increasing intensity, and then descend, ending with an emphatic final note". Fagan and Komar, writing about the birds of northern Central America, describe it as "wha-wha-Wha-WHA-WHA-WHA-WHA'WHA'WHA'WHA'WHA'WHA-WRAY!". Schulenberg et al. for Peru write it as "kyuh kya-kya-kya-kya'ko'kokoWAH!". Ridgely and Greenfield for Ecuador write it as "hah-ha-ha-hahahahahahahaha-hánh".

The barred antshrike's calls vary among the subspecies, though a "crow-like caw" seems to be nearly universal though its function is not known. Some other calls include "growling or guttural calls [and] a short nasal 'nah!' ", "a nasal, strained cuee, ueee, ueee [and] a low growl, graaaaa", and "a nasal AW and a mewing whistled wheeu".

== Status ==
The IUCN has assessed the barred antshrike as being of Least Concern. It has an extremely large range and its estimated population of at least 50 million mature individuals is believed to be stable. No immediate threats have been identified. "One of the largest challenges facing Barred Antshrike survival is deforestation, habitat destruction and habitat fragmentation. Although Barred Antshrikes inhabit scrub and edge forest, they also establish large populations in Neotropical dry forest, arguably the most threatened of all tropical habitats."

== Gallery ==
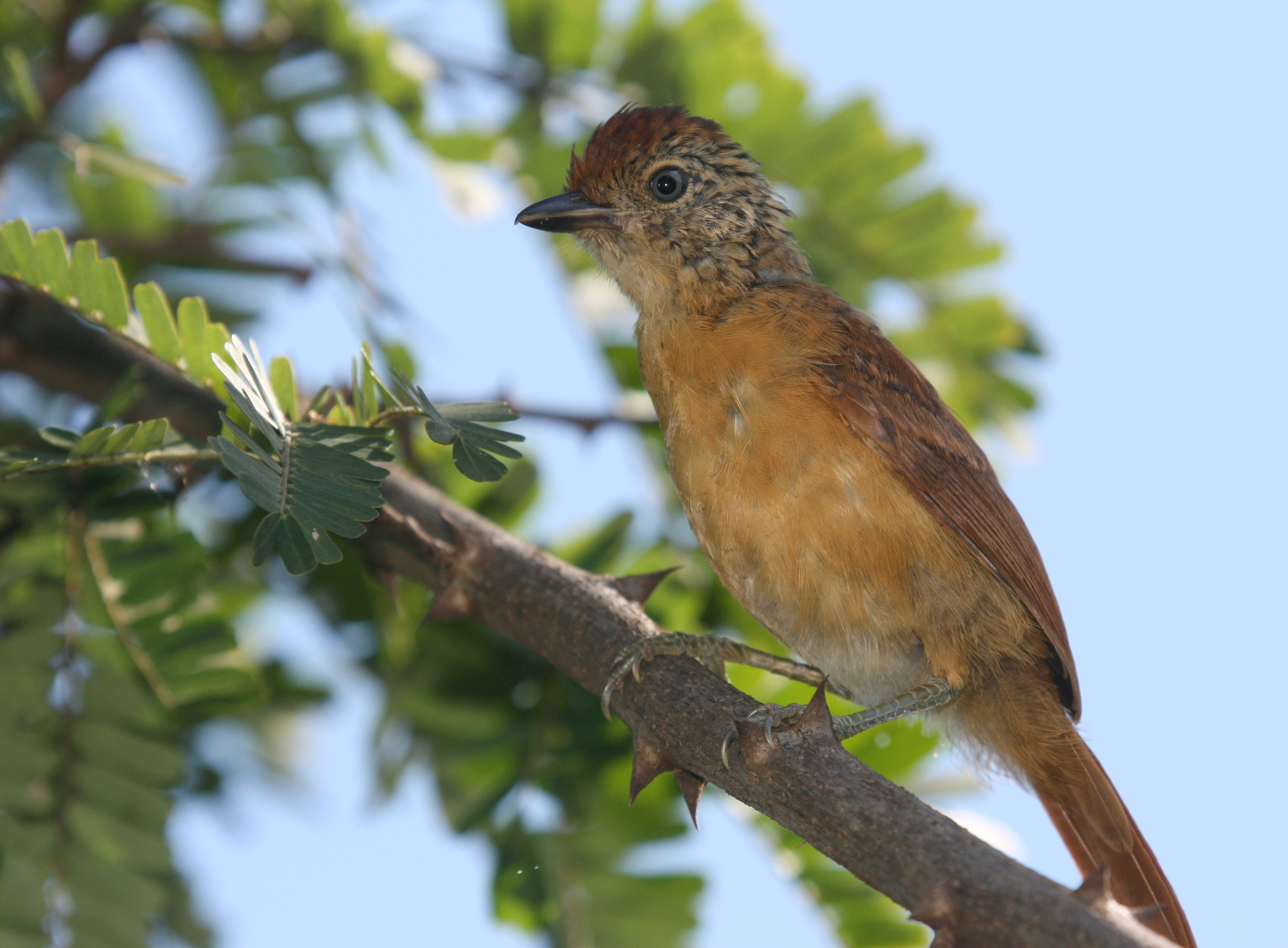
Juvenile female in Goias, Brazil

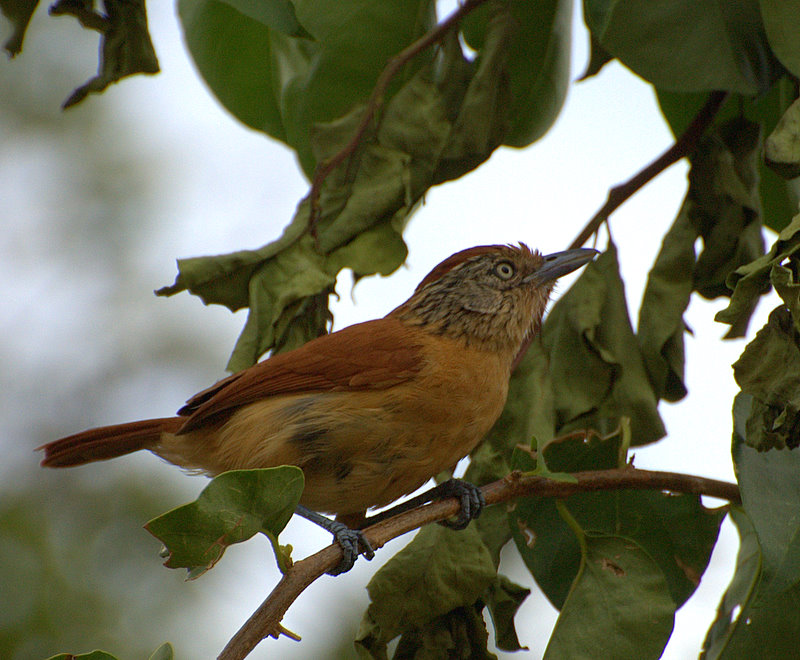
Female, Brazil

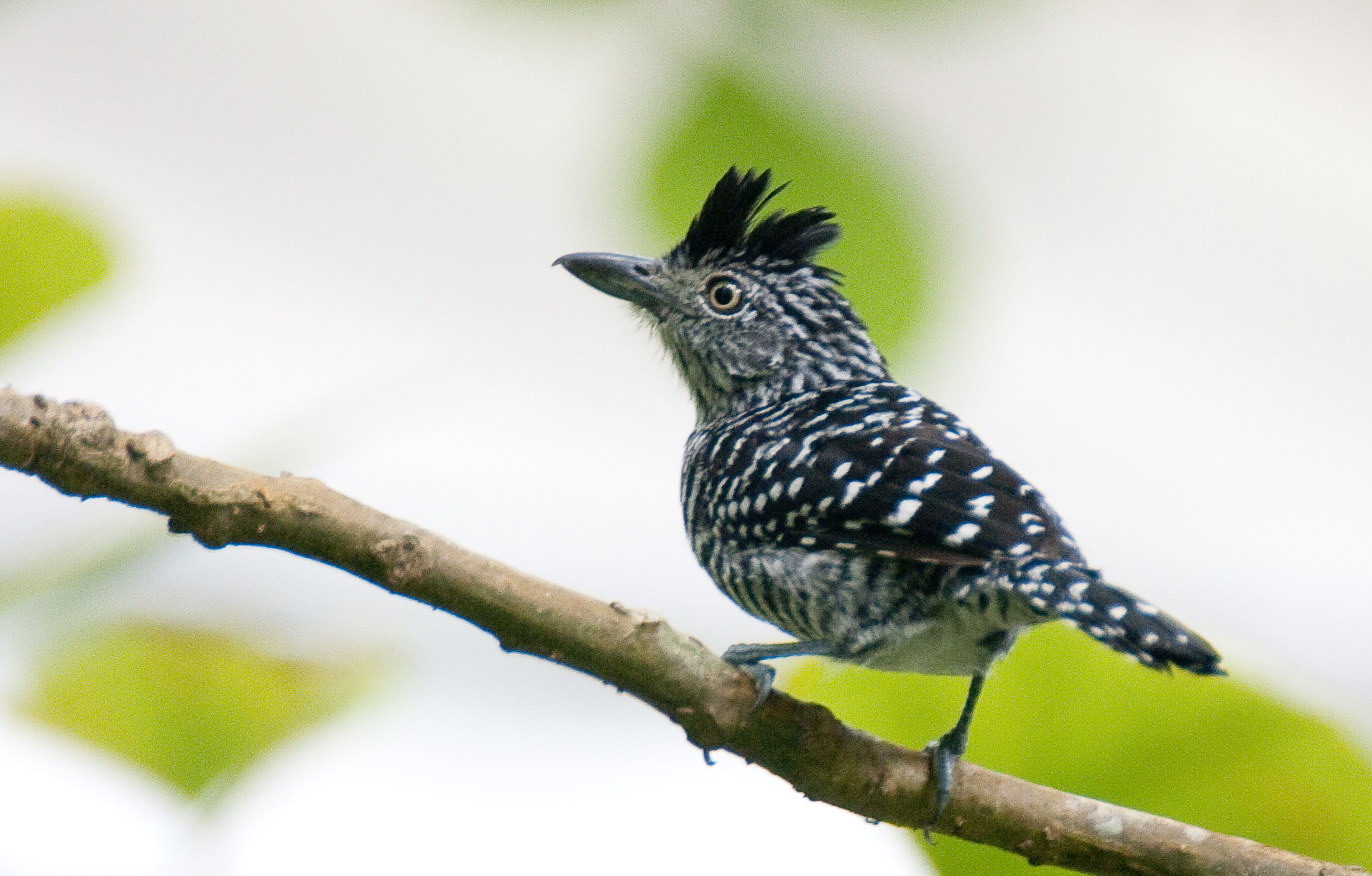
Male in Panama

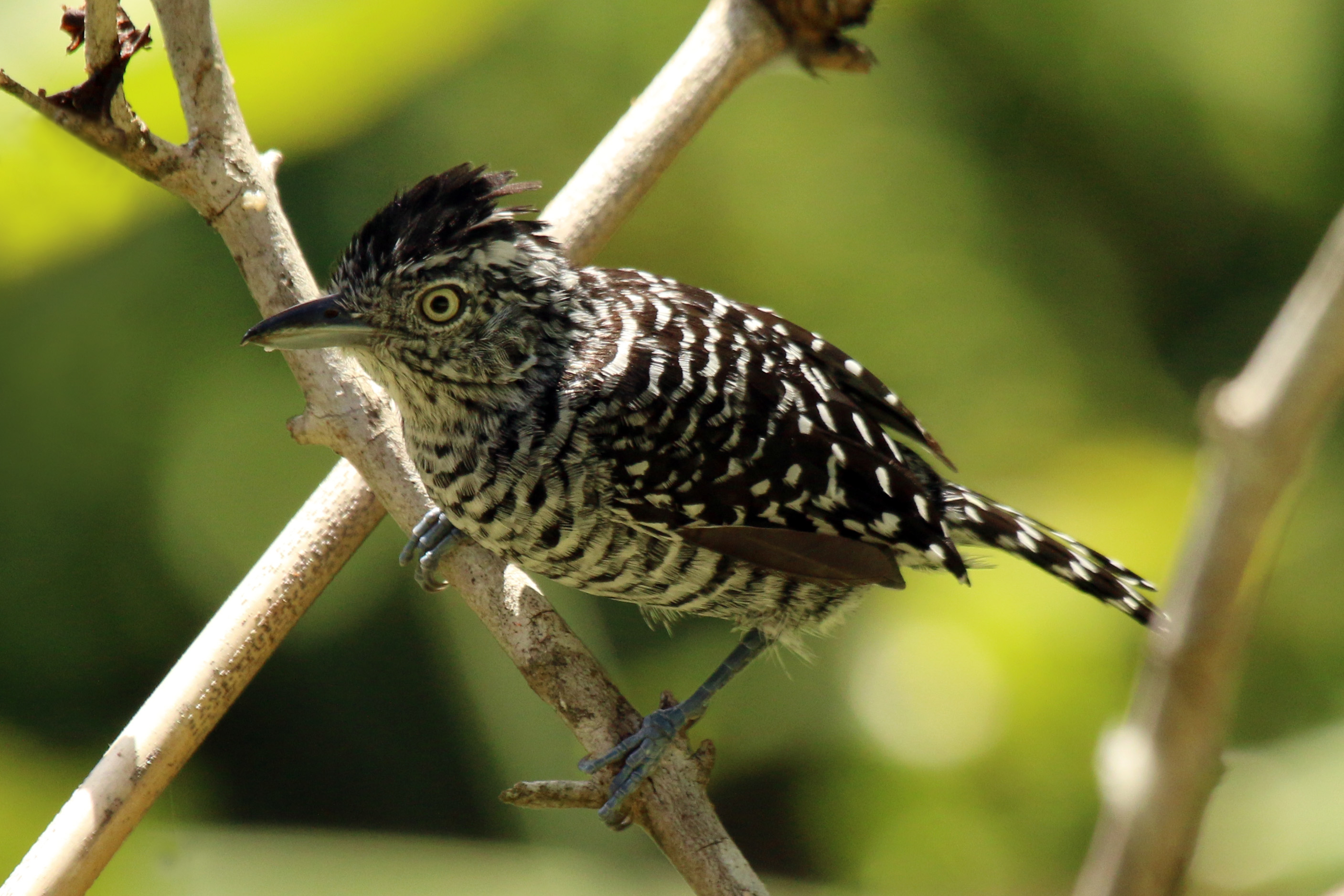
Male T. d. tobagensis, Tobago

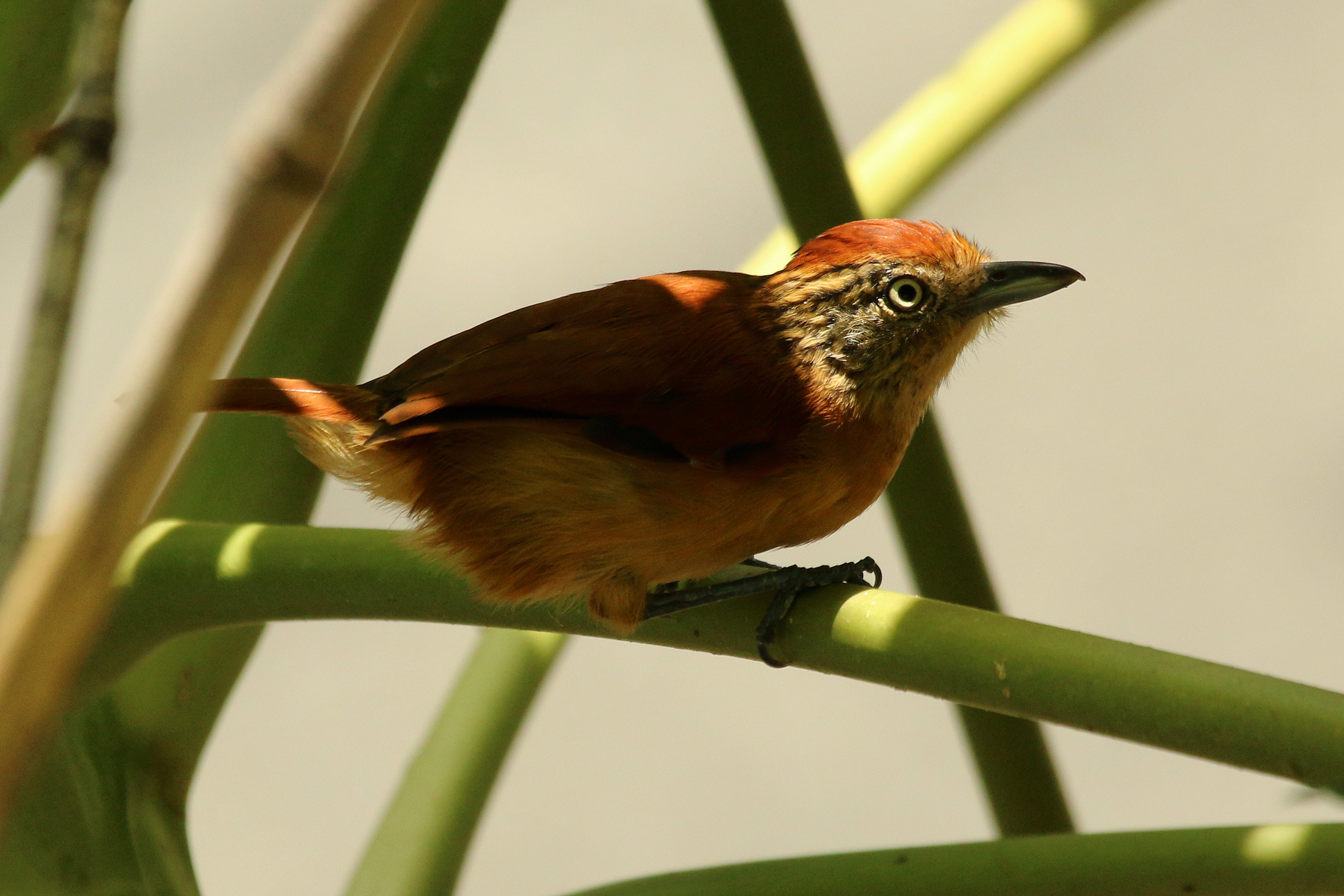
Female T. d. tobagensis, Tobago

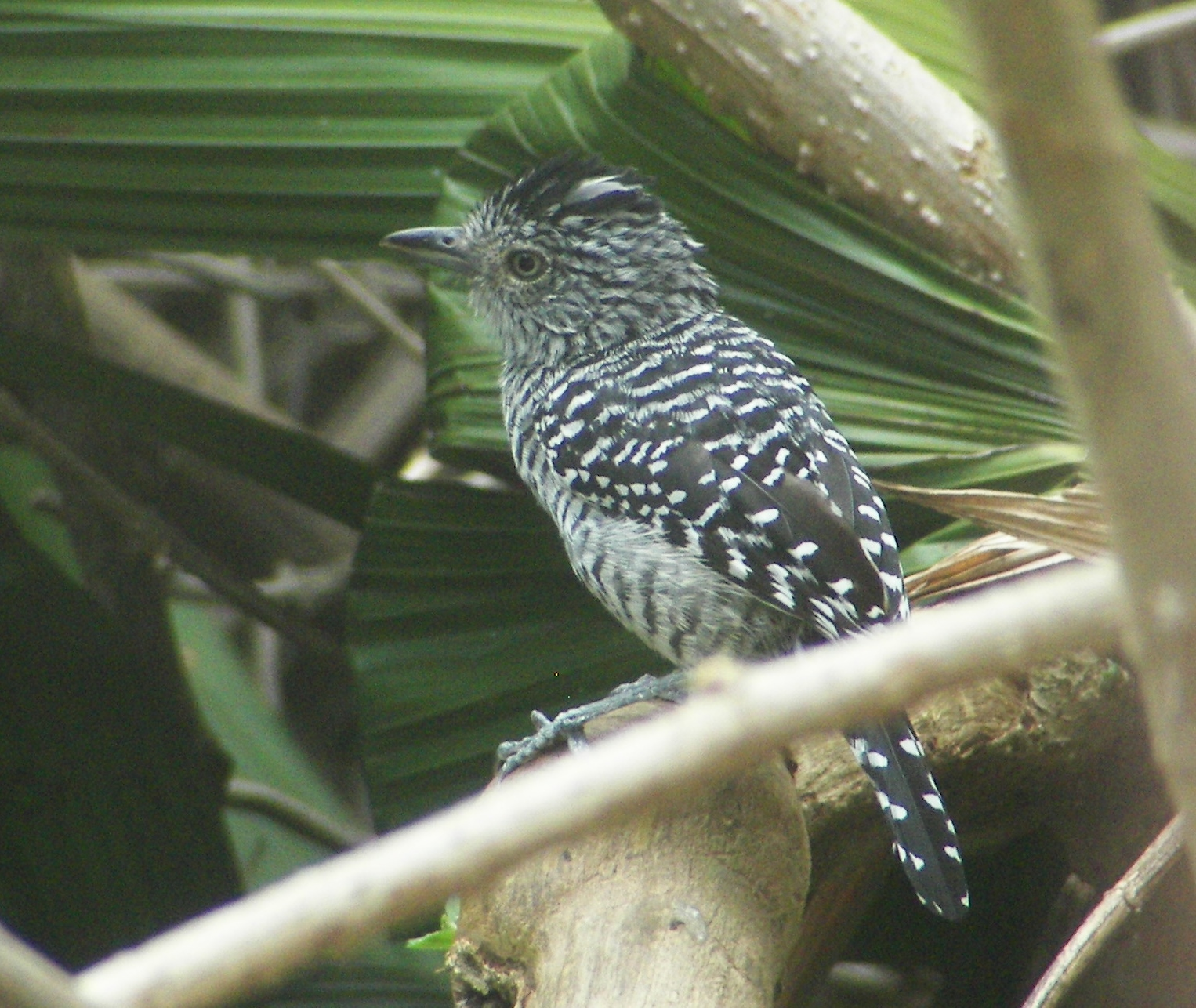
Male, Henri Pittier National Park, Venezuela
