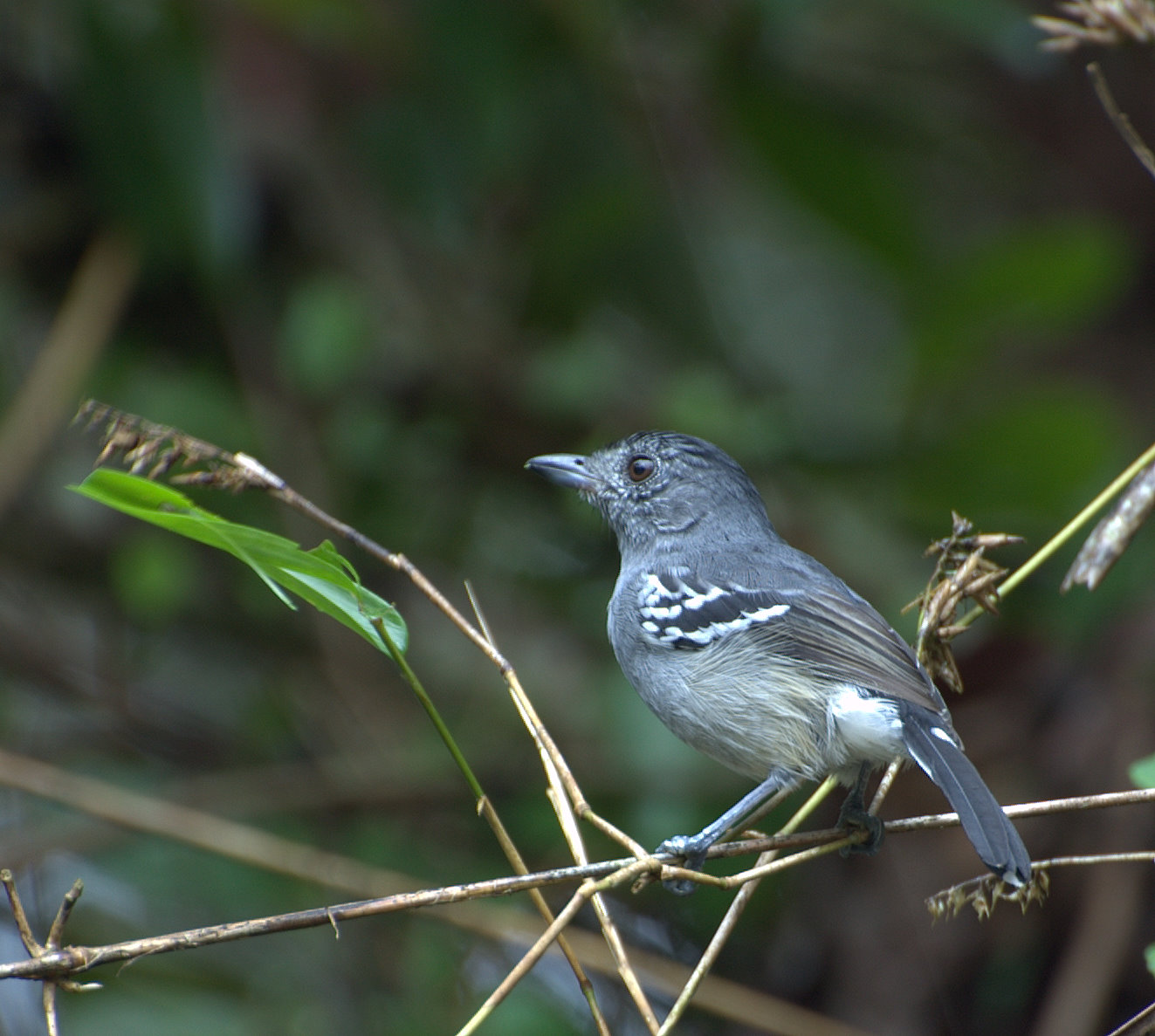
- Male T. c. caerulescens from São Paulo, Brazil

Conservation status
- Least Concern (IUCN 3.1)

Scientific classification
- Kingdom: Animalia
- Phylum: Chordata
- Class: Aves
- Order: Passeriformes
- Family: Thamnophilidae
- Genus: Thamnophilus
- Species: T. caerulescens

Binomial name
- Thamnophilus caerulescens Vieillot, 1816

Synonyms
- Thamnophilus pernambucensis

= Variable antshrike =

Species of bird

The variable antshrike (Thamnophilus caerulescens) is a species of bird in subfamily Thamnophilinae of family Thamnophilidae, the "typical antbirds". It is found in Argentina, Bolivia, Brazil, Paraguay, Peru, and Uruguay.

== Taxonomy and systematics ==
The variable antshrike was described by the French ornithologist Louis Pierre Vieillot in 1816 and given its current binomial name Thamnophilus caerulescens.

Major taxonomic systems assign these eight subspecies to the variable antshrike:

- T. c. melanchrous Sclater, PL & Salvin, 1876
- T. c. aspersiventer d'Orbigny & Lafresnaye, 1837
- T. c. dinellii Berlepsch, 1906
- T. c. paraguayensis Hellmayr, 1904
- T. c. gilvigaster Pelzeln, 1868
- T. c. caerulescens Vieillot, 1816
- T. c. ochraceiventer Snethlage, E, 1928
- T. c. cearensis (Cory, 1919)

The variable antshrike's highly variable plumage, some variations in the voice, and its unusual distribution have resulted in widespread speculations that it involves more than one species. Studies involving mtDNA and voice of the Bolivian populations, which is a meeting point for several of the distinctly different subspecies, did not support the theory of several species, instead suggesting that much of the vocal variation is clinal. and geneflow between various populations remains uninterrupted. Subspecies T. c. cearensis in northeastern Brazil, which also is relatively distinctive, was not included in these studies, and it therefore remains unclear if it is worthy of species recognition. Another problem relates to the variations within subspecies. The subspecies dinellii and cearensis, for example, are both variable, resulting in some authors proposing additional subspecies within the widely accepted eight.

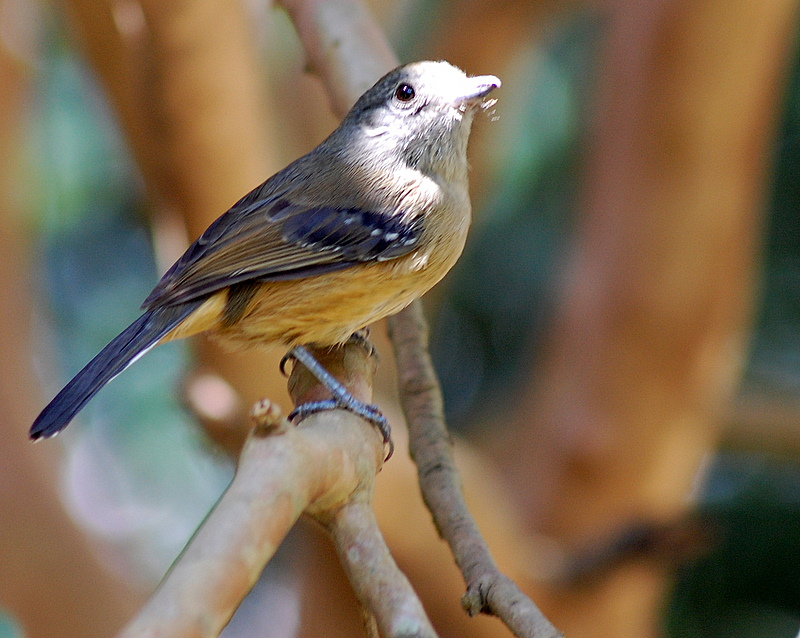
Female T. c. caerulescens from São Paulo, Brazil

== Description ==
The variable antshrike, as its common name suggests, is arguably the species of antbird with the most variable plumage. It is 14 to 16 cm (5.5 to 6.3 in) long and weighs 15 to 24 g (0.53 to 0.85 oz). Members of genus Thamnophilus are largish members of the antbird family; all have stout bills with a hook like those of true shrikes. This species exhibits significant sexual dimorphism as well as the differences among subspecies. Adult males of the nominate subspecies T. c. caerulescens have a black crown and nape and a gray face. Their upperparts are dark gray with some black on the lower back and a white patch between the scapulars. Their outer scapulars are black with white edges, their wing coverts black with white spots, and their flight feathers blackish brown with pale brown and white edges. Their tail is brownish black with white tips on the feathers. Their underparts are gray with a somewhat lighter belly, and often have faint scalloping. Adult females have an olive-brown crown. Their upperparts are mostly olive-brown with a tinge of clay color and yellow-brown edges on the uppertail coverts. They have little or no white between the scapulars. Their wing coverts are very dark brown with white edges on their tips and their flight feathers are dark brown with clay edges. Their tail feathers are dark brown with small white tips. Their throat and upper breast are ochraceous-gray and the rest of their underparts cinnamon-tawny with an olive tinge on the lower breast and sides. Subadults resemble adult females but are more buffy.

The other subspecies of the variable antshrike differ from the nominate and each other thus:

- T. c. melanchrous: Males are mostly black with some gray mixed on the rump, belly, and crissum, white edges on their primaries, and small white spots on their tail feathers. Females have an olive-gray forehead and nape and a black crown, very small spots on their wing coverts, and cinnamon-tawny belly and crissum.
- T. c. aspersiventer: Both sexes are similar to melanchrous. In addition males have black and white scallops on their belly and crissum and larger white spots on their tail. Females have a dark olive-gray crown with blackish spots.
- T. c. dinellii: Males' underparts vary from mostly cinnamon to cinnamon only on the crissum with a blackish throat and breast. Females have ochraceous gray crown and upperparts, yellow-brown flight feathers, light gray throat and upper breast with a faint yellow tinge, and pale cinnamon belly and crissum.
- T. c. paraguayensis: Both sexes are paler than the nominate. Males have white or buff-tinged white belly and crissum. Females have an olive-gray crown, olive-gray wing coverts with white tips and in some areas blackish spots, and white underparts with variable intensity of a yellowish brown tinge.
- T. c. gilvigaster: Males have clay-colored edges to their flight feathers, gray throat, breast, and upper belly, and gray lower belly and crissum with a cinnamon-tawny wash. Females are yellowish gray from their throat to upper belly and cinnamon-tawny lower belly and crissum.
- T. c. ochraceiventer: Males have a clay tinge to their upperparts and flight feathers, a gray throat, and grayish ochraceous underparts. Females have a black crown with some olive-gray on the forehead.
- T. c. cearensis: Males are similar to the nominate but with a lighter black crown and upperparts. Females have a rufous crown, ochraceous olive-brown wing coverts, a clay tinge on their tail, and a pale ochraceous throat.

== Distribution and habitat ==
The variable antshrike has a disjunct distribution, with subspecies T. c. cearensis being separate from the large contiguous range of the others. The subspecies are found thus:

- T. c. melanchrous: eastern slope of the Andes of Peru from south of the Marañón River in Amazonas Department south to northern Puno Department
- T. c. aspersiventer: southeastern Puno in Peru into west-central Bolivia north of the Andes to Santa Cruz Department
- T. c. dinellii: south and east of the Bolivian Andes from Santa Cruz south and into northwestern Argentina south to northern Córdoba Province and east to Formosa Province
- T. c. paraguayensis: eastern Santa Cruz in Bolivia, northwestern and north-central Paraguay, and Mato Grosso do Sul in Brazil
- T. c. gilvigaster: northeastern Argentina east of the Paraná River (except Misiones Province), southeastern Brazil from São Paulo state south, and most of Uruguay
- T. c. caerulescens: southeastern Paraguay, Misiones Province in Argentina, and southeastern Brazil between southeastern Bahia and western Paraná states
- T. c. ochraceiventer: east-central Brazil in southern Tocantins, Goiás, and south-central Bahia
- T. c. cearensis: Ceará, Pernambuco, Alagoas states in northeastern Brazil

The variable antshrike inhabits a variety of landscapes across its range that in general are evergreen forest, secondary woodland, and thickets in more open areas. In most areas it favors the edges rather than interior of denser forest. It shuns arid habitats. In the Andes of the northern part of its range it occurs in humid forest where it favors thickets and undergrowth, and in addition stunted forests on ridges, all at elevations between 1,200 and 2,800 m (3,900 and 9,200 ft). In the Andes further south and at lower elevations in northwestern Argentina it occurs in the understorey of somewhat open woodlands, scrublands along watercourses, and in heavy shrub cover on canyon hillsides at elevations between 200 and 2,700 m (700 and 8,900 ft). T. c. paraguayensis is a bird of the Gran Chaco, where it occurs in dense shrubs and low-stature woodlands along watercourses and in scrubby semi-deciduous forest at elevations between 150 and 850 m (500 and 2,800 ft). Subspecies T. c. gilvigaster occurs in thick woods along streams and in swampy areas from near sea level to about 1,050 m (3,400 ft). The nominate T. c. caerulescens mostly occurs on steep hillsides in forest heavy with vines and also is found in bamboo, vine tangles along streams, and in dense second growth. Locally it occurs in restinga on nutrient-poor soils. In elevation it ranges between sea level and 1,300 m (4,300 ft). T. c. ochraceiventer occurs in gallery forest and small woodlands between 750 and 1,350 m (2,500 and 4,400 ft). The non-contiguous subspecies T. c. cearensis is a bird of the Atlantic Forest where it occurs in vine-rich patches of humid and semi-humid forest up to about 850 m (2,800 ft).

== Behavior ==
=== Movement ===
There is evidence that some migration occurs in the southernmost part of the variable antshrike's range; it is presumed to be a year-round resident elsewhere.

=== Feeding ===
The variable antshrike's diet has not been detailed but is mostly insects and other arthropods; small amounts of seeds and fruits are also eaten. It usually forages singly and in pairs, mostly in the understorey to mid-storey between 1 and 5 m (3 and 16 ft) of the ground though sometimes as high as 8 m (26 ft). It often feeds in more open areas than many other antshrikes, though it also feeds in dense tangles of bamboo and vines. It hops and creeps through vegetation, gleaning prey from leaves, stems, vines, and branches by reaching and lunging from a perch. It has been observed dropping to pick prey from the surface of leaf litter. While foraging, it is regularly seen "dipping" its tail and flicking its wings. It often joins mixed-species feeding flocks and has been observed following army ant swarms.

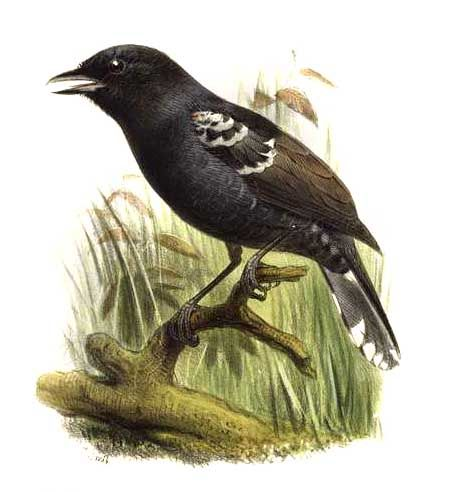
male T. c. melanochrous; illustration by Joseph Smit, 1876

=== Breeding ===
The variable antshrike's breeding seasons differ geographically. In Brazil it spans October to February, in Bolivia and Peru August to November, and in Argentina October to December. Nests vary somewhat but are in general a cup woven of plant fibers and fungal rhizomorphs, often with moss on the outside. Nests are suspended by their rim from a branch fork, often fairly low to the ground, and often partially to wholly hidden in vegetation. Where the clutch size is known it is usually three eggs though sometimes two. Both parents incubate the clutch during the day and both provision nestlings. The incubation period, time to fledging, and other details of parental care are not known. At least in Argentina, the shiny cowbird (Molothrus bonariensis) is a nest parasite. In an experiment food abundance was shown to influence several measures of reproductive effort, including clutch size.

=== Vocalization ===
The variable antshrike's song varies somewhat with geography but the differences are clinal. In general its song is "a simple countable series of usually 6–7 plaintive, evenly spaced whistles of same pitch and intensity". Variations include the pitch and intensity of the first and last notes and the song's pace. The song has been written as "nyah nyah nyah nyah" and "au-au-au-au". Its calls are "a descending aww" that is often doubled and "a low, growled bark"grrr".

== Status ==
The IUCN has assessed the variable antshrike as being of Least Concern. It has a very large range; its population size is not known and is believed to be decreasing. No immediate threats have been identified. It is considered fairly common across most of its range and occurs in several protected areas. "This species' adaptation to edge habitats, second-growth woodland and other human-created habitats makes it less sensitive to disturbance." "[H]owever, the conservation of race cearensis is of concern, since humid forest within its range has been largely reduced to remnant patches...surrounded by sugar cane and other large-scale agricultural development."
