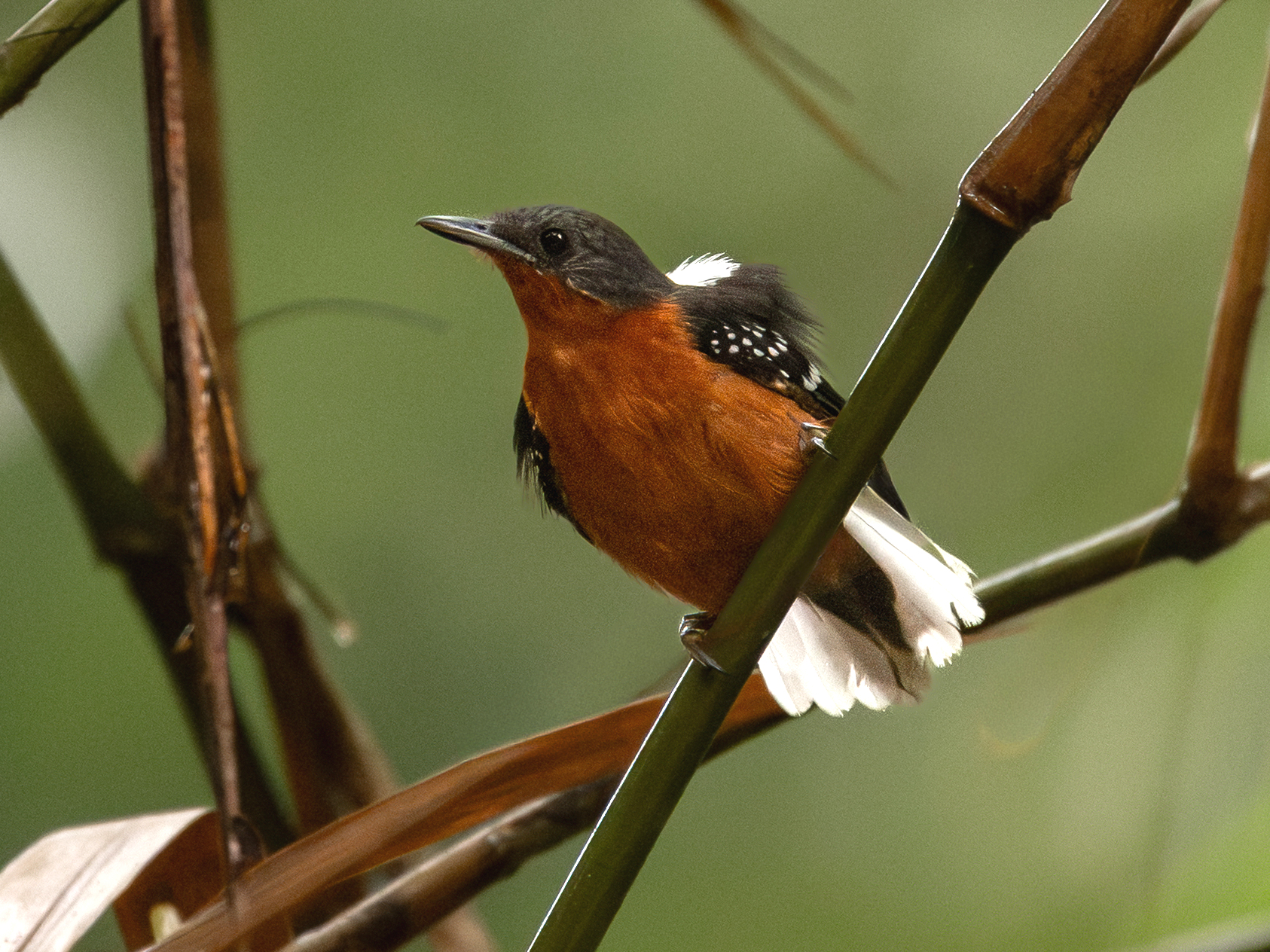
- Female at Porto Velho, Rondônia, Brazil
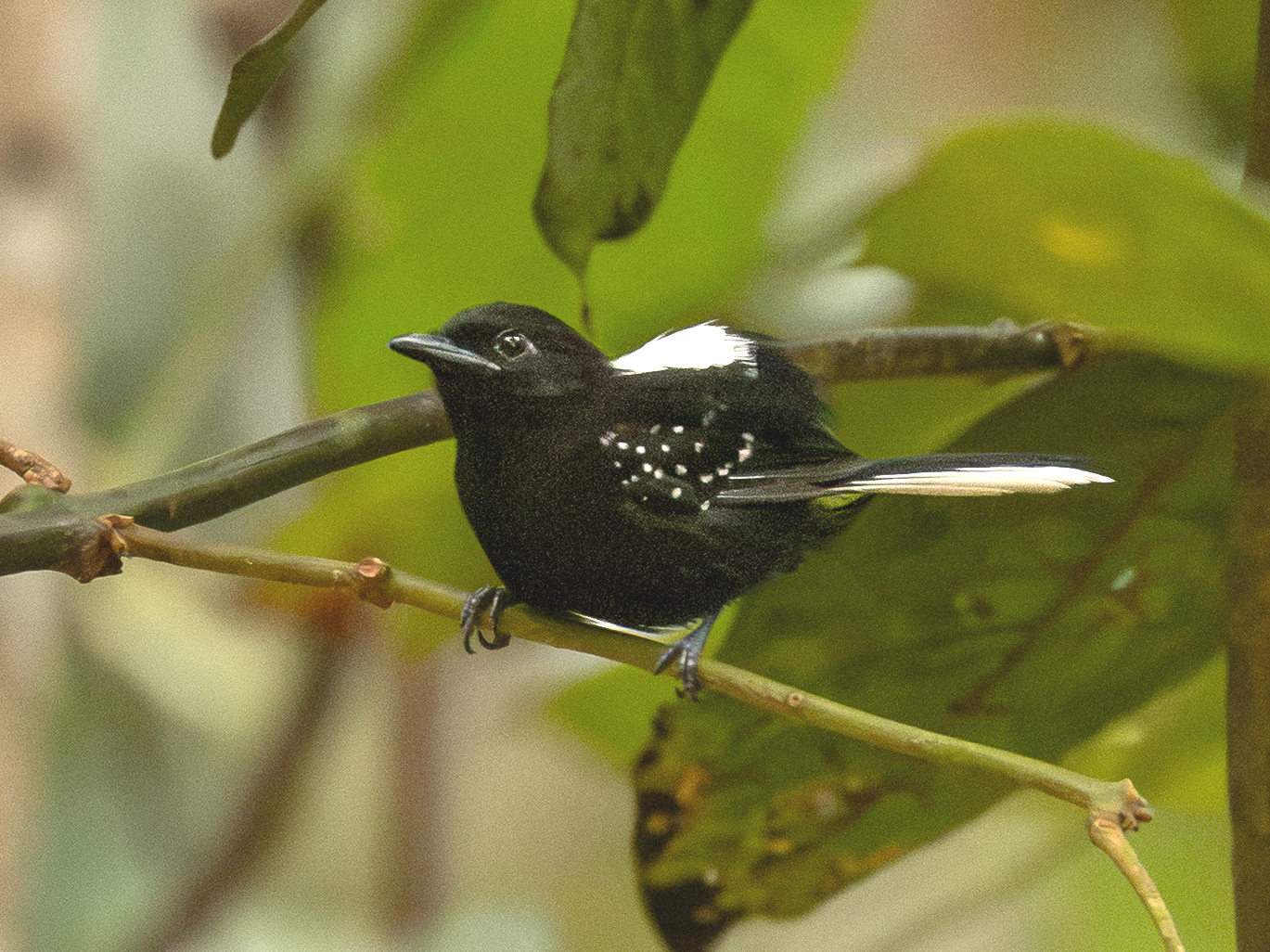
- Male

Conservation status
- Least Concern (IUCN 3.1)

Scientific classification
- Kingdom: Animalia
- Phylum: Chordata
- Class: Aves
- Order: Passeriformes
- Family: Thamnophilidae
- Genus: Microrhopias; P.L. Sclater, 1862
- Species: M. quixensis

Binomial name
- Microrhopias quixensis (Cornalia, 1849)

= Dot-winged antwren =

Species of bird

The dot-winged antwren (Microrhopias quixensis) or velvety antwren is a passerine bird in subfamily Thamnophilinae of family Thamnophilidae, the "typical antbirds". It is found in Mexico, every Central American country except El Salvador, Bolivia, Brazil, Colombia, Ecuador, French Guiana, Guyana, Peru, and Suriname.

== Taxonomy and systematics ==
The dot-winged antwren is the only member of genus Microrhopias, which was erected by the English zoologist Philip Sclater in 1862. It has these 10 subspecies:

- M. q. boucardi (Sclater, PL, 1858)
- M. q. virgatus (Lawrence, 1863)
- M. q. consobrina (Sclater, PL, 1860)
- M. q. quixensis (Cornalia, 1849)
- M. q. intercedens Zimmer, JT, 1932
- M. q. nigriventris Carriker, 1930
- M. q. albicauda Carriker, 1932
- M. q. microstictus (Berlepsch, 1908)
- M. q. bicolor (Pelzeln, 1868)
- M. q. emiliae Chapman, 1921

Several authors have suggested that some of the subspecies deserve recognition as species due to differences in plumage, voice, and habitat associations. The Clements taxonomy groups M. q. boucardi, M. q. virgatus, and M. q. consobrina as "Boucard's" dot-winged antwren. It also groups M. q. intercedens and M. q. albicauda as the "white-tailed" dot-winged antwren.

== Description ==
The dot-winged antwren is 10 to 12.5 cm (3.9 to 4.9 in) long and weighs 7.5 to 11.5 g (0.26 to 0.41 oz). The species has a long graduated tail. The sexes have different plumage. Adults of the nominate subspecies M. q. quixensis are mostly black. They have a partly concealed white patch between their shoulders. Their greater wing coverts have large white tips and the other coverts smaller ones. Their wing's underside shows additional white areas. Their flight feathers are dark gray with a brown tinge. Their central tail feathers are black and the rest have progressively larger white tips from inner to outer. Adult females have a blackish gray head and upperparts, a black throat, and rufous-chestnut underparts that is darkest on the breast. Their pattern of white on the wings and tail are like the male's.

The other subspecies of the dot-winged antwren differ from the nominate and each other thus:

- M. q. boucardi: smaller white tips on the tail than nominate; female's underparts are cinnamon with a rufous tinge
- M. q. virgatus: smaller white tips on the tail than nominate; female's underparts are cinnamon-rufous
- M. q. consobrina: smaller than nominate with larger white tail tips; female's underparts rufous-chestnut to rufous
- M. q. intercedens: larger white tips on tail feathers than nominate; female's upperparts blackish gray and throat and underparts rufous
- M. q. nigriventris: more white on wing coverts and outer tail feathers than nominate; female's breast deep chestnut and belly and undertail coverts black
- M. q. albicauda: smaller white spots on wing coverts than nominate, with more white on tail feathers and outermost almost entirely white; female's crown and upper back dark gray, with mostly cinnamon-rufous underparts and dark gray flanks
- M. q. microstictus: smaller white spots on wing coverts than nominate; female's throat and underparts rufous and flanks rufous with dark gray
- M. q. bicolor: larger white tips on tail feathers than nominate; female's upperparts dark gray and throat and underparts rufous
- M. q. emiliae: smaller white tips on tail than nominate; female's lower throat and upper breast chestnut-rufous and upper throat, lower breast, and belly black

Subspecies M. q. boucardi and M. q. virgatus intergrade in Honduras; they may form a single subspecies.

== Distribution and habitat ==
The subspecies of the dot-winged antwren are found thus:

- M. q. boucardi: from Veracruz and Oaxaca in Mexico east and south through Belize and eastern Guatemala into northern Honduras
- M. q. virgatus: from southeastern Honduras south through eastern Nicaragua and eastern Costa Rica into Panama as far as Panamá Province and Guna Yala (former San Blas); also Pacific slope of central and southern Costa Rica and locally on Panama's Pacific slope
- M. q. consobrina: from Panama's Guna Yala and Darién Province through north-central and western Colombia into Ecuador as far as Guayas Province
- M. q. quixensis: from southern Colombia's Putumayo and Caquetá departments south through eastern Ecuador into northeastern Peru to the Marañón and Amazon rivers
- M. q. intercedens: central Peru and southwestern Brazil south of the Amazon as far east as the Madeira River
- M. q. nigriventris: eastern Andes and foothills in central Peru between San Martín and Cuzco departments
- M. q. albicauda: from Peru's Ucayali Department southeast into northern Bolivia's Pando Department
- M. q. microstictus: the Guianas and northeast Amazonian Brazil's Roraima, extreme northern Pará, and Amapá
- M. q. bicolor: Amazonian Brazil south of the Amazon between the Madeira and Tapajós rivers and south to Rondônia and northwestern Mato Grosso
- M. q. emiliae: Amazonian Brazil south of the Amazon between the Tapajós and Tocantins rivers and south to extreme northern Mato Grosso

The dot-winged antwren inhabits somewhat different landscapes across its extremely large range. In general they are tropical evergreen and secondary forest heavily vegetated with vine tangles; the species favors edges and gaps but mostly not the interior of continuous forest. In northern Central America its habitat includes low semi-deciduous forest and some rainforest. In southern Central America it adds shaded cacao and guava plantations. In Ecuador and western Amazonia the species often favors stands of bamboo and várzea forest. In Mato Grosso subspecies M. q. bicolor most often occurs in gaps within terra firme forest. Subspecies M. q. emiliae is mostly associated with stands of Guadua bamboo.

== Behavior ==
=== Movement ===
The dot-winged antwren is thought to be a year-round resident throughout its range.

=== Feeding ===
The dot-winged antwren feeds almost entirely on arthropods. It seldom forages by itself, but usually in pairs or small family groups. It often joins mixed-species feeding flocks that pass through its territory but does not travel with them. It typically forages between about 3 and 10 m (10 and 35 ft) above the ground but will feed higher. It rarely attends army ant swarms but then will take prey from near and on the ground. It forages very actively, flutter-flying, hopping, and hitching up, along, and between trunks and branches. It gleans prey from live vegetation, stems, and vines while reaching, hanging, jumping up, or hovering to capture it.

=== Breeding ===
The dot-winged antwren's breeding season is well known only in Mexico, where it spans May to July, in Costa Rica (January to August), and in Panama (February to July). It is probably February to September in Suriname, apparently concludes in March to April in French Guiana, and is not known elsewhere. Its nest is a deep pouch of partially decayed leaves, fastened together and to a branch fork with cobwebs and plant fibers, and lined with plant fibers. It is typically between 4 and 7 m (15 and 25 ft) above the ground and hidden in foliage. The clutch size is two eggs. Both sexes contribute to nest building, incubation, and provisioning nestlings. The incubation period and time to fledging are not known.

=== Vocalization ===
Microrhopias quixensis - Dot-winged Antwren (Song)

The dot-winged antwren's song varies among the subspecies and sexes but is generally "an accelerating series of notes that shorten in length". It is described as a "slightly accelerating tip-tip-Tip-Tip-Tip-Tip-Tip-Tip-teu-teu-teu-teu'teu" in northern Central America and "a series of high, fast notes, which rise initially in pitch and intensity before descending" in Costa Rica. In Ecuador it sings "an accelerating and descending series of 5–10 semimusical whistled notes, e.g. 'wee, tsee-tsi-tsi-tis-tu-tu' ". Different populations in Brazil sing a "very high, sharp 'tu-Twée-Twée-tdrrr' (second part much higher and louder" or a "very high, loud, 'tutweetwee-tdrrrrr', 1st part slow and descending, followed by rattling 2nd part, which is longer and higher". Its calls include "a short, sharp, mostly downslurred note, often repeated over and over...[a] downslurred whine, downslurred complex, raspy call, and jumble of 'chip' and 'seet' notes".

== Status ==
The IUCN has assessed the dot-winged antwren as being of Least Concern. It has an extremely large range and an estimated population of at least 500,000 mature individuals; the latter is however believed to be decreasing. No immediate threats have been identified. It is "[f]airly common but patchily distributed" and occurs in many protected areas. "Existing parks and reserves are adequately distributed throughout the species' range, ensuring protection of all subspecies."
