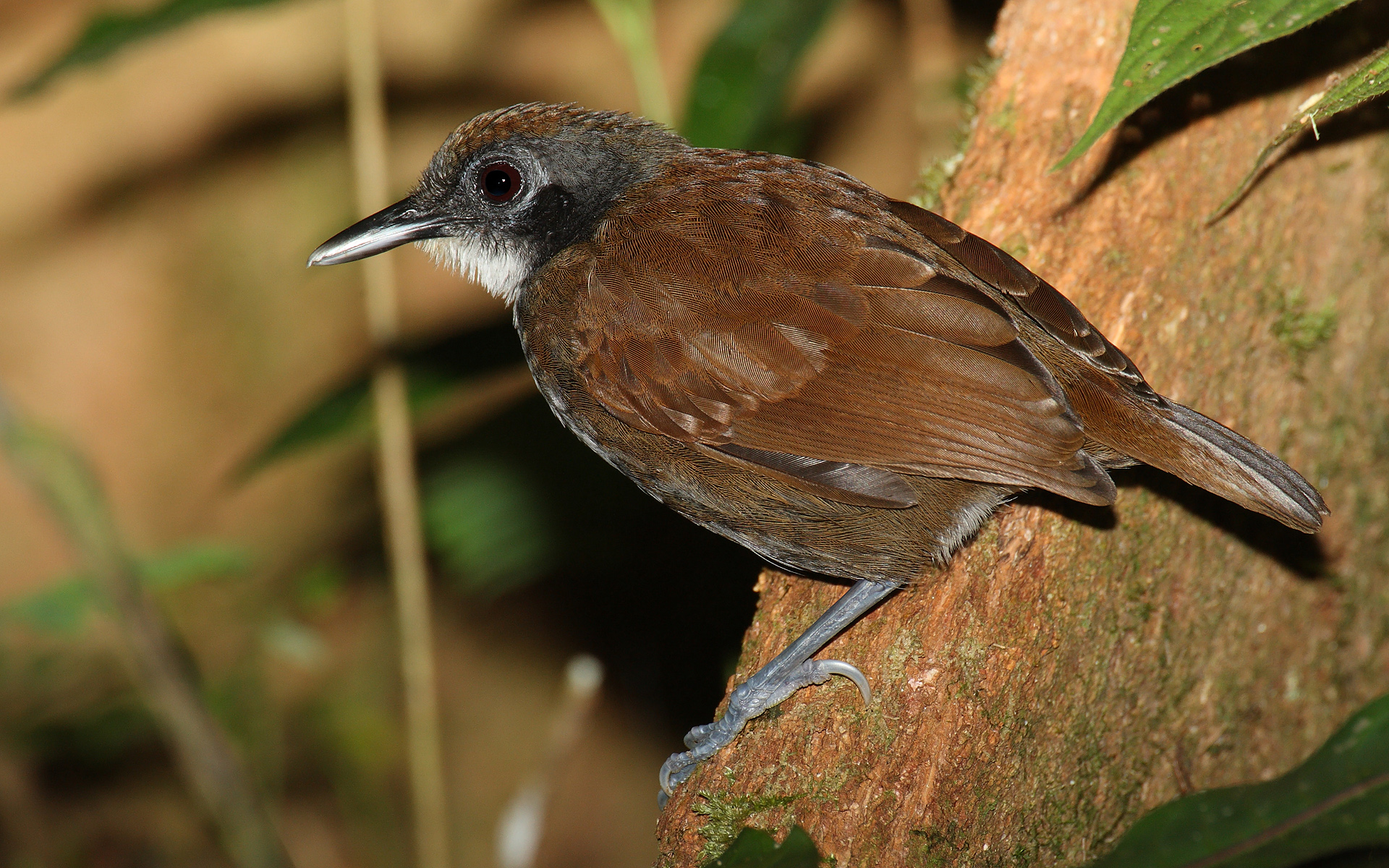
- Bicolored antbird Gymnopithys leucaspis

Scientific classification
- Kingdom: Animalia
- Phylum: Chordata
- Class: Aves
- Order: Passeriformes
- Parvorder: Furnariida
- Family: Thamnophilidae; Swainson, 1824

Diversity
- Some 63 genera, over 230 species
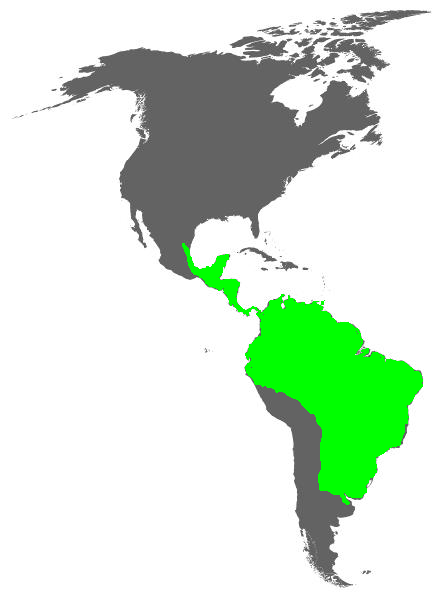
- Global range (in green)

= Antbird =

Antbirds

Passerine bird family found across subtropical and tropical Central and South America

The antbirds are a large passerine bird family, Thamnophilidae, found across subtropical and tropical Central and South America, from Mexico to Argentina. There are more than 230 species, known variously as antshrikes, antwrens, antvireos, fire-eyes, bare-eyes and bushbirds. They are related to the antthrushes and antpittas (family Formicariidae), the tapaculos, the gnateaters and the ovenbirds. Despite some species' common names, this family is not closely related to the wrens, vireos or shrikes.

Antbirds are generally small birds with rounded wings and strong legs. They have mostly sombre grey, white, brown and rufous plumage, which is sexually dimorphic in pattern and colouring. Some species communicate warnings to rivals by exposing white feather patches on their backs or shoulders. Most have heavy bills, which in many species are hooked at the tip.

Most species live in forests, although a few are found in other habitats. Insects and other arthropods form the most important part of their diet, although small vertebrates are occasionally taken. Most species feed in the understory and midstory of the forest, although a few feed in the canopy and a few on the ground. Many join mixed-species feeding flocks, and a few species are core members. To various degrees, around eighteen species specialise in following swarms of army ants to eat the small invertebrates flushed by the ants, and many others may feed in this way opportunistically.

Antbirds are monogamous, mate for life, and defend territories. They usually lay two eggs in a nest that is either suspended from branches or supported on a branch, stump, or mound on the ground. Both parents share the tasks of incubation and of brooding and feeding the nestlings. After fledging, each parent cares exclusively for one chick.

Thirty-eight species are threatened with extinction as a result of human activities. Antbirds are not targeted by either hunters or the pet trade. The principal threat is habitat loss, which causes habitat fragmentation and increased nest predation in habitat fragments.

== Systematics ==
The antbird family Thamnophilidae used to be considered a subfamily, Thamnophilinae, within a larger family Formicariidae that included antthrushes and antpittas. Formerly, that larger family was known as the "antbird family" and the Thamnophilinae were "typical antbirds". In this article, "antbird" and "antbird family" refer to the family Thamnophilidae.

Thamnophilidae was removed from Formicariidae, leaving behind the antthrushes and antpittas, due to recognition of differences in the structure of the breastbone (sternum) and syrinx, and Sibley and Ahlquist's examination of DNA–DNA hybridization. The Thamnophilidae antbirds are members of the infraorder Tyrannides (or tracheophone suboscines), one of two infraorders in the suborder Tyranni. The Thamnophilidae are now thought to occupy a fairly basal position within the infraorder, i. e. with regard to their relatives the antthrushes and antpittas, tapaculos, gnateaters, and also the ovenbirds. The sister group of the Thamnophilidae is thought to be the gnateaters. The ovenbirds, tapaculos, antthrushes and antpittas are thought to represent a different radiation of that early split.

The antbird family contains over 230 species, variously called antwrens, antvireos, antbirds and antshrikes. The names refer to the relative sizes of the birds (increasing in the order given, though with exceptions) rather than any particular resemblance to the true wrens, vireos or shrikes. In addition, members of the genus Phlegopsis are known as bare-eyes, Pyriglena as fire-eyes and Neoctantes and Clytoctantes as bushbirds. Although the systematics of the Thamnophilidae is based on studies from the mid-19th century, when fewer than half the present species were known, comparison of the myoglobin intron 2, GAPDH intron 11 and the mtDNA cytochrome b DNA sequences has largely confirmed it. There are two major clades – most antshrikes and other larger, strong-billed species as well as Herpsilochmus, versus the classical antwrens and other more slender, longer-billed species – and the monophyly of most genera was confirmed.

The Thamnophilidae contains several large or very large genera and numerous small or monotypic ones. Several, which are difficult to assign, seem to form a third, hitherto unrecognised clade independently derived from ancestral antbirds. The results also confirmed suspicions of previous researchers that some species, most notably in Myrmotherula and Myrmeciza, need to be assigned to other genera. Still, due to the difficulties of sampling from such a large number of often poorly known species, the assignment of some genera is still awaiting confirmation.

== Morphology ==
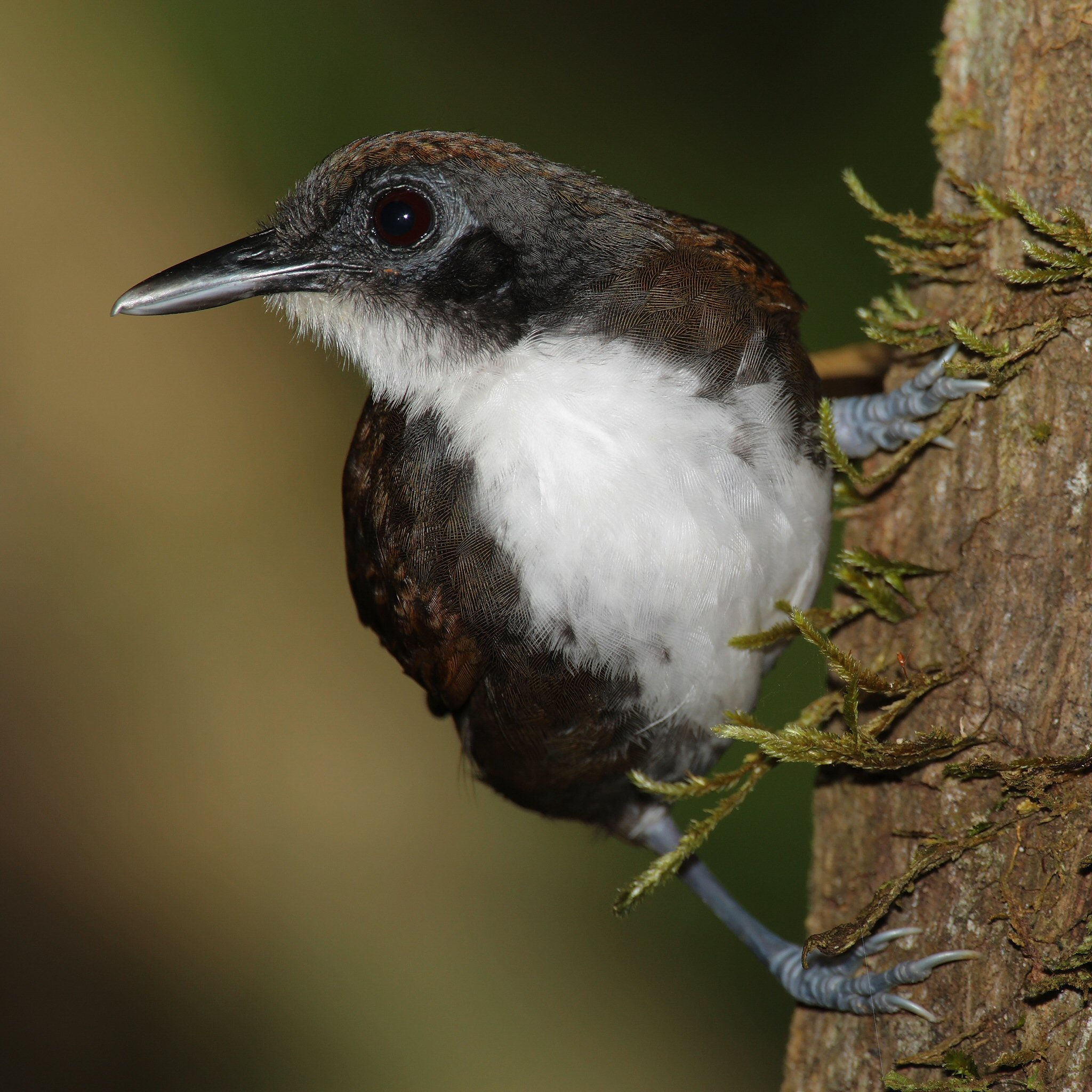
The legs and feet of ant-following antbirds are stable and adapted to gripping vertical stems and branches. The leg muscles of the bicoloured antbird make up 13 % of the total body weight.

The antbirds are a group of small to medium-sized passerines that range in size from the large giant antshrike, which measures 45 cm (18 in) and weighs 150 g (5.29 oz), to the tiny 8-cm (3 in) pygmy antwren, which weighs 7 g (0.25 oz). In general terms, "antshrikes" are relatively large-bodied birds, "antvireos" are medium-sized and chunky, while "antwrens" include most smaller species; "antbird" genera can vary greatly in size. Members of this family have short rounded wings that provide good manoeuvrability when flying in dense undergrowth. The legs are large and strong, particularly in species that are obligate ant-followers. These species are well adapted to gripping vertical stems and saplings, which are more common than horizontal branches in the undergrowth, and thus the ability to grip them is an advantage for birds following swarms of army ants. The claws of these antbirds are longer than those of species that do not follow ants, and the soles of some species have projections that are tough and gripping when the foot is clenched. Tarsus length in antbirds is related to foraging strategy. Longer tarsi typically occur in genera such as the Thamnophilus antshrikes that forage by perch-gleaning (sitting and leaning forward to snatch insects from the branch), whereas shorter tarsi typically occur in those that catch prey on the wing, such as the Thamnomanes antshrikes.

Most antbirds have proportionately large, heavy bills. Several genera of antshrike have a strongly hooked tip to the bill, and all antbirds have a notch or 'tooth' at the tip of the bill which helps in holding and crushing insect prey. The two genera of bushbirds have upturned chisel-like bills.

The plumage of antbirds is soft and not brightly coloured, although it is occasionally striking. The colour palette of most species is blackish shades, whitish shades, rufous, chestnut and brown. Plumages can be uniform in colour or patterned with barring or spots. Sexual dimorphism – differences in plumage colour and pattern between males and females – is common in the family. Overall the pattern within the family is for the males to have combinations of grey, black or white plumage and the females having buff, rufous and brown colours. For example, the male dot-winged antwren is primarily blackish, whereas the female has rust-coloured underparts. In some genera, such as Myrmotherula, species are better distinguished by female plumage than by male. Many species of antbirds have a contrasting 'patch' of white (sometimes other colours) feathers on the back (known as interscapular patches), shoulder or underwing. This is usually concealed by the darker feathers on the back but when the bird is excited or alarmed these feathers can be raised to flash the white patch. dot-winged antwrens puff out white back patches, whereas in bluish-slate antshrikes and white-flanked antwrens the white patch is on the shoulder.

=== Voice ===
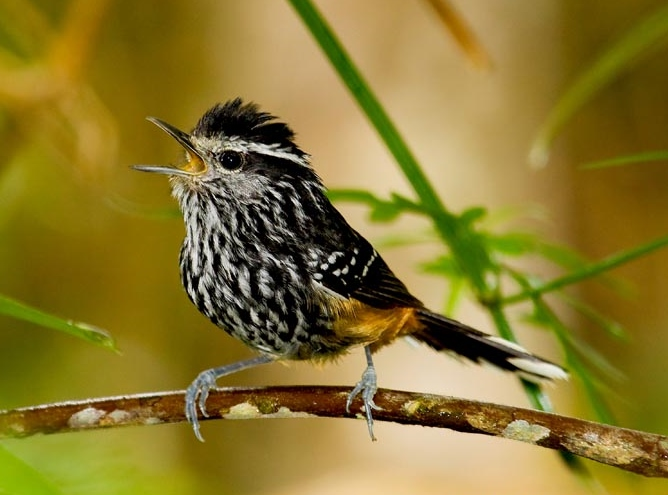
Ochre-rumped antbird calling

Song of the barred antshrike

The songs and calls of antbirds are generally composed of repeated simple uncomplicated notes. The family is one of the suboscines (suborder Tyranni) which have simpler syrinxes ("voiceboxes") than other songbirds. Nevertheless, their songs are distinctive and species-specific, allowing field identification by ear. Antbirds rely on their calls for communication, as is typical of birds in dark forests. Most species have at least two types of call, the loudsong and the softsong. The functions of many calls have been deduced from their context; for example some loudsongs have a territorial purpose and are given when birds meet at the edges of their territories, or during the morning rounds of the territory. Pairs in neighbouring territories judge the proximity of rivals by the degradation of the song caused by interference by the environment. In bouts of territorial defence the male will face off with the other male and the female with her counterpart. Loudsong duets are also potentially related to the maintenance of pair bonds. The functions of softsongs are more complex, and possibly related to pair-bond maintenance. In addition to these two main calls a range of other sounds are made; these include scolding in mobbing of predators. The calls of antbirds are also used interspecifically. Some species of antbirds and even other birds will actively seek out ant-swarms using the calls of some species of ant-followers as clues.

== Distribution and habitat ==
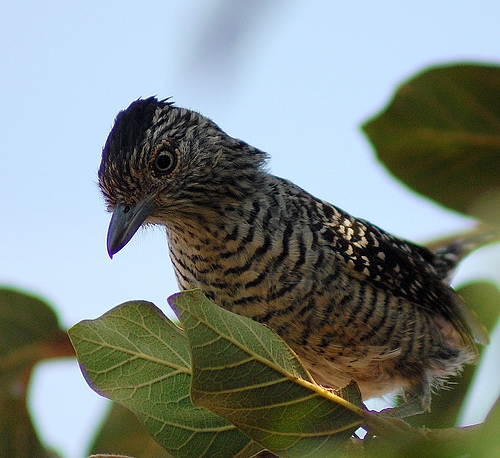
The barred antshrike is distributed from Mexico to Argentina. It has the hooked bill typical of the antshrikes.

The distribution of the antbirds is entirely Neotropical, with the vast majority of the species being found in the tropics. A few species reach southern Mexico and northern Argentina. Some species, such as the barred antshrike, have a continental distribution that spans most of the South and Middle American distribution of the family; others, such as the ash-throated antwren, have a tiny distribution.

Antbirds are mostly birds of humid lowland rainforests. Few species are found at higher elevations, with less than 10% of species having ranges above 2000 m (6500 ft) and almost none with ranges above 3000 m (10000 ft). The highest species diversity is found in the Amazon basin, with up to 45 species being found in single locations in sites across Brazil, Colombia, Bolivia and Peru. The number of species drops dramatically towards the further reaches of the family's range; there are only seven species in Mexico, for example. Areas of lower thamnophilid diversity may contain localised endemics, however. The Yapacana antbird, for example, is restricted to the stunted woodlands that grow in areas of nutrient-poor white-sand soil (the so-called Amazonian caatinga) in Brazil, Venezuela and Colombia. Some species are predominantly associated with microhabitats within a greater ecosystem; for example, the bamboo antshrike is predominantly found in bamboo patches.

Genetic comparison of the whole genomes of higher and lower-humidity antbirds have shown some differences in genes linked to water balance and temperature regulation. More significantly, antbirds differ in the regions of the genome that regulate gene activity, suggesting that differences for antbirds are a result less of the genes themselves than of how they are deployed.

== Behaviour ==
Antbirds are diurnal: they feed, breed and defend territories during the day. Many of the family are, however, reluctant to enter areas of direct sunlight where it breaks through the forest canopy. Antbirds will engage in anting, a behaviour in which ants (or other arthropods) are rubbed on the feathers before being discarded or eaten. While this has conventionally been considered a way to remove and control feather parasites, it has been suggested that for antbirds it may simply be a way to deal with the distasteful substances in prey items.

=== Feeding ===
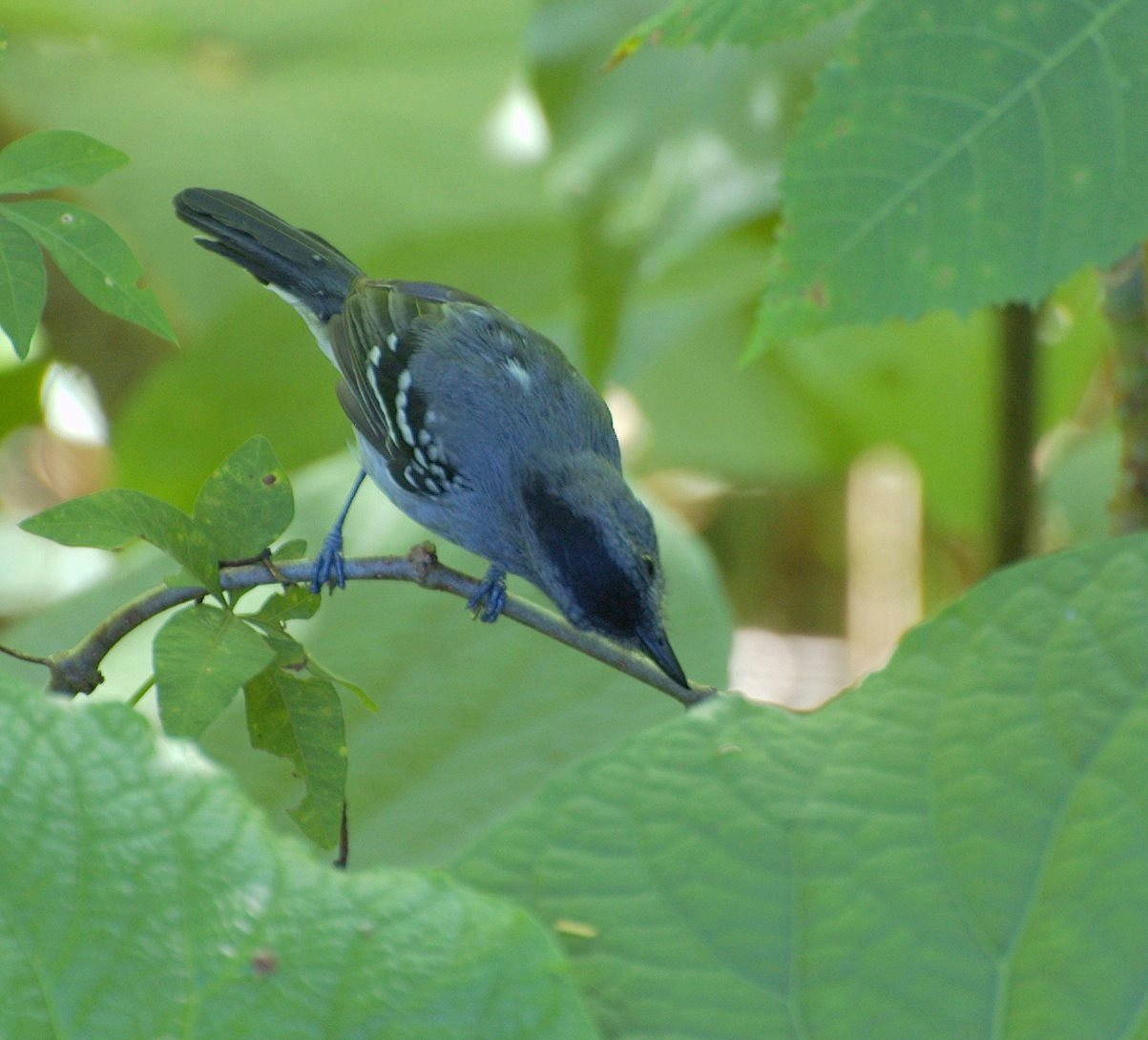
A variable antshrike gleaning insects from foliage

The main component of the diet of all antbirds is arthropods. These are mostly insects, including grasshoppers and crickets, cockroaches, praying mantises, stick insects and the larvae of butterflies and moths. In addition antbirds often take spiders, scorpions and centipedes. They swallow smaller prey items quickly, whereas they often beat larger items against branches in order to remove wings and spines. Larger species can kill and consume frogs and lizards as well, but generally these do not form an important part of the diet of this family. Other food items may also be eaten, including fruit, eggs and slugs.

The family uses a number of techniques to obtain prey. The majority of antbirds are arboreal, with most of those feeding in the understory, many in the middle story and some in the canopy. A few species feed in the leaf litter; for example, the wing-banded antbird forages in areas of dense leaf-litter. It does not use its feet to scratch the leaf litter, as do some other birds; instead it uses its long bill to turn over leaves rapidly (never picking them up). The antbirds that forage arboreally show a number of techniques and specialisations. Some species perch-glean, perching on a branch watching for prey and snatching it by reaching forward, where others sally from a perch and snatch prey on the wing. In both cases birds will hop through the foliage or undergrowth and pause, scanning for prey, before pouncing or moving on. The time paused varies, although smaller species tend to be more active and pause for shorter times.

==== Mixed-species feeding flocks ====
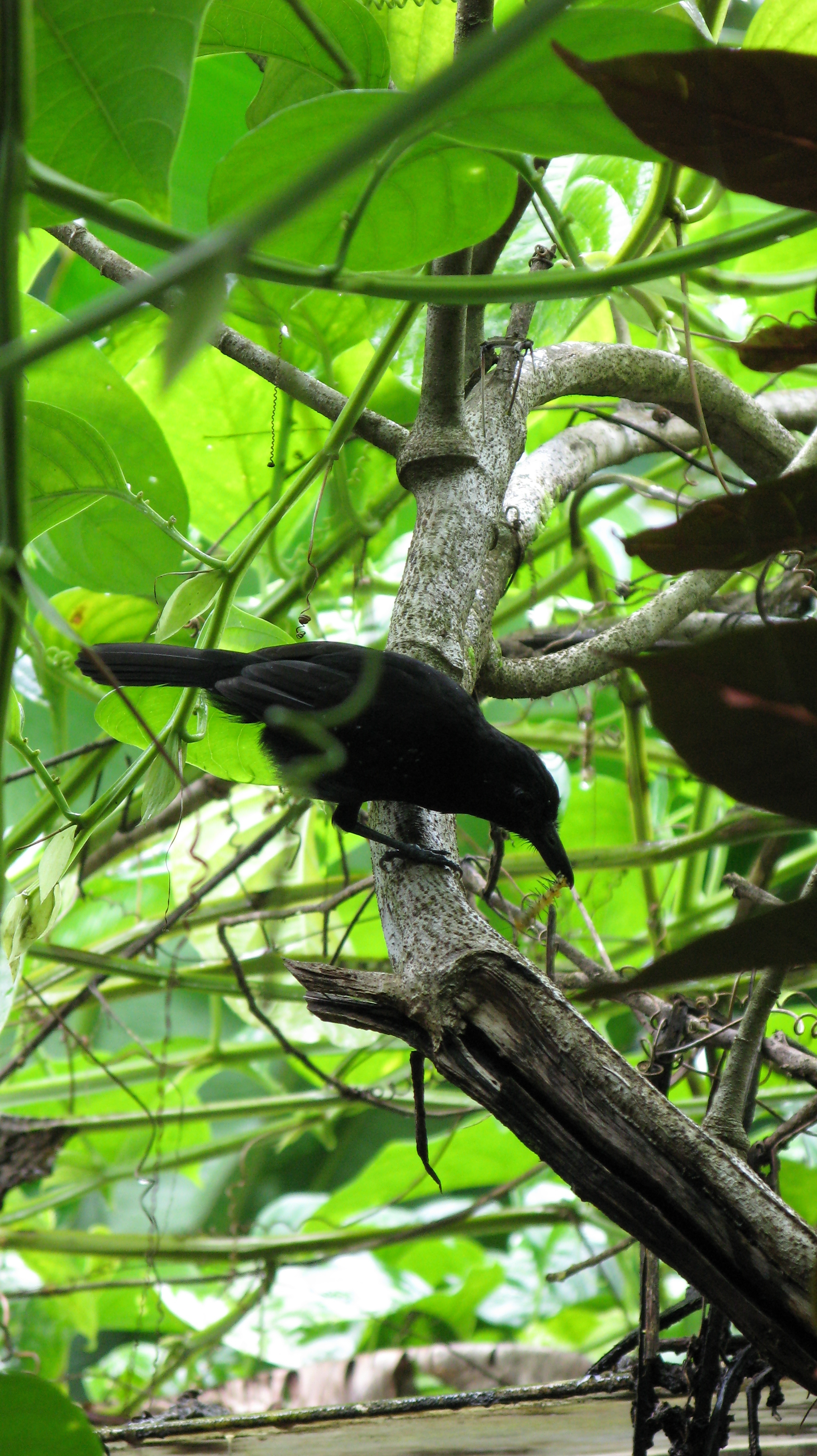
The black-hooded antshrike is a relatively sluggish species usually found singly or in pairs. Here a male feeds on a caterpillar.

Many species participate in mixed-species feeding flocks, forming a large percentage of the participating species within their range. Some of these are core or "nuclear species". These nuclear species share territories with other nuclear species but exclude conspecifics (members of the same species) and are found in almost all flocks; these are joined by "attendant species". Loud and distinctive calls and conspicuous plumage are important attributes of nuclear species as they promote cohesion in the flock. The composition of these flocks varies geographically; in Amazonia species of Thamnomanes antshrike are the leading nuclear species; elsewhere other species, such as the dot-winged antwrens and checker-throated stipplethroats, fill this role. Other species of antwren and antbird join them along with woodcreepers, ant-tanagers, foliage-gleaners and greenlets. The benefits of the mixed flock are thought to be related to predation, since many eyes are better for spotting predatory hawks and falcons. Comparisons between multi-species feeding flocks in different parts of the world found that instances of flocking were positively correlated with predation risk by raptors. For example, where Thamnomanes antshrikes lead the group they give loud warning calls in the presence of predators. These calls are understood and reacted to by all the other species in the flock. The advantage to the Thamnomanes antshrikes is in allowing the rest of the flock, which are typically gleaners, to act as beaters, flushing prey while foraging which the antshrikes can obtain by sallying. Similar roles are filled in other flocks by other antbird species or other bird families, for example the shrike-tanagers. Within the feeding flocks competition is reduced by microniche partitioning; where dot-winged antwrens, checker-throated stipplethroats and white-flanked antwrens feed in flocks together, the dot-wings feed in the densest vines, the white-flank in less dense vegetation, and the checker-throats in the same density as the latter but in dead foliage only.

==== Ant followers ====
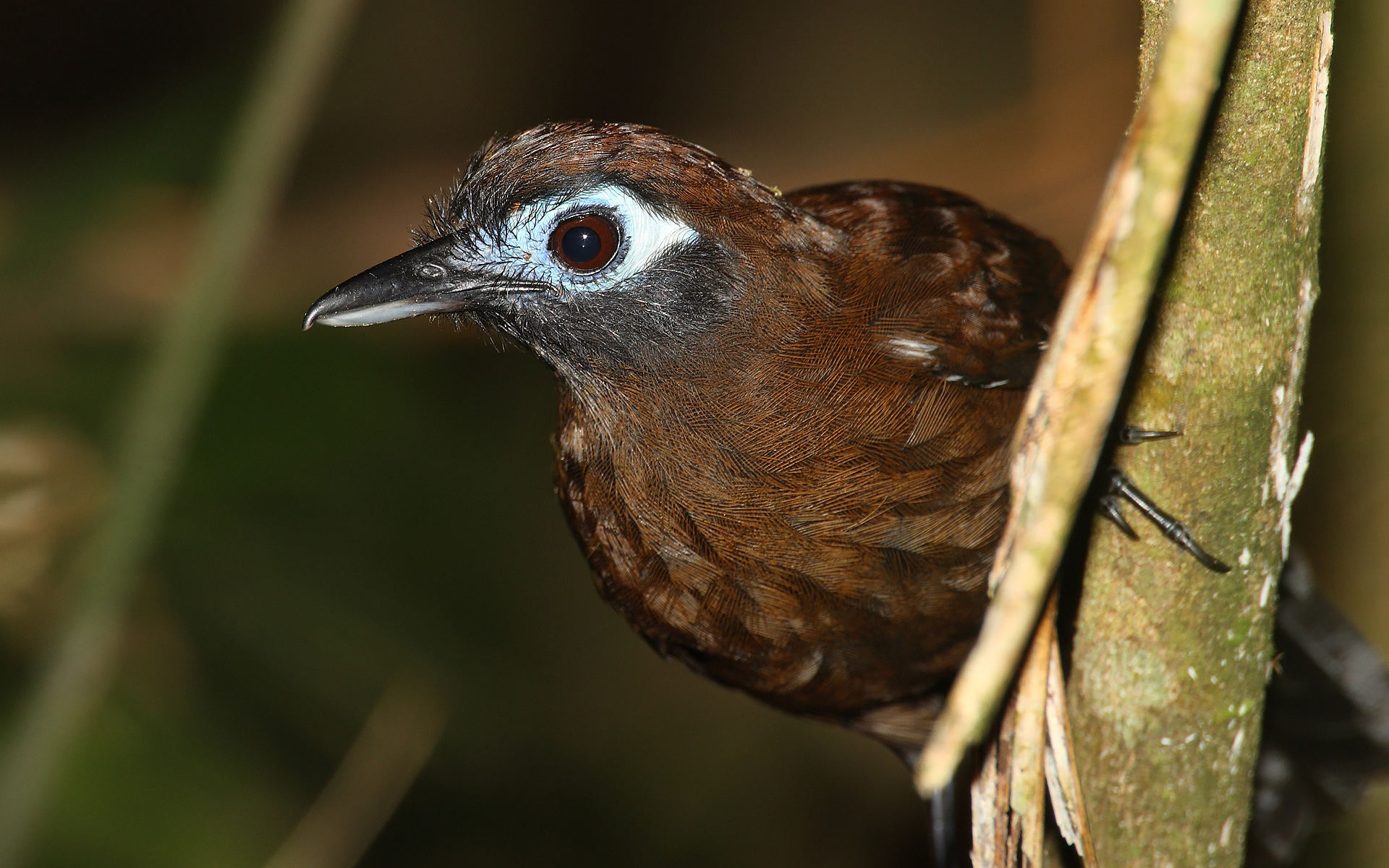
Immaculate antbirds regularly attend army ant swarms in order to feed, but they are not obligate ant-followers; they also forage away from the swarms.

Swarms of army ants are an important resource used by some species of antbird, and the one from which the family's common name is derived. Many species of tropical ant form large raiding swarms, but the swarms are often nocturnal or raid underground. While birds visit these swarms when they occur, the species most commonly attended by birds is the Neotropical species Eciton burchellii, which is both diurnal and surface-raiding. It was once thought that attending birds were actually eating the ants, but numerous studies in various parts of Eciton burchellii's range has shown that the ants act as beaters, flushing insects, other arthropods and small vertebrates into the waiting flocks of "ant followers". The improvement in foraging efficiency can be dramatic; a study of spotted antbirds found that they made attempts at prey every 111.8 seconds away from ants, but at swarms they made attempts every 32.3 seconds. While many species of antbirds (and other families) may opportunistically feed at army ant swarms, 18 species of antbird are obligate ant-followers, obtaining most of their diet from swarms. With only three exceptions, these species never regularly forage away from ant swarms. A further four species regularly attend swarms but are as often seen away from them. Obligate ant-followers visit the nesting bivouacs of army ants in the morning to check for raiding activities; other species do not. These species tend to arrive at swarms first, and their calls are used by other species to locate swarming ants.

Because army ants are unpredictable in their movements, it is impractical for obligate ant-followers to maintain a territory that always contains swarms to feed around. Antbirds have evolved a more complicated system than the strict territoriality of most other birds. They generally (details vary among species) maintain breeding territories but travel outside those territories in order to feed at swarms. Several pairs of the same species may attend a swarm, with the dominant pair at the swarm being the pair which holds the territory that the swarm is in. In addition to competition within species, competition among species exists, and larger species are dominant. In its range, the ocellated antbird is the largest of the obligate ant-following antbirds and is dominant over other members of the family, although it is subordinate to various species from other families (including certain woodcreepers, motmots and the rufous-vented ground cuckoo). At a swarm, the dominant species occupies positions above the central front of the swarm, which yields the largest amount of prey. Smaller, less dominant species locate themselves further away from the centre, or higher above the location of the dominant species, where prey is less plentiful.

=== Breeding ===
Antbirds are monogamous, in almost all cases forming pair bonds that last the life of the pair. Studies of the dusky antbird and the white-bellied antbird did not find "infidelity". In the white-plumed antbird, divorces between pairs are common, but, as far as known, this species is exceptional. In most species the pair defends a classic territory, although the nesting territories of ant followers are slightly different (see feeding above). Territories vary in size from as small as 0.5 ha for the Manu antbird, to 1500 m (5000 ft) in diameter for the ocellated antbird. Ocellated antbirds have an unusual social system where the breeding pair forms the nucleus of a group or clan that includes their male offspring and their mates. These clans, which can number up to eight birds, work together to defend territories against rivals. Pair bonds are formed with courtship feeding, where the male presents food items to the female. In spotted antbirds males may actually feed females sufficiently for the female to cease feeding herself, although she will resume feeding once copulation has occurred. Mutual grooming also plays a role in courtship in some species.

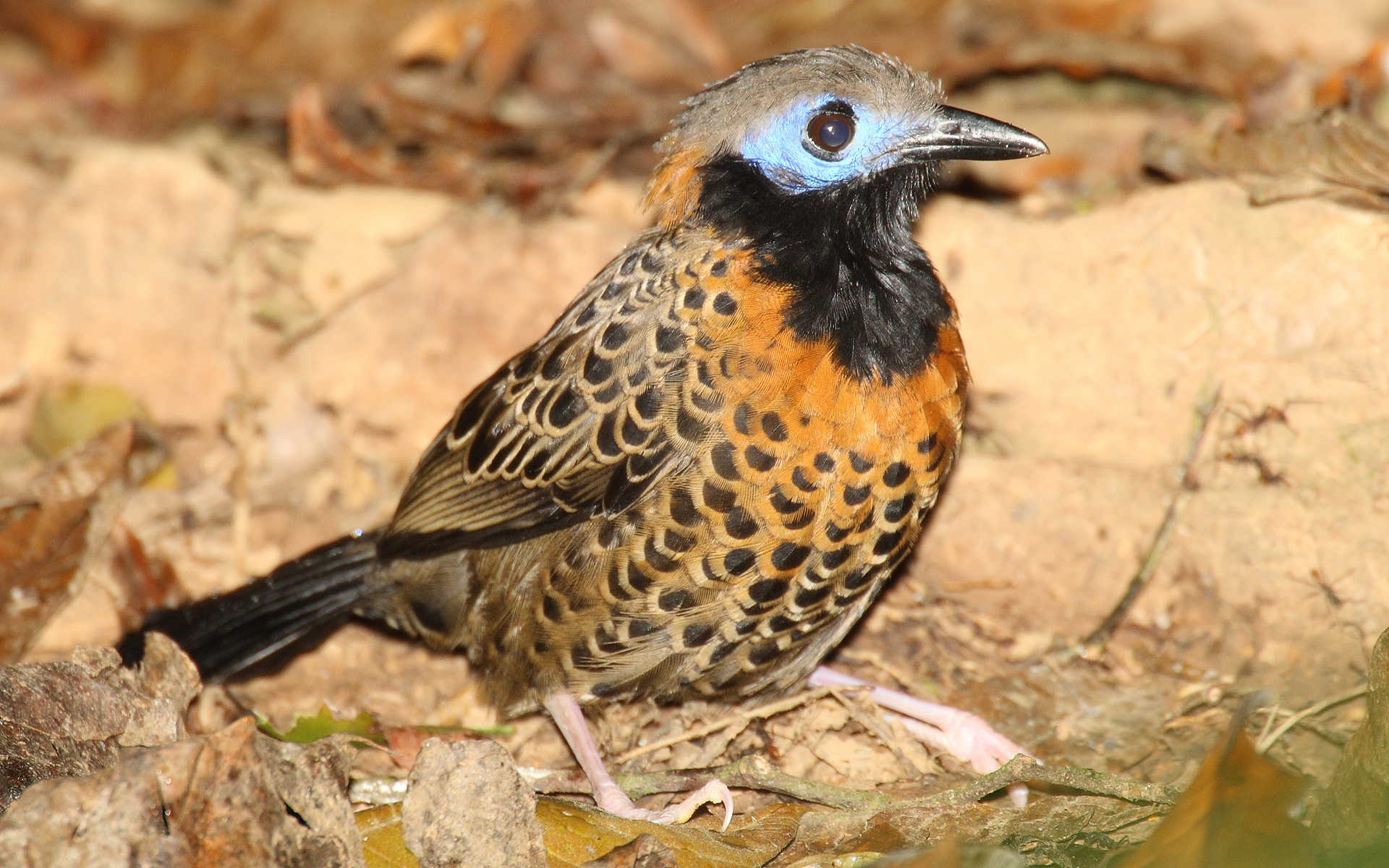
The ocellated antbird has an unusual social system of shared breeding territories. One dominant pair may share a territory with up to six other birds.

The nesting and breeding biology of antbirds have not been well studied. Even in relatively well-known species the breeding behaviour can be poorly known; for example the nest of the ocellated antbird was first described in 2004. Nests are constructed by both parents, although the male undertakes more of the work in some species. Antbird nests are cups of vegetation such as twigs, dead leaves and plant fibre, and they follow two basic patterns: either suspended or supported. Suspended cups, which may hang from forks in branches, or between two branches, are the more common style of nest. Supported nests rest upon branches, amongst vines, in hollows, and sometimes on mounds of vegetation on the ground. Each species nests at the level where it forages, so a midstory species would build its nest in the midstory. Closely related species nest in the same ways. For example, antvireos in the genus Dysithamnus are all suspension nesters.

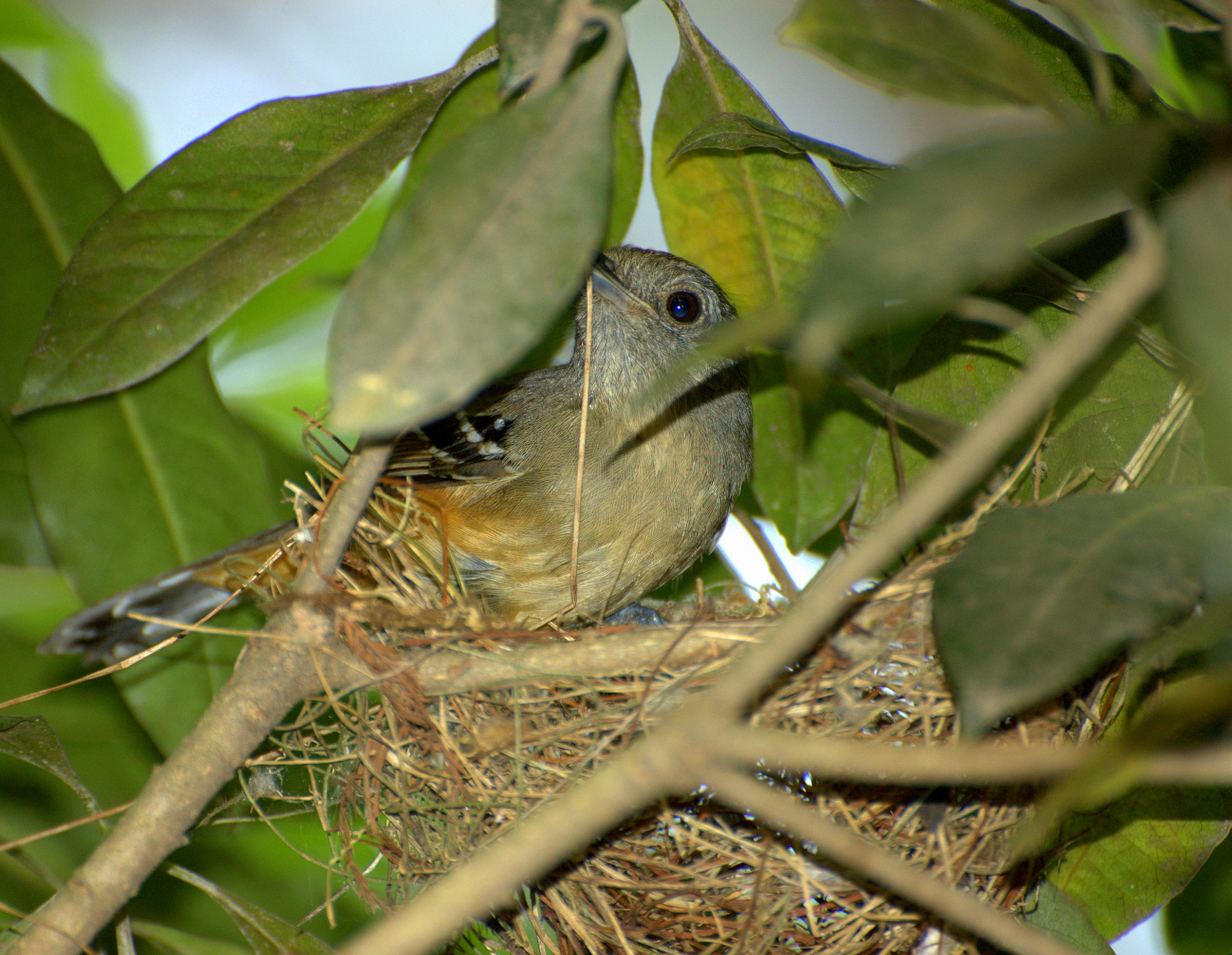
A female variable antshrike constructing a nest

Almost all antbirds lay two eggs. A few species of antshrike lay three eggs, and a smaller number of antbirds lay one egg, but this is unusual. Small clutch sizes are typical of tropical birds compared to more temperate species of the same size, possibly due to nest predation, although this is disputed. Both parents participate in incubation, although only the female incubates at night. The length of time taken for chicks to hatch is 14–16 days in most species, although some, such as the dusky antbird, can take as long as 20 days. The altricial chicks are born naked and blind. Both parents brood the young until they are able to thermoregulate, although, as with incubation, only the female broods at night. In common with many songbirds, the parents take faecal sacs for disposal away from the nest. Both parents feed the chicks, often bringing large prey items. When the chicks reach fledging age, after 8–15 days, attending parents call their chicks. As each chick leaves the nest it is cared for exclusively from then on by the parent that was present then. After the first chick fledges and leaves with a parent the remaining parent may increase the supply of food to speed up the process of fledging. After fledging, chicks spend the first few days well hidden as the parents bring them food. Chicks of some species may not become independent of the parents for as long as four months in some antwrens, but two months is more typical for the rest of the family.

== Ecology ==
Antbirds are common components of the avifauna of some parts of the Neotropics and are thought to be important in some ecological processes. They are preyed upon by birds of prey, and their tendency to join flocks is thought to provide protection against such predation. The greater round-eared bat preys on some antbird species, such as the white-bibbed antbird and the scaled antbird; the latter is the bat's preferred prey. Nests, including incubating adults, chicks and eggs, are vulnerable to predators, particularly snakes but also nocturnal mammals. Nesting success is low for many species, particularly in areas of fragmented habitat.

It was once suggested that the relationship between the obligate and regular ant-followers and the army ants, particularly Eciton burchellii, was mutualistic, with the ants benefiting by having the birds chase prey back down towards them. However, experiments where ant followers were excluded have shown that the foraging success of the army ants was 30% lower when the birds were present, suggesting that the birds' relationship was in fact parasitic. This has resulted in behaviour by the ants in order to reduce kleptoparasitism, including hiding of secured prey in the leaf litter and caching of food on trails. It has been suggested that the depressive effect of this parasitism slows the development of E. burchellii swarms and in turn benefits other ant species which are preyed upon by army ants. The ant-following antbirds are themselves followed by three species of butterfly in the family Ithomiinae which feed on their droppings. Bird droppings are usually an unpredictable resource in a rainforest, but the regular behaviour of ant followers makes the exploitation of this resource possible.

== Status and conservation ==
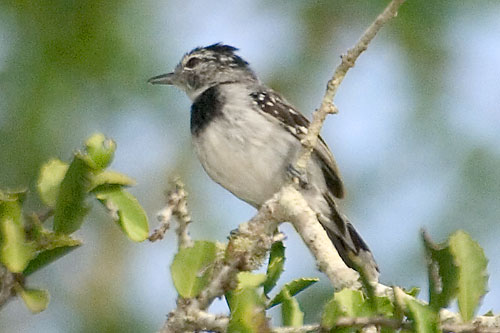
The pectoral antwren of Brazil is threatened by the loss of deciduous forest and is listed as vulnerable by the IUCN.

As of April 2008, 38 species are considered by the IUCN to be near threatened or worse and therefore at risk of extinction. Antbirds are neither targeted by the pet trade nor large enough to be hunted; the principal cause of the decline in antbird species is habitat loss. The destruction or modification of forests has several effects on different species of antbirds. The fragmentation of forests into smaller patches affects species that are averse to crossing gaps as small as roads. If these species become locally extinct in a fragment, this reluctance to cross unforested barriers makes their re-establishment unlikely. Smaller forest fragments are unable to sustain mixed-species feeding flocks, leading to local extinctions. Another risk faced by antbirds in fragmented habitat is increased nest predation. An unplanned experiment in fragmentation occurred on Barro Colorado Island, a former hill in Panama that became an isolated island during the flooding caused by the creation of the Panama Canal. Numerous species of antbird formerly resident in the area were extirpated, in no small part due to increased levels of nest predation on the island. While the species lost from Barro Colorado are not globally threatened, they illustrate the vulnerability of species in fragmented habitats and help explain the declines of some species. The majority of threatened species have very small natural ranges. Some are also extremely poorly known; for example the Rio de Janeiro antwren is known only from a single specimen collected in 1982, although there have been unconfirmed reports since 1994 and it is currently listed as critically endangered. Additionally, new species are discovered at regular intervals; the Caatinga antwren was described in 2000, the acre antshrike in 2004, the sincorá antwren in 2007, and the description of a relative of the Paraná antwren discovered in 2005 in the outskirts of São Paulo is being prepared. While not yet scientifically described, conservation efforts have already been necessary, as the site of discovery was set out to be flooded to form a reservoir. Consequently, 72 individuals were captured and transferred to another locality.

== See also ==
- List of antbird genera
- List of antbird species
