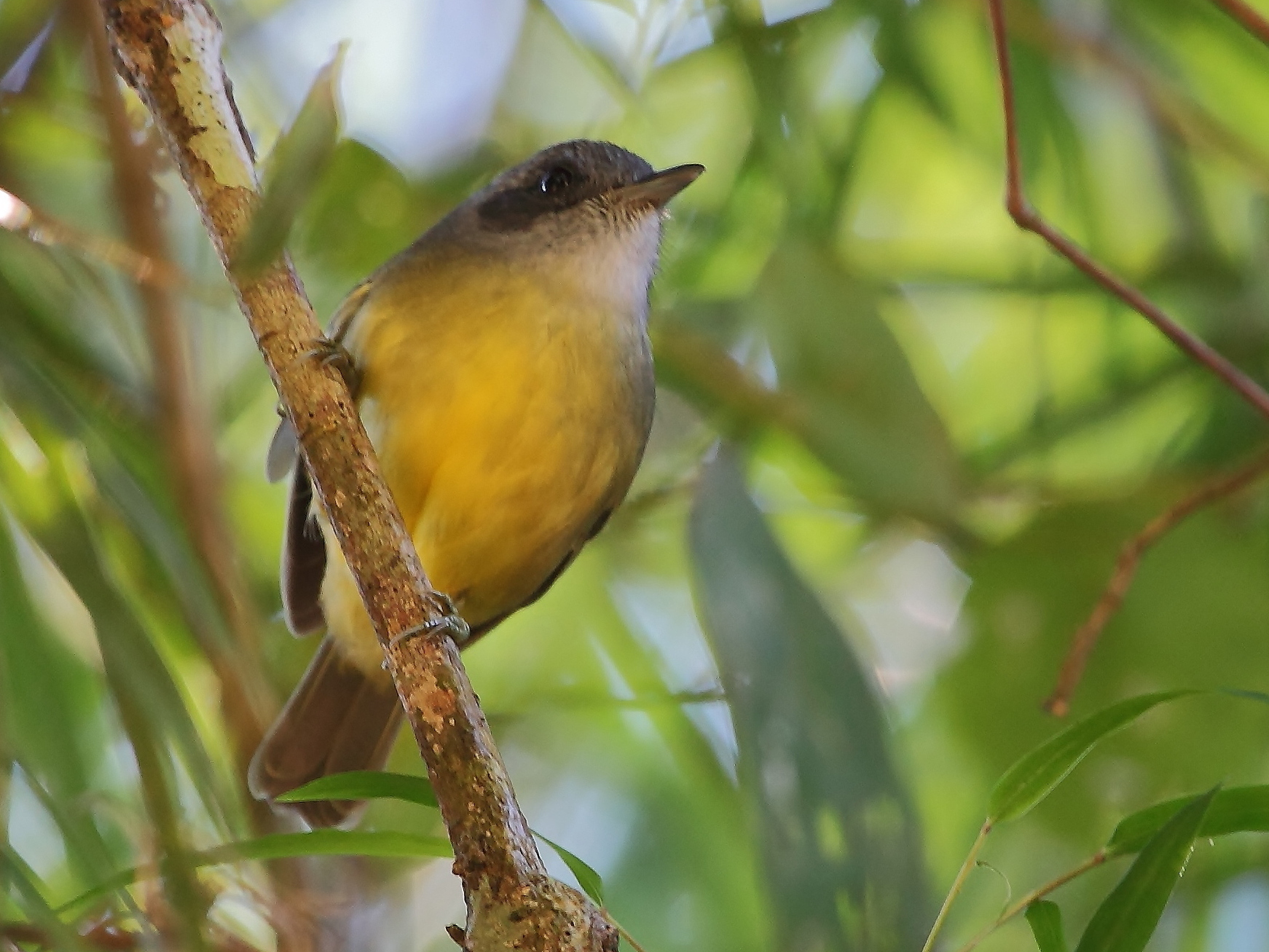
- Male at Jacutinga, Minas Gerais State, Brazil
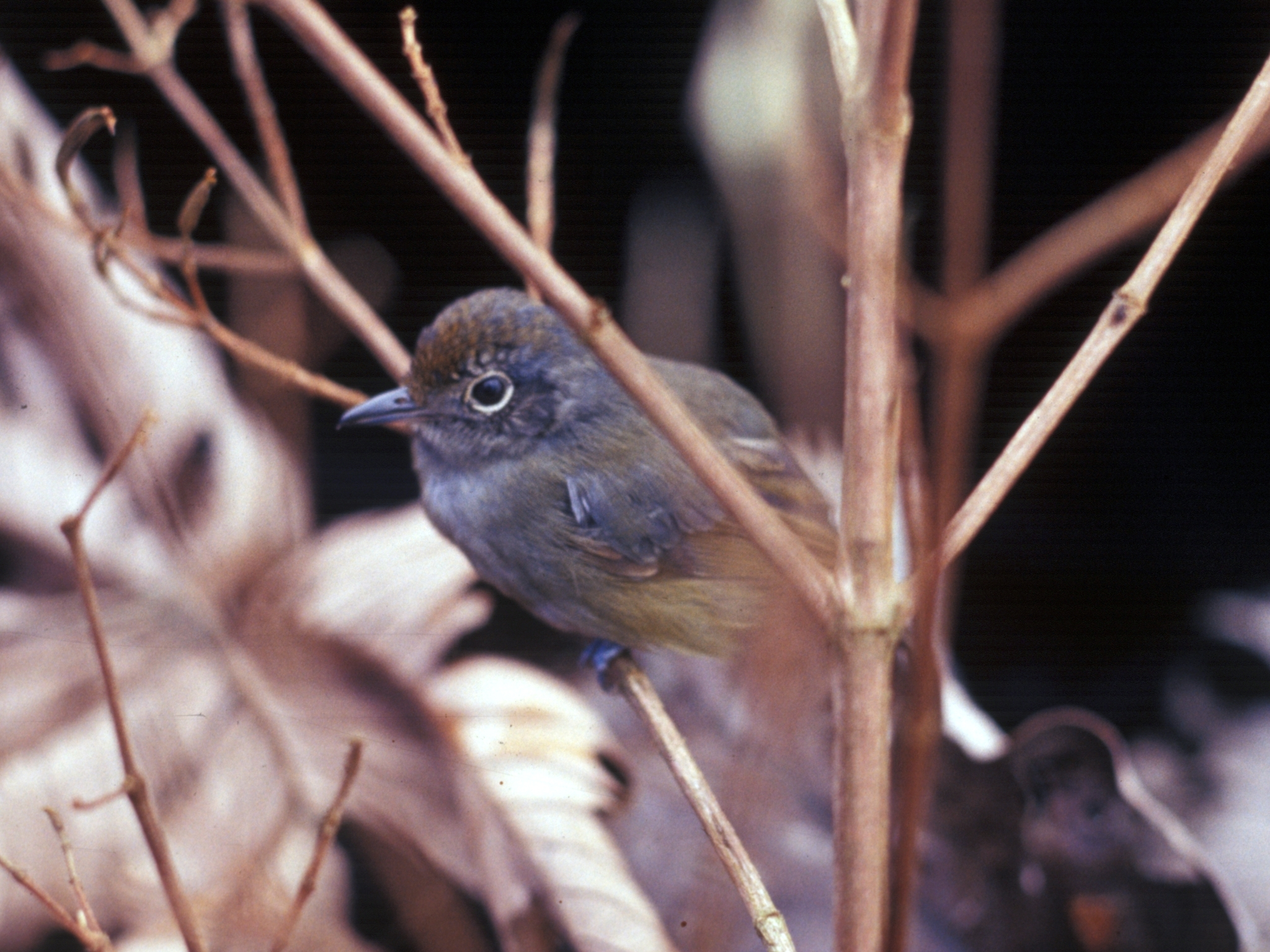
- Female at Cordillera del Cóndor, Ecuador

Conservation status
- Least Concern (IUCN 3.1)

Scientific classification
- Kingdom: Animalia
- Phylum: Chordata
- Class: Aves
- Order: Passeriformes
- Family: Thamnophilidae
- Genus: Dysithamnus
- Species: D. mentalis

Binomial name
- Dysithamnus mentalis (Temminck, 1823)

= Plain antvireo =

Species of bird

The plain antvireo (Dysithamnus mentalis) is a passerine bird species in subfamily Thamnophilinae of family Thamnophilidae, the "typical antbirds". It is found in Mexico, every Central American country except El Salvador, on both Trinidad and Tobago, and in every mainland South American country except Chile, French Guiana, Suriname, and Uruguay.

== Taxonomy and systematics ==
The plain antvireo was described by the Dutch zoologist Coenraad Jacob Temminck in 1823 and given the binomial name Myothera mentalis. It is now placed in the genus Dysithamnus which was introduced by the German ornithologist Jean Cabanis in 1847.

The plain antvireo has these 18 subspecies:

- D. m. septentrionalis Ridgway, 1908
- D. m. suffusus Nelson, 1912
- D. m. extremus Todd, 1916
- D. m. semicinereus Sclater, PL, 1855
- D. m. viridis Aveledo & Pons, 1952
- D. m. cumbreanus Hellmayr & Seilern, 1915
- D. m. andrei Hellmayr, 1906
- D. m. oberi Ridgway, 1908
- D. m. ptaritepui Zimmer, JT & Phelps, 1946
- D. m. spodionotus Salvin & Godman, 1883
- D. m. aequatorialis Todd, 1916
- D. m. napensis Chapman, 1925
- D. m. tambillanus Taczanowski, 1884
- D. m. olivaceus (Tschudi, 1844)
- D. m. tavarae Zimmer, JT, 1932
- D. m. emiliae Hellmayr, 1912
- D. m. affinis Pelzeln, 1868
- D. m. mentalis (Temminck, 1823)

== Description ==
The plain antvireo is 10 to 13 cm (3.9 to 5.1 in) long and weighs 12 to 16 g (0.42 to 0.56 oz). It is a rather chunky bird with a large head and short tail. Adult males of the nominate subspecies D. m. mentalis have a dark gray forehead and crown and blackish ear coverts. Their upperparts are grayish olive with a hidden white patch between the scapulars. Their wings are dark grayish olive with olive edges on the flight feathers, white tips on the grayish olive greater coverts, blackish median coverts with white tips, and blackish lesser coverts. Their tail is dark grayish olive with narrow white tips on the feathers. Their throat and upper breast are white with light gray spots and their sides olive gray. Their lower breast, flanks, and crissum are pale gray and the center of their belly yellow. Adult females have a cinnamon-tawny crown. Their upperparts and wings are more olive and less gray than the male's and they lack the white interscapular patch. Their wing coverts and the edges of their flight feathers are olive-yellow. Their underparts have more extensive yellow than do males'.

The other subspecies of the plain antvireo differ from the nominate and each other thus:

- D. m. viridis: like the nominate
- D. m. cumbreanus: like the nominate
- D. m. emiliae: like the nominate
- D. m. septentrionalis: male grayer than nominate with yellowish belly; female overall browner
- D. m. suffusus: male slightly paler than septentrionalis
- D. m. affinis: male somewhat paler than suffusus, with a white belly center; female has warm brown upperparts
- D. m. andrei: male slightly darker than affinis; female duller brown than affinis
- D. m. oberi: male like andrei; female with yellower underparts
- D. m. extremus: male has blackish crown, otherwise like the nominate
- D. m. semicinereus: male has almost pure gray upperparts with a hint of olive, a grayer tail than nominate, and gray throat and underparts with white belly center and faint yellow tinge on lower belly and flanks; female has a more tawny crown and even less gray tone on the upperparts than nominate, clay colored edges to flight and tail feathers, olive-brown tinge to throat, light olive-brown breastband, white upper belly becoming yellowish olive on lower belly, and olive sides and flanks
- D. m. spodionotus: male darker than semicinereus; female warm ochraceous with white throat and belly
- D. m. ptaritepui: similar to spodionotus but male not as dark
- D. m. tavarae: similar to spodionotus but male not as dark
- D. m. olivaceus: male slightly more olive than ptaritepui and tavarae
- D. m. napensis: male paler than olivaceous with less yellow than nominate; female underparts drab buffy-olive with no yellow
- D. m. tambillanus: like napensis
- D. m. aequatorialis: male's underparts much paler than those of napensis and tambillanus with pale yellow belly and gray tinge on the flanks

There is some question about the validity of all the subspecies, with some possibly representing clinal variation rather than subspeciation. "[M]olecular studies [are] needed in order to establish relationships among populations."

== Distribution and habitat ==
The plain antvireo has an oddly shaped and disjunct distribution. The subspecies are found thus:

- D. m. septentrionalis: from Campeche, Tabasco, and Chiapas in southeastern Mexico south on the Caribbean slope through Belize, Guatemala, Honduras, and locally in Nicaragua; Caribbean and Pacific slopes of Costa Rica and Panama to the Panama Canal
- D. m. suffusus: Caribbean and Pacific slopes of Panama from the Canal into Chocó and Antioquia departments in extreme northwestern Colombia
- D. m. extremus: Colombia's Western Andes and west slope of Central Andes between Antioquia and Cauca Department
- D. m. semicinereus: east slope of Colombia's Central Andes and both slopes of the Eastern Andes between Santander and Caquetá departments
- D. m. viridis: northern Colombia from La Guajira Department south to Santander Department and in northwestern Venezuela's Sierra de Perijá and the western Andes of Zulia, Mérida, and Táchira states
- D. m. cumbreanus: northern Venezuela's Coastal Ranges from Falcón and Lara east to northern Sucre
- D. m. andrei: northeastern Venezuela from Sucre to Bolívar, western and southern Guyana, and Trinidad (and see below)
- D. m. oberi: Tobago
- D. m. ptaritepui: tepuis of southeastern Venezuela's Bolívar state
- D. m. spodionotus: from Bolívar and Amazonas states in southern Venezuela into northern Roraima in extreme northern Brazil
- D. m. aequatorialis: Pacific slope from Ecuador's Esmeraldas Province south into the Department of Tumbes in extreme northwestern Peru
- D. m. napensis: eastern slope of the Andes from extreme southern Colombia south through eastern Ecuador into extreme northern Peru's Amazonas Department
- D. m. tambillanus: eastern slope of the Andes in northern and central Peru south to Huánuco and Ucayali departments
- D. m. olivaceus: eastern slope of the Peruvian Andes between Pasco and Madre de Dios departments
- D. m. tavarae: Andes from Madre de Dios in southeastern Peru south into central Bolivia as far as southwestern Santa Cruz Department
- D. m. emiliae: northeastern Brazil roughly bounded by northeastern Pará, Paraíba, northern Tocantins, and Alagoas
- D. m. affinis: northeastern Santa Cruz in extreme northeastern Bolivia and central Brazil roughly bounded by southern Mato Grosso, southern Tocantins, northern Goiás, and northern Mato Grosso do Sul
- D. m. mentalis: east-central and southeastern Brazil from eastern Bahia south through Rio Grande do Sul and into Easter Paraguay and northeastern Argentina's Misiones Province

Subspecies D. m. andrei is known in Guyana in the Pakaraima Mountains (though not Mount Roraima) and the southern Acari Mountains; as of 2007 it had not been recorded in the Iwokrama Forest or the Potaro Plateau.

The plain antvireo inhabits a variety of landscapes across its wide range. In Mexico and Central America it occurs in the understorey to mid-storey of humid montane evergreen forest and mature secondary forest. In the northern part of this area it ranges in elevation from sea level to 1,500 m (4,900 ft) though mostly below 1,250 m (4,100 ft), while in Costa Rica it reaches 2,500 m (8,200 ft) though only rarely. In the northern mountains and tepuis of Venezuela and in the Andes from Venezuela and Colombia to Bolivia it occurs in humid evergreen forest and also in semi-deciduous and deciduous forest and woodlands. In Colombia it ranges between 300 and 2,400 m (1,000 and 7,900 ft). In Ecuador west of the Andes it occurs from sea level to 1,500 m (4,900 ft) and east of the Andes between 700 and 1,700 m (2,300 and 5,600 ft). In Peru it occurs between 400 and 2,100 m (1,300 and 6,900 ft) and in Bolivia as high as 2,500 m (8,200 ft). In northeastern Brazil subspecies emiliae inhabits dry forest in savanna and also in wetter terra firme and várzea forests. The nominate subspecies mentalis is mostly found in humid Atlantic Forest. Elsewhere in the east and south (i.e. eastern Venezuela, Guyana, inland Brazil, Paraguay, and Argentina) it occurs in dry savanna forest, mature secondary forest, gallery forest, and semi-deciduous forest as high as 2,500 m (8,200 ft).

== Behavior ==
=== Movement ===
The plain antvireo is thought to be a year-round resident throughout its range.

=== Feeding ===
The plain antvireo feeds mostly on insects; its diet also includes other arthropods like spiders and occasionally Rapanea mistletoe berries. It usually forages singly or in pairs, and often joins a mixed-species feeding flock though almost as often forages away from them. It typically feeds from near the ground to about 4 or 5 m (13 or 16 ft) above it, occasionally higher and very rarely up to the forest subcanopy. It forages rather sluggishly, gleaning from a perch, and taking most of its prey from foliage though often from vines and sometimes thin branches and dead leaves. It sometimes sallies from a perch to hover-glean, and sometimes forages on the ground. It occasionally attends army ant swarms for a short period.

=== Breeding ===
The plain antvireo's nesting season varies geographically. It spans from February to July in Costa Rica, April to July in Trinidad, and includes November in southeastern Brazil and northern Argentina. Its season has not been detailed elsewhere. Its nest is a cup of fibers from roots, fungus, and green plants and often is covered with green moss; strands of moss often dangle below the cup. It is typically suspended from a branch fork in a shrub or small tree between about 0.6 and 2.5 m (2 and 8 ft) above the ground. The clutch size is two eggs; both parents incubate during the day and usually only the female at night. The incubation period is about 15 days and (in Costa Rica) fledging occurs nine to 10 days after hatch.

Breeding pairs are quite territorial against conspecifics, and in the Atlantic Forest defend a patch of habitat that may be as large as about 7,000 m^{2} (8,400 sq yd), but sometimes is only half that size.

=== Vocalization ===
The plain antvireo's song is generally a "short...series starting with a few...evenly paced, countable notes at same pitch, notes then gradually becoming more abrupt and dropping in pitch, ending in accelerating roll". Authors have described it as a "high nasal watje watjwatwaturururu sounding as a rattle" and as "a nasal barking series...weu-weu-weu-Weu-Weu-Weu-Weu-Weu'weu'wru'weu'u'u'u". Its calls include a "nasal, musical note" and a "short...rapid series of gradually rising notes".

== Status ==
The IUCN has assessed the plain antvireo as being of Least Concern. It has an extremely large range and an estimated population of at least 500,000 mature individuals. The latter is believed to be decreasing. No immediate threats have been identified. It is considered generally fairly common, though uncommon in northern Central America, uncommon in the Costa Rican lowlands, and common in Colombia and western Ecuador. It occurs in several protected areas though "continuing deforestation could ultimately threaten some races". In southeastern Brazil it "appears to be adversely affected by selective logging".
