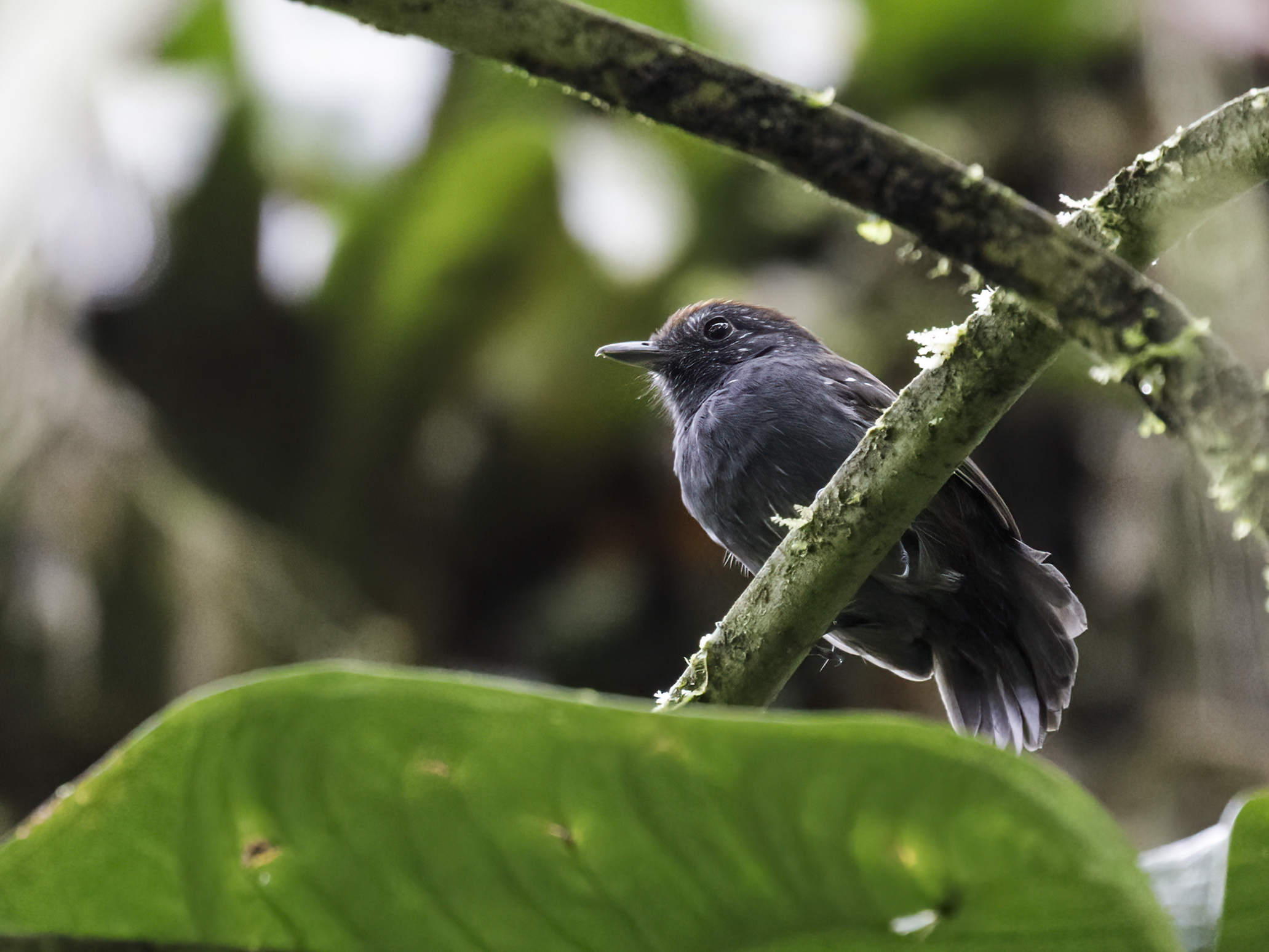

Conservation status
- Near Threatened (IUCN 3.1)

Scientific classification
- Kingdom: Animalia
- Phylum: Chordata
- Class: Aves
- Order: Passeriformes
- Family: Thamnophilidae
- Genus: Dysithamnus
- Species: D. occidentalis

Binomial name
- Dysithamnus occidentalis (Chapman, 1923)

Synonyms
- Thamnophilus aethiops occidentalis Chapman, 1923

= Bicolored antvireo =

Species of bird

The bicolored antvireo (Dysithamnus occidentalis) is a Near Threatened insectivorous bird in subfamily Thamnophilinae of family Thamnophilidae, the "typical antbirds". It is found in Colombia, Ecuador, and Peru.

== Taxonomy and systematics ==
The bicolored antvireo was described by the American ornithologist Frank Chapman in 1923. He considered it a subspecies of the white-shouldered antshrike (Thamnophilus aethiops) and coined the trinomial name Thamnophilus aethiops occidentalis. By the end of the twentieth century, it was widely accepted as a member of its present genus Dysithamnus .

The bicolored antvireo has two subspecies, the nominate D. o. occidentalis (Chapman, 1923) and D. o. punctitectus (Chapman, 1924). Confusingly, punctitectus was originally described as a species in genus Dysithamnus while occidentalis was still in genus Thamnophilus. When occidentalis was moved to Dysithamnus and punctitectus was assigned as a subspecies, because occidentalis had been described first (even in a different genus) it became the nominate because of the principle of priority.

== Description ==
The bicolored antvireo is about 13 to 13.5 cm (5.1 to 5.3 in) long. Adult males of the nominate subspecies D. o. occidentalis have a blackish gray head, upperparts, and tail with a mostly-hidden white patch between the scapulars. Their wings are black with white dots on the greater and median coverts and mostly white lesser coverts which are mostly hidden. Their underparts are a slightly lighter blackish gray than the upperparts. Adult females have a chestnut crown and upperparts with buffy white spots on the wing coverts. Their face, throat, and breast are dark grey with thin white streaks; their belly and crissum are olive-brown. Both sexes of subspecies D. o. punctitectus are paler than the nominate and their lesser wing coverts are completely white.

== Distribution and habitat ==
The bicolored antvireo has a disjunct distribution. The nominate subspecies is the more northerly of the two. It is found on the Pacific slope of the Andes from southern Antioquia Department in Colombia south into Carchi Province in extreme northern Ecuador. Subspecies D. o. punctitectus is found on the Andes' eastern slope separately in Ecuador's Napo and Morona-Santiago provinces and Peru's Amazonas and San Martín departments. The species inhabits the understorey of humid montane evergreen forest. In most areas it seems to favor natural openings such as those created by treefall and landslide. In elevation it ranges between 1,600 and 2,400 m (5,200 and 7,900 ft) in Colombia and between 2,000 and 2,500 m (6,600 and 8,200 ft) in Peru. In northern Ecuador it occurs at about 2,200 m (7,200 ft) and on the east Andean slope between 1,500 and 2,050 m (4,900 and 6,700 ft).

== Behavior ==
=== Movement ===
The bicolored antvireo is thought to be a year-round resident throughout its range.

=== Feeding ===
The bicolored antvireo's diet is not known in detail but is mostly insects and other arthropods. It usually forages singly or in pairs, and never as part of a mixed-species feeding flock. It typically feeds within 2 m (5 ft) of the ground. It feeds mostly by reaching or lunging from a perch to glean from leaves and twigs and also often sallies from a perch to glean.

=== Breeding ===
One bicolored antvireo nest has been recorded, in Ecuador in December. It was an open cup made of fungal fibers and twigs in a branch fork and partially hidden by overhanging leaves. It held one nestling that both parents were feeding. Nothing else is known about the species' breeding biology.

=== Vocalization ===
The bicolored antvireo's song has not been identified with certainty; one of the vocalizations thought to be a call might be the song. In Ecuador the species' most common call is a "fast throaty scold, 'jeér-deer-dur' ". In that country it also makes "clear 'peeu' calls" and "a fast ascending 'pu-pu-pooyeh?' ". Schulenberg et al. describe a vocalization in San Martín, Peru, as a song, "an accelerating, descending series of clear rising whistles: WEE wee-wee-wee-whe'he'huhu". Calls in Peru are described as "a deep chattered growl: prr'r'r'r" and "a rising series of mewing or whining notes: dew dew dwi-dwee-dwee?.

== Status ==
The IUCN originally in 1994 assessed the bicolored antvireo as Vulnerable and in 2022 downlisted it to Near Threatened. It occupies a limited number of sites within its disjunct range, and its estimated population of between 7300 and 8000 mature individuals is believed to be decreasing. "The species has suffered substantial habitat loss to agriculture, especially in Ecuador where much suitable habitat has been cleared, except on the Cordillera de Guacamayos and Volcán Sumaco where large tracts of pristine forests are still present." It occurs in some nominally protected areas in Colombia but all are either surrounded by cleared land or being encroached upon by human settlement. The species is considered uncommon and local in Colombia and rare, local, and poorly known in both Ecuador and Peru.
