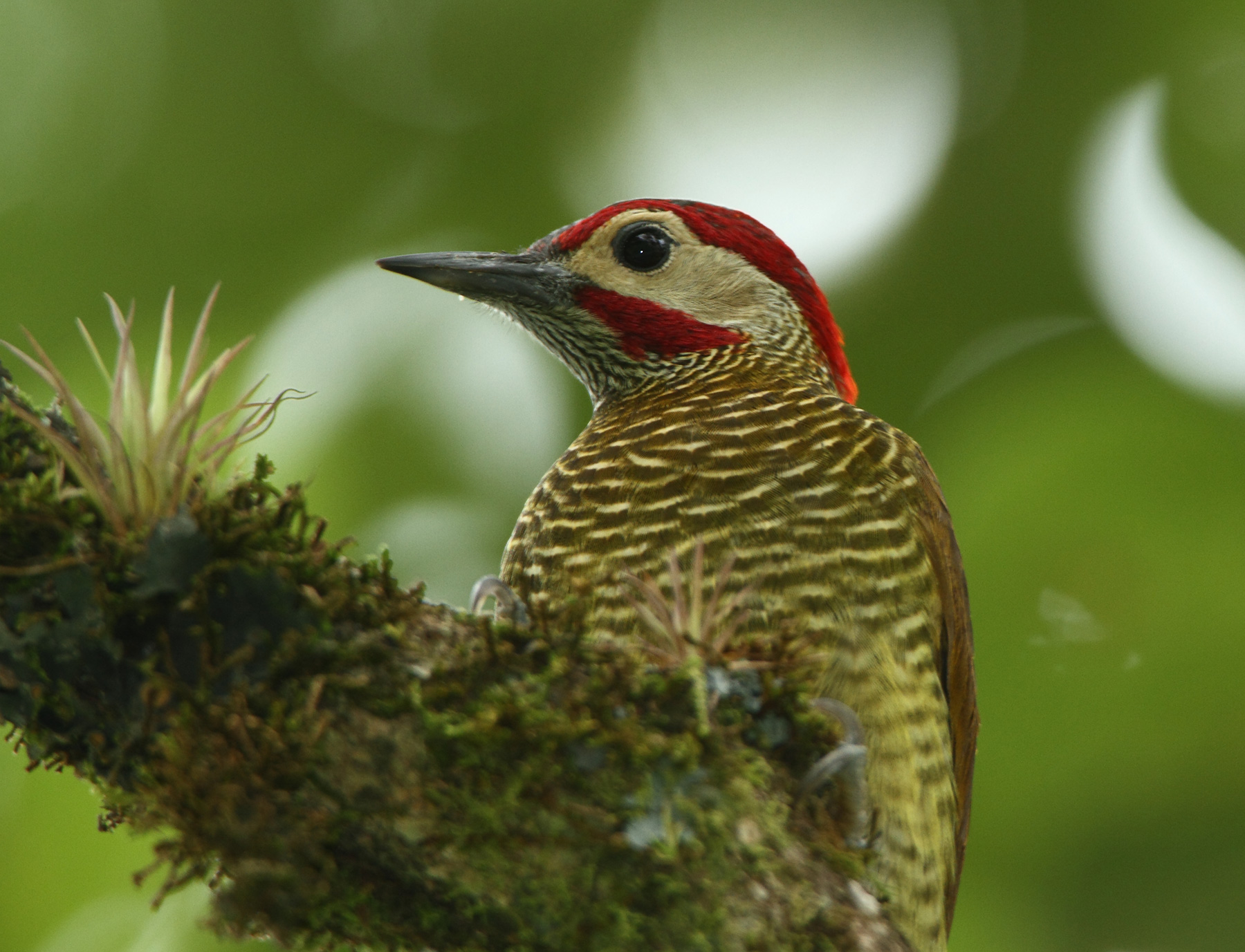

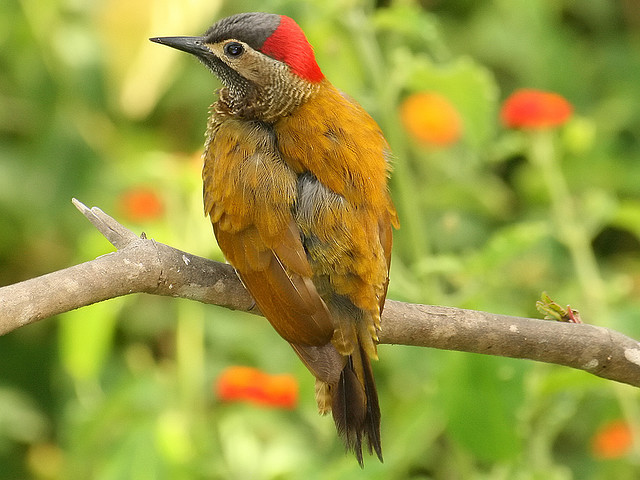
- Male above, female below

Conservation status
- Least Concern (IUCN 3.1)

Scientific classification
- Kingdom: Animalia
- Phylum: Chordata
- Class: Aves
- Order: Piciformes
- Family: Picidae
- Genus: Colaptes
- Species: C. rubiginosus

Binomial name
- Colaptes rubiginosus (Swainson, 1820)

Synonyms
- Piculus rubiginosus Swainson, 1820; Piculus aeruginosus (Malherbe, 1862)

= Golden-olive woodpecker =

Species of bird

The golden-olive woodpecker (Colaptes rubiginosus) is a species of bird in the subfamily Picinae of the woodpecker family Picidae. It is found from Mexico south and east through Panama, in every mainland South American country except Chile, Paraguay, and Uruguay.

== Taxonomy ==
The golden-olive woodpecker was formally described in 1820 as Picus rubiginosis by the English zoologist William Swainson. The specific epithet is Latin meaning "rusty". Swainson specified the type locality as the "Spanish Main". In 1918 the Austrian ornithologist Carl Eduard Hellmayr restricted the location to Caracas, Venezuela. The golden-olive woodpecker is now one of 14 species placed in the genus Colaptes that was introduced in 1825 by the Irish zoologist Nicholas Aylward Vigors.

Nineteen subspecies are recognised:

- C. r. yucatanensis (Cabot, S Jr, 1844) – southern Mexico (Oaxaca) to western Panama
- C. r. alleni (Bangs, O, 1902) – Santa Marta Mountains (northeastern Colombia)
- C. r. buenavistae (Chapman, FM, 1915) – Andean slopes of eastern Colombia and eastern Ecuador
- C. r. meridensis (Ridgway, R, 1911) – northwestern Venezuela
- C. r. rubiginosus (Swainson, WJ, 1820) – mountains of north-central and northeastern Venezuela
- C. r. deltanus (Aveledo H, R & Ginés, H, 1953) – northeastern Venezuela (Delta Amacuro)
- C. r. paraquensis (Phelps, WH Sr & Phelps, WH Jr, 1948) – mountains of south-central Venezuela
- C. r. guianae (Hellmayr, CE, 1918) – eastern Venezuela and adjacent Guyana
- C. r. viridissimus (Chapman, FM, 1939) – tepuis of southern Venezuela (high plateau of Auyán-tepui)
- C. r. nigriceps (Blake, ER, 1941) – Acari Mountains (southern Guyana and adjacent southern Suriname)
- C. r. trinitatis (Ridgway, R, 1911) – Trinidad
- C. r. tobagensis (Ridgway, R, 1911) – Tobago
- C. r. gularis (Hargitt, E, 1889) – Colombia (central and western Andes)
- C. r. rubripileus (Salvadori, AT & Festa, E, 1900) – far southwestern Colombia to western Ecuador and northwestern Peru
- C. r. coloratus (Chapman, FM, 1923) – far southeastern Ecuador and north-central Peru
- C. r. chrysogaster (Berlepsch, HHCL & Sztolcman, JS, 1902) – central Peru
- C. r. canipileus (d'Orbigny, ACVMD, 1840) – central and southeastern Bolivia
- C. r. tucumanus (Cabanis, JL, 1883) – southern Bolivia to northwestern Argentina (south to Tucumán)
- C. r. aeruginosus (Malherbe, A, 1862) – eastern Mexico (Tamaulipas to Veracruz)

The subspecies C. r. aeruginosus has sometimes been considered as a separate species, the bronze-winged woodpecker. Its relationships are uncertain as it has not been included in a genetic study.

Further splittings of these subspecies have been proposed at various times but each is currently (2023) considered synonymous with a member of this list.

According to some authors, the golden-olive woodpecker sensu lato and the grey-crowned woodpecker (C. auricularis) form a superspecies. However, research since 2010 has found that the golden-olive C. rubiginosus is not monophyletic, with some subspecies being more closely related to the grey-crowned woodpecker and others to the black-necked woodpecker (C. atricollis) than they are to other golden-olive subspecies.

== Description ==
The golden-olive woodpecker is 18 to 23 cm (7.1 to 9.1 in) long. Males and females have the same plumage except on their heads. Adult males of the nominate subspecies C. r. rubiginosus have a slate gray forehead and crown with a red border and nape. They are pale buff to whitish from their lores around the eye to the red of the nape. They have a wide red malar stripe and a pale buffy white chin and upper throat; the last has heavy blackish streaks. Adult females have red only on their nape, and their malar area has streaks like the throat. Both sexes have mostly green upperparts with a bronze tinge; their rump and uppertail coverts are paler and barred with dark olive. Their flight feathers are dark brownish olive with greenish edges and some yellowish on the shafts. Their tail is brown. Their underparts are pale buffy yellow with blackish olive bars; the bars are closest together on the chest. Their medium-length bill is slaty gray to black, their iris deep dull red, and their legs gray to olive-gray. Juveniles are generally duller than adults and have less well-defined barring on their underparts.

The other subspecies of golden-olive woodpeckers differ from the nominate in size, the color of their backs, and the base color and barring of their underparts. The differences are summarized in comparison to the nominate:

- C. r. yucatanensis, larger but variable, lighter barring on breast
- C. r. alleni, large, bronze-gold with red tinges above, black throat with white spots, narrow bars on breast, red on male's crown
- C. r. buenavistae, very large, bronzy back with reddish tinge, darkly barred rump, olive green bars on underparts
- C. r. meridensis, like buenavistae but somewhat smaller with a less bronzy back
- C. r. deltanus, small, greener back, and larger white spots on throat
- C. r. paraquensis, large, strong bronze tinge on back, dark dark gray crown with little red
- C. r. guianae, large, bronzy yellow-green back, very small pale throat spots, moderate amount of red on crown
- C. r. viridissimus, very large, bright yellow-green back, whitish base color and wide black barring on breast, male has less red on head
- C. r. nigriceps, like guianae but with little or no bronze
- C. r. trinitatis, like tobagensis but much smaller with a less heavy bill
- C. r. tobagensis, large, bronze-gold with red tinges above, black throat with white spots, medium-width greenish bars on breast
- C. r. gularis large, fine white throat spots, pale underparts, male has entirely red crown and female slightly less
- C. r. rubripileus, like gularis but smaller with blacker breast barring
- C. r. coloratus, slightly bronzy upperparts, bright yellow mostly unbarred belly, barred flanks
- C. r. chrysogaster, very bronzy back with red tinge, unbarred yellow belly, male has much red on crown
- C. r. canipileus, very bronzy back with red tinge, lightly barred yellow belly, male has much red on crown
- C. r. tucumanus, large, dull green and less bronzy back, whiter underparts with blackish barring

== Distribution and habitat ==
The golden-olive woodpecker inhabits a very wide variety of landscapes, mostly semi-open to dense. They range from dry tropical thornscrubs to humid rainforests. Between those extremes are cloudforests, oak-pine woodland, dry deciduous forests, riparian thickets, and mangroves. They are often also found along the edges of forest, in scattered trees within clearings, and shade-grown coffee plantations. In elevation, the species ranges from near sea level to 2,100 m (6,900 ft) in Mexico and between 750 and 2,150 m (2,500 and 7,100 ft) in Central America, from sea level to 2,800 m (9,200 ft) but usually between 350 and 2,100 m (1,100 and 6,900 ft) in Venezuela, between 900 and 3,100 m (3,000 and 10,200 ft) in Colombia, between 1,000 and 2,500 m (3,300 and 8,200 ft) in Argentina, and up to 2,300 m (7,500 ft) in Ecuador, Peru, and Bolivia.

== Behavior ==
=== Movement ===
As far as is known, the golden-olive woodpecker is a year-round resident throughout its range.

=== Feeding ===
The golden-olive woodpecker forages from the forest's mid level to the canopy, exploring the trunk, limbs, branches, and vines of large trees. It hunts by itself, in loose pairs, and as part of mixed species feeding flocks. It pecks, hammers, probes, prys, and sometimes gleans to capture its prey. Its primary diet is ants, termites, and wood-boring beetles and their larvae; it adds fruits and berries but rarely. A note published in 2016 added Müllerian bodies to its known diet. These are growths that Cecropia plants produce to feed ants in a symbiotic relationship.

=== Breeding ===
The golden-olive woodpecker's breeding season has not been determined for its whole range, but it appears to vary geographically. It breeds between January and May from Mexico to Colombia, from December or January to June or July in Ecuador and Peru, and the season perhaps includes October in Guyana. It excavates its nest cavity in a living or dead tree or palm, anywhere between 1.2 and 18 m (5 and 60 ft) above the ground. Both sexes incubate the clutch of two to four eggs but the incubation period is not known. Both parents provision nestlings by regurgitation for the approximately 24 days between hatch and fledging.

=== Vocal and non-vocal sounds ===
The golden-olive woodpecker's song is "a protracted rising rattling trill". Its other vocalizations include a repeated "loud, clear dree", a "single sharp deeeeh", a "sharp kyown", a "churr, choo-úr", a "liquid woick-woick-woick", and a "utzia-deek". It occasionally drums in "rolls very short, sometimes repeated at short intervals; sometimes as clearly separated strikes".

== Status ==
The IUCN has assessed the golden-olive woodpecker as being of Least Concern. It has an extremely large range but its population size is not known and is believed to be decreasing. No immediate threats have been identified. It is considered fairly common to common in most of its range and occurs in many protected areas. "This widespread species' ability to live in a wide variety of wooded habitats suggests that its future is secure."
