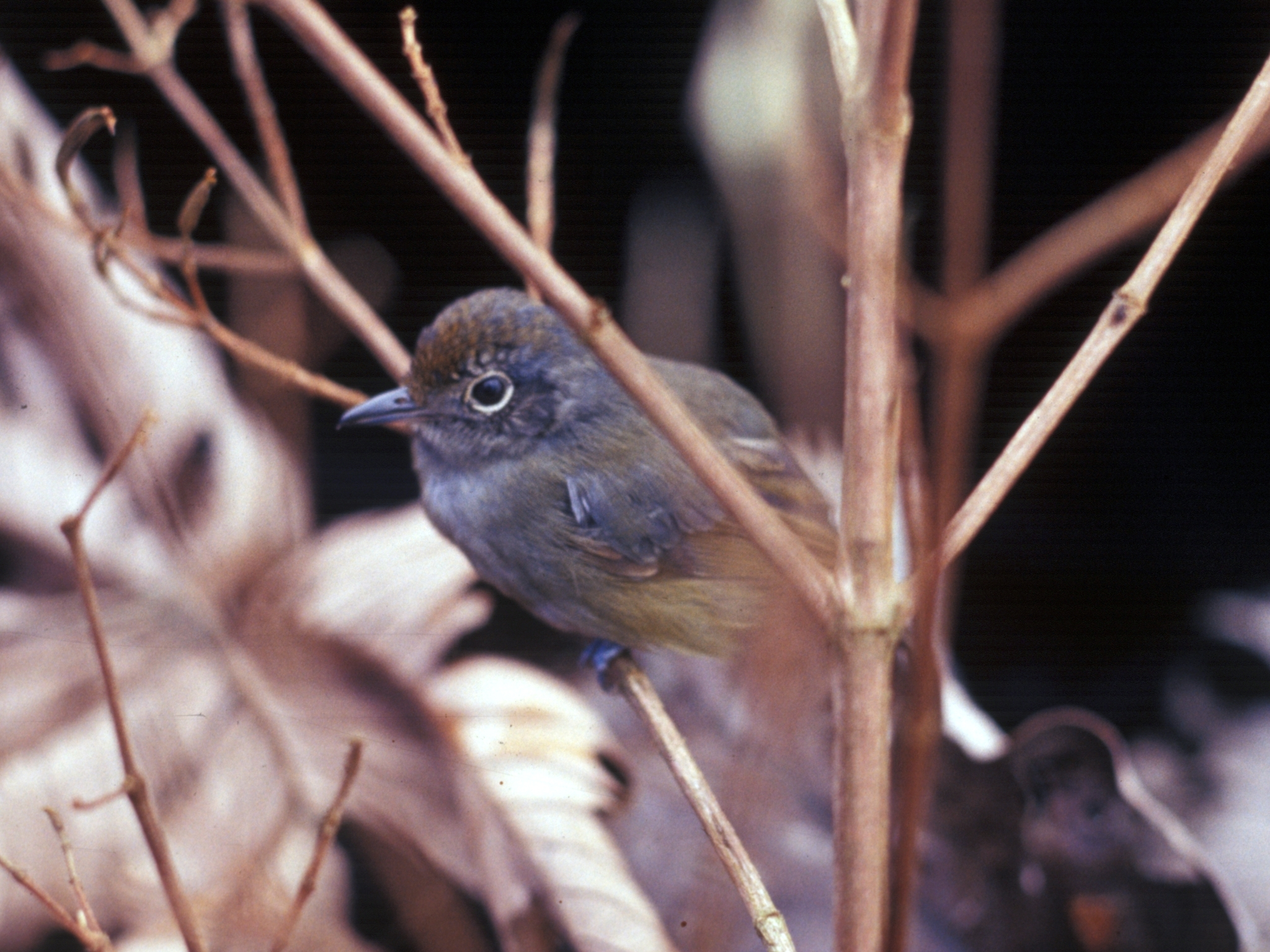
- Plain antvireo (Dysithamnus mentalis)

Scientific classification
- Kingdom: Animalia
- Phylum: Chordata
- Class: Aves
- Order: Passeriformes
- Family: Thamnophilidae
- Genus: Dysithamnus; Cabanis, 1847

Type species
- Myothera stictothorax Temminck, 1823

Species
- See text

= Dysithamnus =

Genus of birds

Dysithamnus is a genus of insectivorous passerine birds in the antbird family, Thamnophilidae. Species in this genus are known as antvireos.

== Taxonomy ==
The genus Dysithamnus was introduced by the German ornithologist Jean Cabanis in 1847. The name combines the Ancient Greek words duō "to plunge" and thamnos "bush". The type species was subsequently designated as the spot-breasted antvireo.

A molecular phylogenetic study published in 2020 found that the genus Dysithamnus was not monophyletic. The spot-crowned antvireo (Dysithamnus puncticeps) and the streak-crowned antvireo (Dysithamnus striaticeps) were sister to a clade containing the remaining species in the genus Dysithamnus and the antwrens in the genus Herpsilochmus.

The genus contains the following eight species:

Image	Common name	Scientific name	Distribution
	Spot-breasted antvireo	Dysithamnus sticothorax	Atlantic Forest
	Plain antvireo	Dysithamnus mentalis	Central America and northern South America
	Streak-crowned antvireo	Dysithamnus striaticeps	Central America
	Spot-crowned antvireo	Dysithamnus puncticeps	northern Panama and Tumbes–Chocó–Magdalena
	Rufous-backed antvireo	Dysithamnus xanthopterus	southern Atlantic Forest
	White-streaked antvireo	Dysithamnus leucostictus	northern Andes
	Plumbeous antvireo	Dysithamnus plumbeus	Bahia forests
	Bicolored antvireo	Dysithamnus occidentalis	northern Andes
