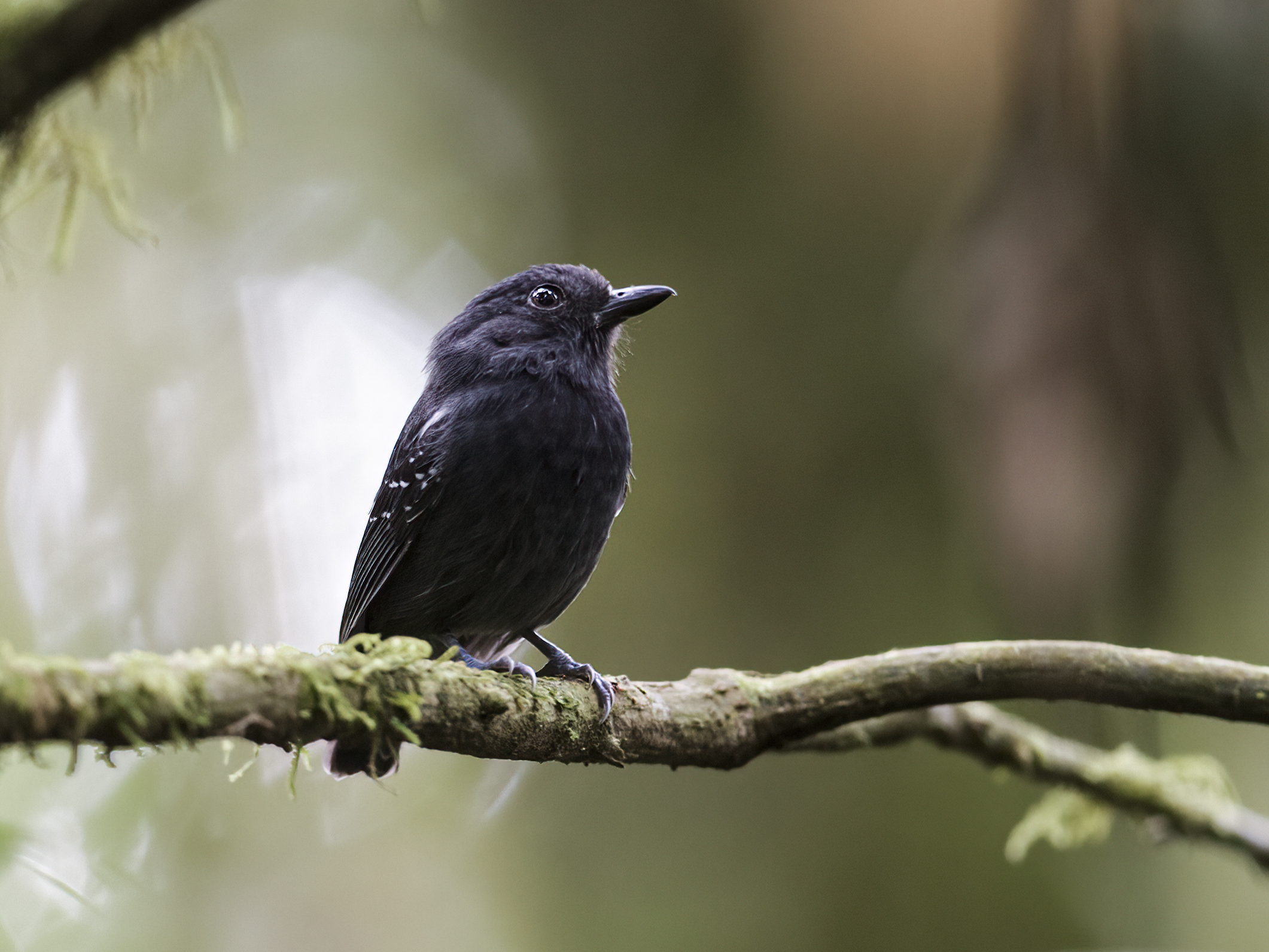
- Male
- White-streaked antvireo song

Conservation status
- Least Concern (IUCN 3.1)

Scientific classification
- Kingdom: Animalia
- Phylum: Chordata
- Class: Aves
- Order: Passeriformes
- Family: Thamnophilidae
- Genus: Dysithamnus
- Species: D. leucostictus

Binomial name
- Dysithamnus leucostictus Sclater, PL, 1858

= White-streaked antvireo =

Species of bird

The white-streaked antvireo or white-spotted antvireo (Dysithamnus leucostictus) is a species of bird in subfamily Thamnophilinae of family Thamnophilidae, the "typical antbirds". It is found in Colombia, Ecuador, Peru, Suriname, and Venezuela.

== Taxonomy and systematics ==
The white-streaked antvireo was described by the English zoologist Philip Sclater in 1858 and given the binomial name Dysithamnus leucostictus. The specific name is from the Ancient Greek leukos "white" and stiktos "spotted". At around 1970 it moved by at least one author to genus Thamnomanes. This treatment was not widely accepted and by the 1980s it was confirmed to belong in Dysithamnus.

The white-streaked antvireo and what is now the plumbeous antvireo (D. plumbeus) were for a time treated as conspecific; they were separated in the early 2000s. The white-streaked antvireo has two subspecies, the nominate D. l. leucostictus (Sclater, PL, 1858) and D. l. tucuyensis (Hartert, 1894). At least one author has treated the latter as a separate species, the "Venezuelan antvireo".

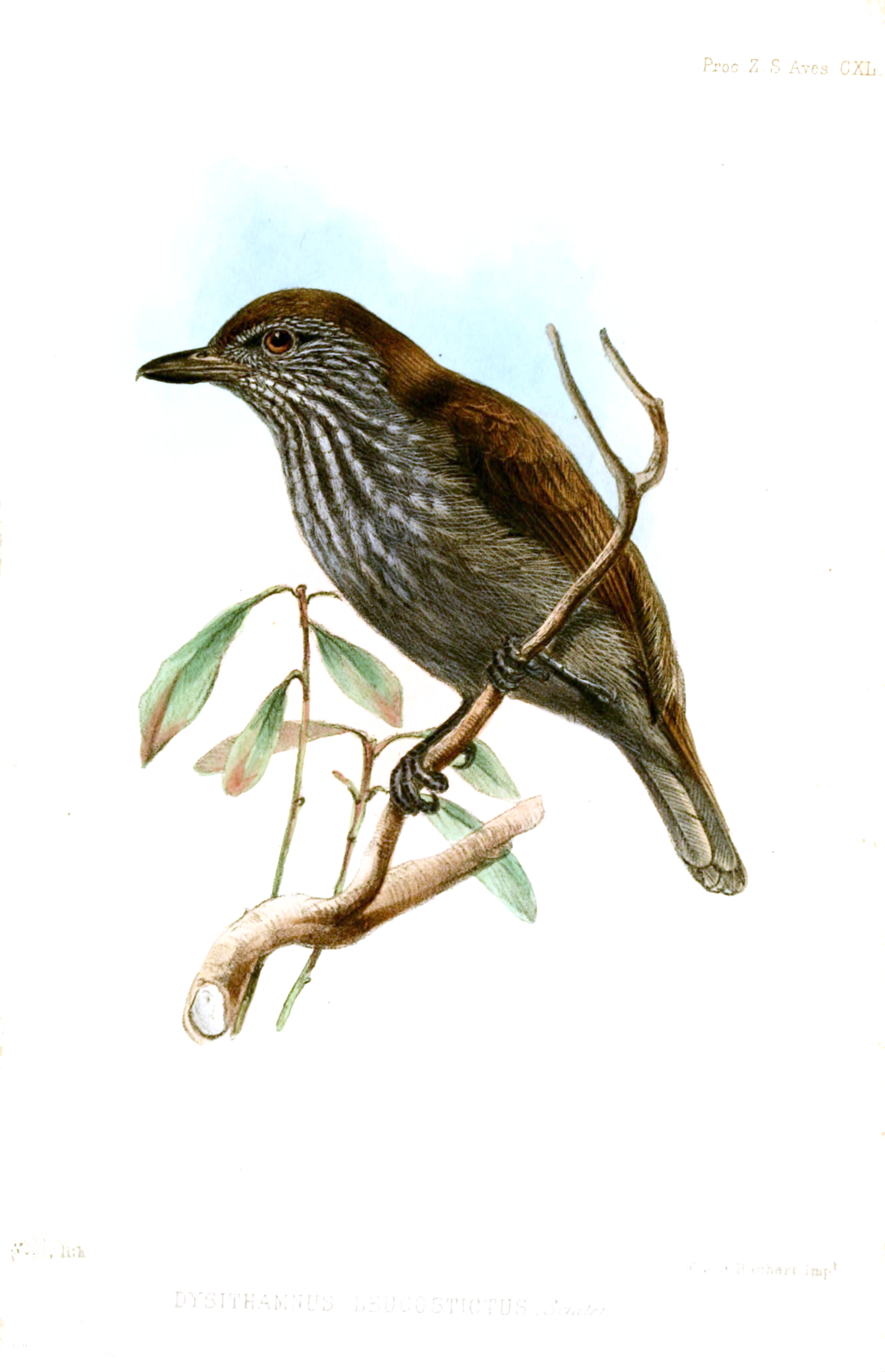
Female; illustration by Joseph Wolf, 1858

== Description ==
The white-streaked antvireo is 12 to 13 cm (4.7 to 5.1 in) long and weighs about 20 g (0.71 oz). Adult males of the nominate subspecies are mostly dark gray with a hidden white patch between the scapulars. Their wings are dark gray with white tips and edges on the coverts and their breast is a darker blackish gray than the upperparts. Adult females have a reddish brown crown, nape, upperparts, wings, and tail. The sides of their head, throat, and underparts are mostly gray with bold white streaks; their flanks and crissum have a brown tinge and no streaks. Subadult males are mostly gray with a rufous tinge; their wings are rufous-brown, their tail dark brown, their throat spotted with pale gray, and their underparts thinly streaked with white. Males of subspecies D. l. tucuyensis have more white on their coverts than the nominate, and white at the bend of the wing and on the outermost primaries. Females are paler than the nominate, with yellower upperparts, larger streaks on their underparts, and olive flanks and crissum.

== Distribution and habitat ==
The two subspecies of the white-streaked antvireo have widely separated ranges. The nominate is found on the east slope of the Andes from central Colombia's Cundinamarca Department south through eastern Ecuador and slightly into northern Peru's departments of Cajamarca and Amazonas. D. l. tucuyensis is found in the Venezuelan Coastal Ranges from Falcón and Lara east to Miranda and further east in Monagas. It also has a small population on Tafelberg, a tepui in central Suriname.

The white-streaked antvireo inhabits the understorey of montane evergreen forest. In elevation it ranges between 900 and 1,800 m (3,000 and 5,900 ft) in Colombia, mostly between 1,300 and 1,800 m (4,300 and 5,900 ft) in Ecuador, between 1,350 and 1,850 m (4,400 and 6,100 ft) in Peru, and between 500 and 1,900 m (1,600 and 6,200 ft) in Venezuela. On Tafelberg it occurs at about 1,000 m (3,300 ft).

== Behavior ==
=== Movement ===
The plumbeous antvireo is thought to be a year-round resident throughout its range.

=== Feeding ===
The white-streaked antvireo's diet is not known in detail but is mostly insects and other arthropods. It typically forages in pairs, and usually as part of a mixed-species feeding flock. It typically feeds about 1.5 to 4 m (5 to 13 ft) above the ground but frequently drops to the ground to capture prey. It feeds from live leaves, vines, and twigs by gleaning or jumping up from a perch.

=== Breeding ===
Nothing is known about the white-streaked antvireo's breeding biology.

=== Vocalization ===
The song of the white-streaked antvireo's nominate subspecies is "a short...easily countable series of strong whistles, pitch falling (except sometimes for initial note), first and last notes less intense". It has been written as "wee WEE wee wee wee whew". The song of subspecies D. l. tucuyensis is "a moderately long...barely countable series of strong whistles, pitch and intensity gradually rising to middle notes, then gradually declining".

== Status ==
The IUCN originally in 2004 assessed the white-streaked antvireo as being of Least Concern. In 2012 it was uplisted to Vulnerable and in 2020 returned to being of Least Concern. It has a large range; its population size is not known and is believed to be decreasing. "The only threat known to this species is habitat loss. It appears to be restricted to little-disturbed primary forest, and as such is likely to be particularly susceptible to fragmentation and edge effects." It is considered uncommon in Colombia and uncommon and local in Ecuador and Peru. In those countries, "Andean foothill forests in general are being cleared for agriculture and human settlement at an alarming rate". It "can be locally common" in Venezuela, where it occurs in several protected areas.
