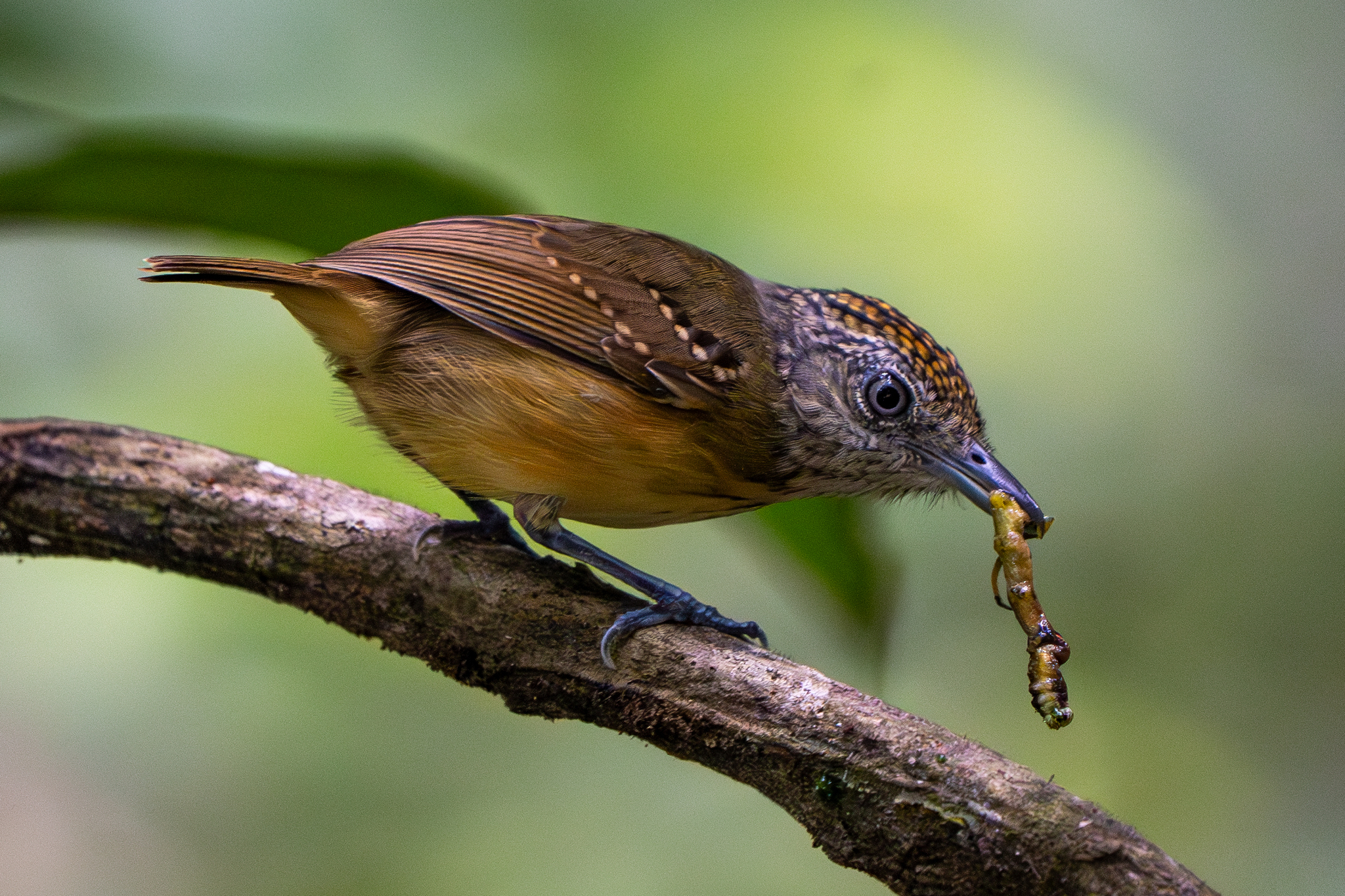

Conservation status
- Least Concern (IUCN 3.1)

Scientific classification
- Kingdom: Animalia
- Phylum: Chordata
- Class: Aves
- Order: Passeriformes
- Family: Thamnophilidae
- Genus: Dysithamnus
- Species: D. puncticeps

Binomial name
- Dysithamnus puncticeps Salvin, 1866

= Spot-crowned antvireo =

Species of bird

The spot-crowned antvireo (Dysithamnus puncticeps) is a species of bird in subfamily Thamnophilinae of family Thamnophilidae, the "typical antbirds". It is found in Colombia, Costa Rica, Ecuador, and Panama.

== Taxonomy and systematics ==
The spot-crowned antvireo is monotypic. It and the streak-crowned antvireo (D. striaticeps) are closely related and may form a superspecies.

== Description ==
The spot-crowned antvireo is 10 to 12 cm (3.9 to 4.7 in) long and weighs 15 to 17 g (0.53 to 0.60 oz). Adult males have a dark gray forehead, crown, and nape heavily marked with white spots. Their ear coverts are grayish. Their upperparts are grayish olive with a hidden white patch between the scapulars. Their flight feathers are dark grayish olive with wide buffy grayish edges; their wing coverts are blackish with white tips. Their tail is dark grayish olive with white tips on the feathers. Their throat, breast, and upper belly are white with dark streaks, their sides olive-gray, and their belly and undertail coverts whitish with an ochraceous tinge. Adult females have a rufous crown and nape with dark spots and pale buff ear coverts. Their wing coverts are less black than the male's. Their throat, breast, and belly center are pale buff and their sides, flanks, lower belly, and undertail coverts are ochraceous.

== Distribution and habitat ==
The spot-crowned antvireo is found from Cahuita in Costa Rica's Limón Province south through Panama on the Caribbean slope and on the Pacific slope from Panamá Province. Its range continues into Colombia on the lower reaches of the Cauca River and along the country's Pacific slope into northwestern Ecuador as far as Manabí and Santo Domingo de los Tsáchilas provinces. It primarily inhabits the understorey to mid-storey of evergreen forest in the lowlands and foothills. In elevation it ranges from sea level to 800 m (2,600 ft) in Costa Rica, to 500 m (1,600 ft) in Panama, to 1,000 m (3,300 ft) in Colombia, and to 800 m (2,600 ft) in Ecuador.

== Behavior ==
=== Movement ===
The spot-crowned antvireo is thought to be a year-round resident throughout its range.

=== Feeding ===
The spot-crowned antvireo feeds mostly on insects and its diet also includes other arthropods like spiders. It usually forages in pairs or family groups, and frequently as part of a mixed-species feeding flock. It typically feeds between about 3 and 8 m (10 and 25 ft) above the ground. It feeds deliberately, generally by gleaning from live foliage while perched. It also often makes short sallies to hover-glean or to snatch prey from overhanging leaves. It has been observed following army ants for brief periods.

=== Breeding ===
The spot-crowned antvireo breeds between April and July in Panama and nest-building has been recorded in late August in Colombia. Its breeding season elsewhere has not been determined. One nest was a cup hanging from a branch fork 2 m (7 ft) above the ground. It contained two eggs and both parents incubated them. The incubation period, time to fledging, and other details of parental care are not known.

=== Vocalization ===
The spot-crowned antvireo's song is "a rapid...trill, notes not countable, pitch first rising slightly, falling slightly terminally, pace constant initially, then accelerating slightly towards end". Its calls include a "short descending 'chirr' ".

== Status ==
The IUCN has assessed the spot-crowned antvireo as being of Least Concern. It has a large range and an unknown population size that is believed to be decreasing. No immediate threats have been identified. It is considered fairly common to uncommon across its range. Its range includes several large protected areas including at least one in each country.
