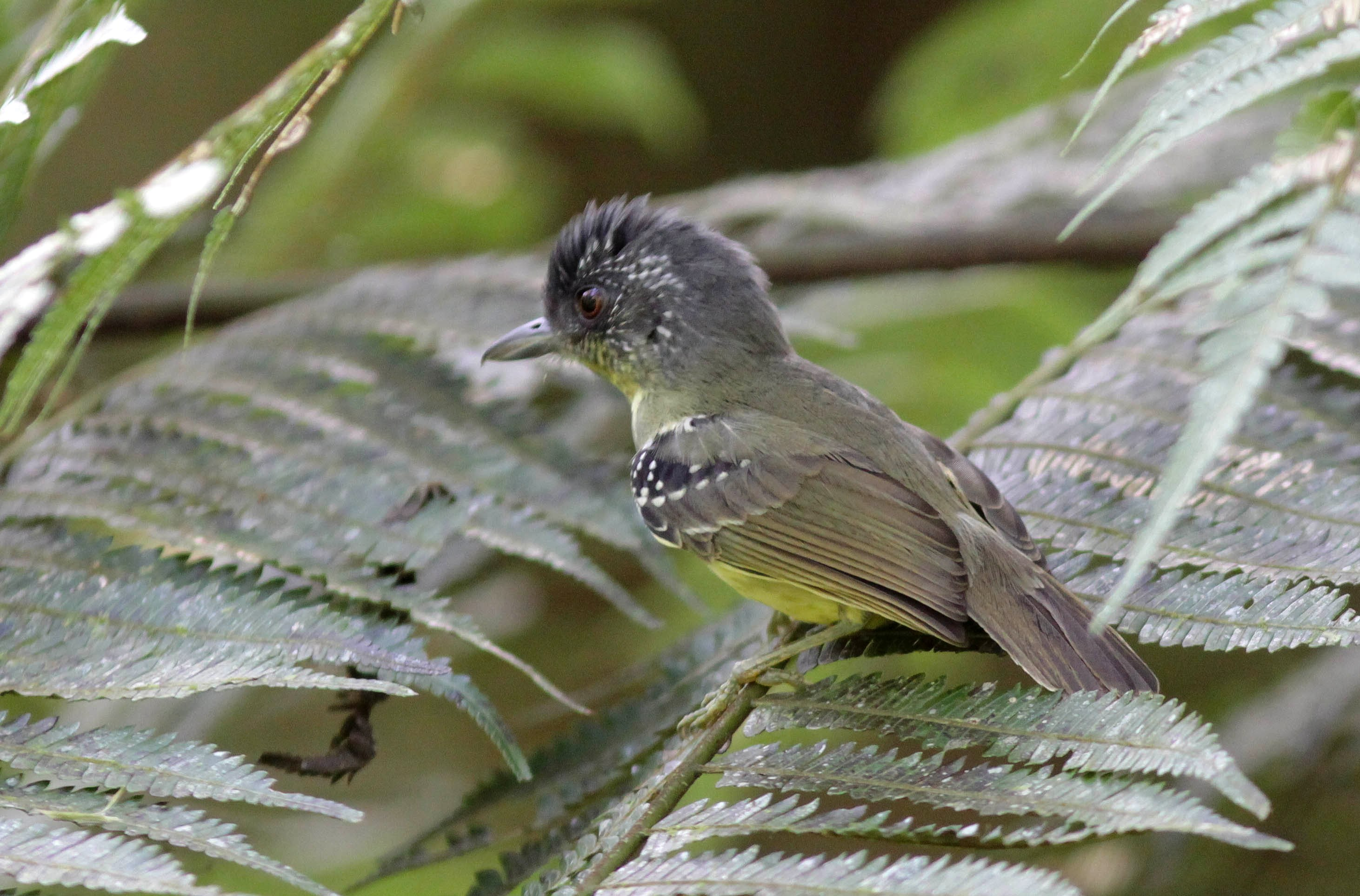
- Male - southeast Brazil

Conservation status
- Near Threatened (IUCN 3.1)

Scientific classification
- Kingdom: Animalia
- Phylum: Chordata
- Class: Aves
- Order: Passeriformes
- Family: Thamnophilidae
- Genus: Dysithamnus
- Species: D. stictothorax

Binomial name
- Dysithamnus stictothorax (Temminck, 1823)

= Spot-breasted antvireo =

Species of bird

The spot-breasted antvireo (Dysithamnus stictothorax) is a Near Threatened species of bird in subfamily Thamnophilinae of family Thamnophilidae, the "typical antbirds". It is endemic to Brazil.

== Taxonomy and systematics ==
The spot-breasted antvireo was described by the Dutch zoologist Coenraad Jacob Temminck in 1823 and given the binomial name Myothera strictothorax (an error for stictothorax)). The specific epithet is from the Ancient Greek stiktos "spotted" and thōrax or thōrakos "breastplate". It is now placed in the genus Dysithamnus which was introduced by the German ornithologist Jean Cabanis in 1847.

The spot-breasted antvireo is monotypic.

== Description ==
The spot-breasted antvireo is about 12 cm (4.7 in) long. Adult males have a dark gray forehead and crown, blackish ear coverts, and white spots on the sides of their head. Their upperparts are grayish olive with a hidden white patch between the scapulars. Their wings are blackish with wide chestnut-rufous edges on the flight feathers and white tips on the coverts. Their tail is rufous-olive with narrow white tips on the feathers. Their throat and upper breast are white and the rest of their underparts mostly yellowish. Their breast has large dark spots and the sides of their underparts have a grayish cast. Adult females have a chestnut crown. Their upperparts and wings are more olive and less gray than the male's and they lack the white interscapular patch. Their underparts have fewer spots than do males'.

== Distribution and habitat ==
The spot-breasted antvireo is found in coastal southeastern Brazil from southeastern Bahia south to Santa Catarina and somewhat inland in Minas Gerais. Though some sources include northeastern Argentina's Misiones Province in its range, the South American Classification Committee of the American Ornithological Society has no records from there.

The spot-breasted antvireo inhabits the understorey to mid-storey of evergreen forest in the lowland and lower montane regions. It favors the forest's edges, such as along roads and around natural clearings. In elevation it ranges from sea level to 1,250 m (4,100 ft).

== Behavior ==
=== Movement ===
The spot-breasted antvireo is thought to be a year-round resident throughout its range.

=== Feeding ===
The spot-breasted antvireo feeds mostly on insects; its diet also includes other arthropods and occasionally Rapanea mistletoe berries. It usually forages singly or in pairs, and often joins mixed-species feeding flocks. It typically feeds from near the ground to about 10 m (33 ft) above it. It feeds actively and acrobatically, generally by gleaning while perched from live foliage, vines, stems, thin branches, and clusters of dead leaves. It often stretches or hangs from the perch to catch prey and about as often makes short sallies to hover-glean. It sometimes makes short jumps to catch prey.

=== Breeding ===
One active spot-breasted antvireo nest has been photographed. It was found in November and contained a nestling. It was a small cup hanging from a fork in a branch about 15 m (50 ft) above the ground.

=== Vocalization ===
The spot-breasted antvireo's song is a "rather hurried series of some 20 mellow, slightly staccato, rising and falling notes, the last 3-5 accelerated". Its calls include a "short, upslurred 'chirr', [a] nasal 'qwark', and a series of three notes with first two on same pitch".

== Status ==
The IUCN has assessed the spot-breated antvireo as Near Threatened. It has a small range and its population size is not known and is believed to be decreasing. "Current key threats are urbanisation, industrialisation, agricultural expansion, colonisation and associated road-building." It is considered fairly common in most of its range, occurs in some protected areas, and "survives well in selectively logged forest". However, "the region which it inhabits has suffered severe habitat loss ...and this and other species that are confined to it require monitoring".
