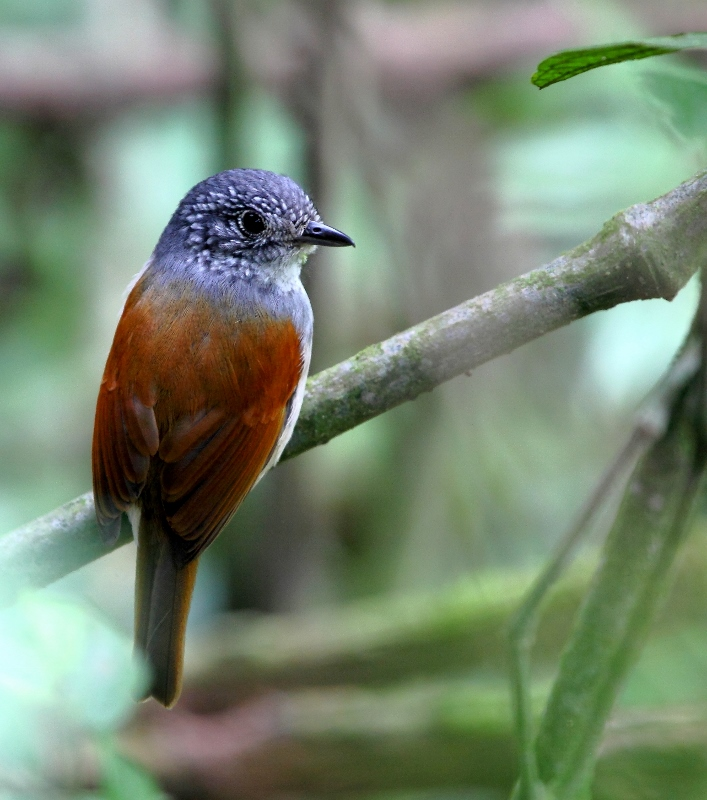
- Male at Campos do Jordão, São Paulo State, Brazil

Conservation status
- Least Concern (IUCN 3.1)

Scientific classification
- Kingdom: Animalia
- Phylum: Chordata
- Class: Aves
- Order: Passeriformes
- Family: Thamnophilidae
- Genus: Dysithamnus
- Species: D. xanthopterus

Binomial name
- Dysithamnus xanthopterus Burmeister, 1856

= Rufous-backed antvireo =

Species of bird

The rufous-backed antvireo (Dysithamnus xanthopterus) is a species of bird in subfamily Thamnophilinae of family Thamnophilidae, the "typical antbirds". It is endemic to Brazil.

== Taxonomy and systematics ==
The rufous-backed antvireo is monotypic.

== Description ==
The rufous-backed antvireo is about 12 cm (4.7 in) long. Adult males have a gray forehead, crown, nape, and upper back; their forehead, upper sides of the face, and lores have white spots. Their rest of their upperparts, wings, and tail are rufous. The center of their throat is white. Most of their underparts are pale gray (that is almost white on the belly) and their flanks are ochraceous. Adult females have a rufous crown and the spots on their face are pale buff. Most of their underparts are also pale buff, with pale olivaceous sides and flanks.

== Distribution and habitat ==
The rufous-backed antvireo is native to the Serra do Mar coastal forests, primarily between Rio de Janeiro and Paraná states. Since 2013 there have been scattered records from further south in Santa Catarina. The species inhabits the mid-storey to the subcanopy of montane evergreen forest and mature secondary forest. In elevation it ranges between 750 and 1,700 m (2,500 and 5,600 ft).

== Behavior ==
=== Movement ===
The rufous-backed antvireo is thought to be a year-round resident throughout its range.

=== Feeding ===
The rufous-backed antvireo feeds mostly on insects and its diet also includes other arthropods and the berries of Rapanea mistletoe. It usually forages singly or in pairs, and frequently as part of a mixed-species feeding flock. It typically feeds between about 3 and 12 m (10 and 40 ft) above the ground, especially in the outer parts of trees, in the tops of bamboo, and in woody vine tangles. It feeds mostly with short sallies to snatch prey from overhanging leaves. It also gleans by reaching or lunging while perched. It has not been observed following army ants.

=== Breeding ===
The rufous-backed antwren's breeding season appears to span from September to February. Its only known nest was an open cup of plant fibers thickly covered with moss placed in a branch fork 1.8 m (6 ft) above the ground. It held two eggs. The incubation period, time to fledging, and details of parental care are not known.

=== Vocalization ===
The rufous-backed antwren's song is a "very high, rapid series of a descending, shivering, whistled rattle". It calls include "a short, low-pitched muffled note...sounding like 'quock' " and "a short, harsh bark".

== Status ==
The IUCN has assessed the rufous-backed antvireo as being of Least Concern. It has a large range and an unknown population size that is believed to be decreasing. No immediate threats have been identified. It occurs in a few protected areas. It is considered uncommon and local and so "warrants continued monitoring".
