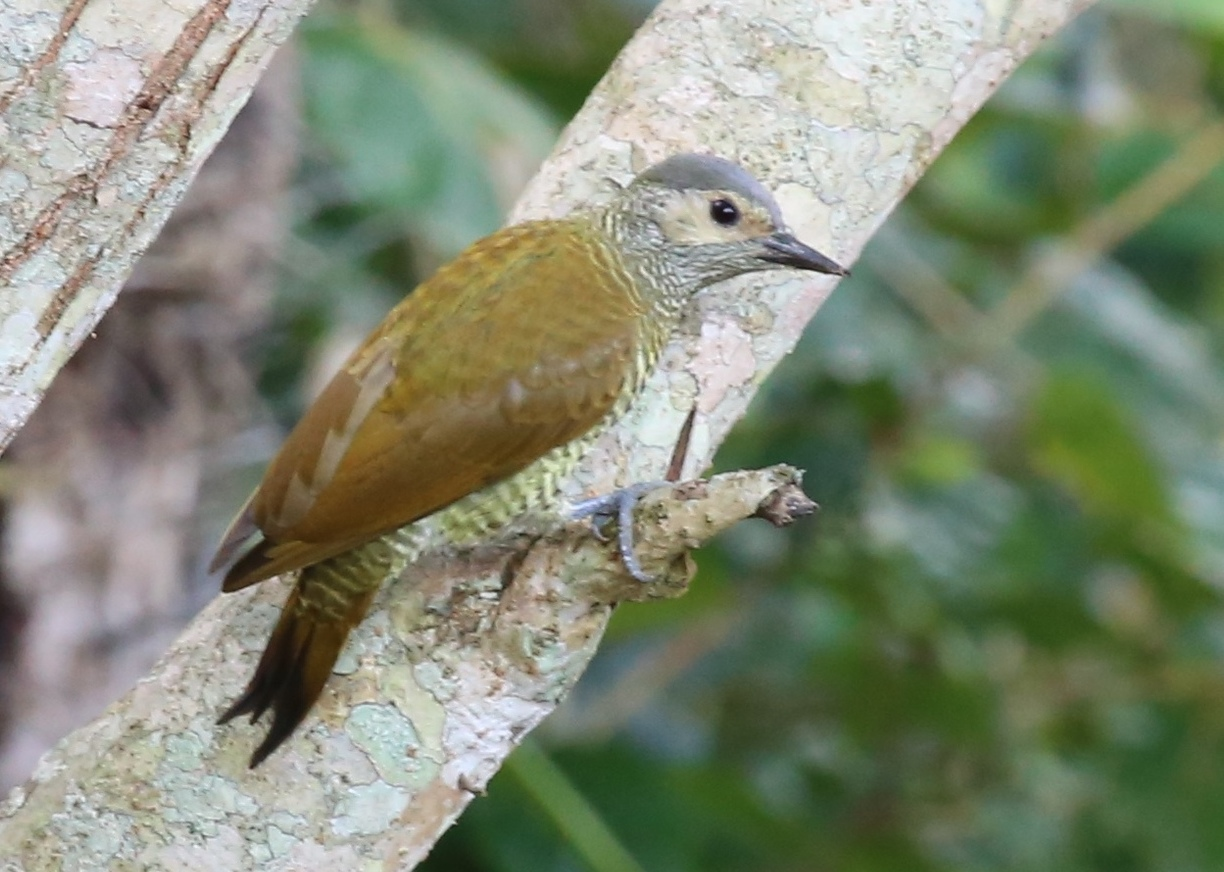

Conservation status
- Least Concern (IUCN 3.1)

Scientific classification
- Kingdom: Animalia
- Phylum: Chordata
- Class: Aves
- Order: Piciformes
- Family: Picidae
- Genus: Colaptes
- Species: C. auricularis

Binomial name
- Colaptes auricularis (Salvin & Godman, 1889)

Synonyms
- Piculus auricularis (Salvin & Godman, 1889)

= Grey-crowned woodpecker =

Species of bird

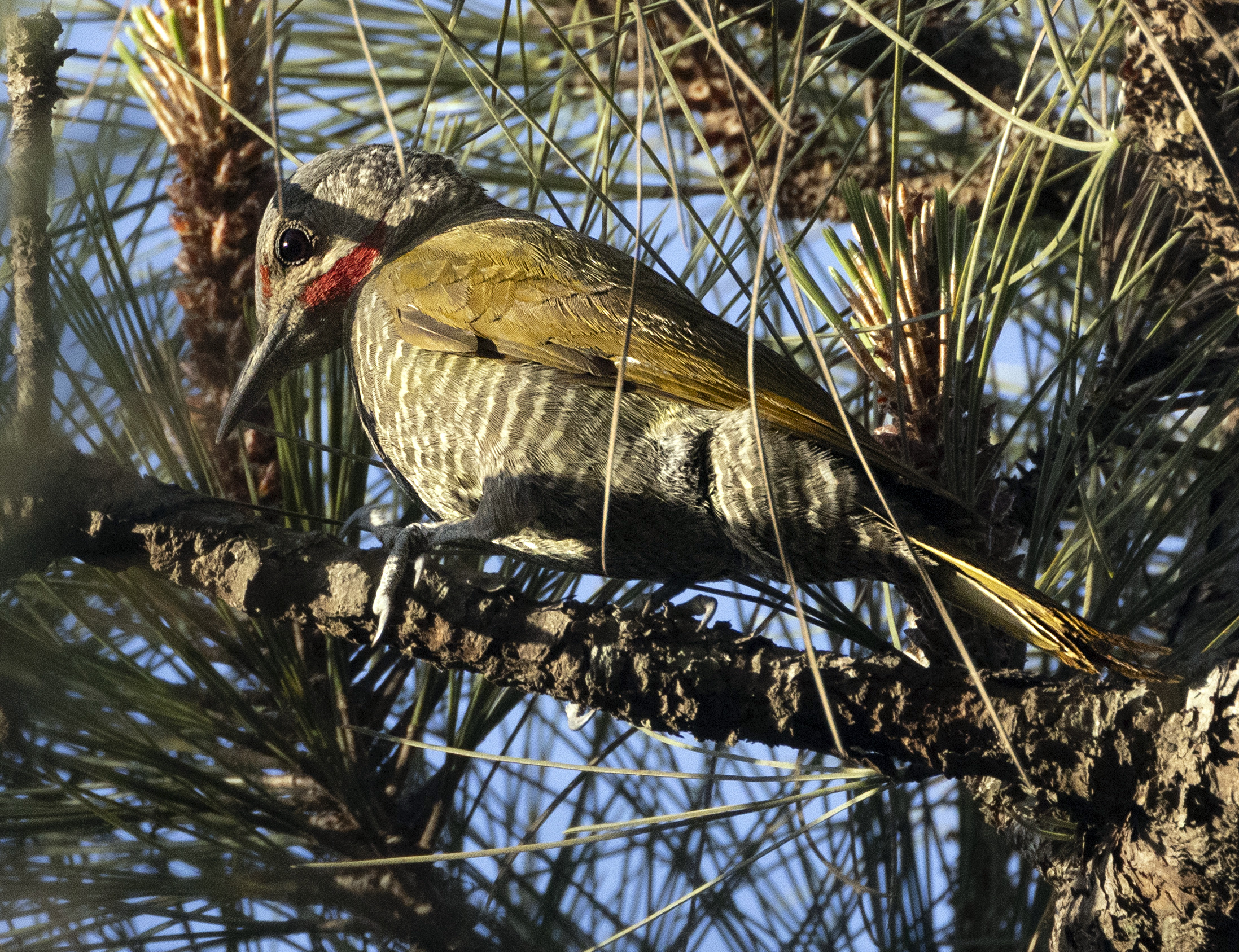
Cabo Corrientes Area, Jalisco, Mexico

The grey-crowned woodpecker (Colaptes auricularis) is a species of bird in subfamily Picinae of the woodpecker family Picidae. It is endemic to western Mexico.

== Taxonomy and systematics ==
The grey-crowned woodpecker was originally described as Chloronerpes auricularis. It was later placed in genus Piculus but since about 2007 has been moved into Colaptes by taxonomic systems.

The grey-crowned woodpecker is similar to the wide-ranging golden-olive woodpecker (C. rubiginosus) and has been treated as a subspecies of it. Some authors have treated the two as a superspecies. In addition, research since 2010 has found that the golden-olive woodpecker is not monophyletic, with some subspecies being more closely related to the grey-crowned woodpecker than they are to other golden-olive subspecies.

The specific epithet auricularis means "eared", an appearance created by the confluent, fine patterning of the species' head.

The grey-crowned woodpecker is monotypic.

== Description ==
The grey-crowned woodpecker is 19.5 to 21 cm (7.7 to 8.3 in) long and weighs about 65 g (2.3 oz). Males and females have the same plumage except on their heads. Adult males have a light gray crown and nape. They are pale brownish buff on their lores and sides of the head, sometimes with indistinct grayish bars. They have a wide red stripe below the brownish buff and a dull white chin and upper throat; the last has dull grayish bars. Adult females have no red on their head. Both sexes have mostly pale olive to olive green upperparts; their rump and uppertail coverts are barred with pale yellow or yellowish white. Their wings are a brighter olive green than the back. Their tail is pale yellowish olive green with dusky tips on the central feathers and sometimes darker bars or spots on the outer ones. Their underparts are yellowish white or pale yellowish with irregular olive bars. Their bill is dark gray, their iris brown, and the legs gray. Juveniles resemble adult females with less distinct barring on the underparts; the male's red facial stripe is mixed with gray.

== Distribution and habitat ==
The grey-crowned woodpecker is found in western Mexico from southern Sonora and Chihuahua to southern Oaxaca. It inhabits the interior and edges of semi-humid and humid forest, and is also found locally in pine-oak forest. In elevation it ranges from near sea level to 2,400 m (7,900 ft).

== Behavior ==
=== Movement ===
The grey-crowned woodpecker is a year-round resident throughout its range.

=== Feeding ===
The grey-crowned woodpecker forages at all levels from the ground to the forest canopy. Its diet is not known in detail but does include termites, other invertebrates, and berries.

=== Breeding ===
The grey-crowned woodpecker's breeding season has not been fully determined but includes at least March and April. Nothing else is known about its breeding biology.

=== Vocal and non-vocal sounds ===
What is thought to be the grey-crowned woodpecker's song is "a rapid, shrill, churring rattle". It also makes "a sharp, slightly explosive kea'ah [and] a gruff mewing growh". Its drum is "short and rapid".

== Status ==
The IUCN has assessed the grey-crowned woodpecker as being of Least Concern. It has a large range and an estimated population of at least 20,000 mature individuals; however, the latter is believed to be decreasing. No immediate threats have been identified. "Gray-crowned Woodpecker faces heightened risk because of its specialization on threatened tropical highland forest habitats. The primary threat to this species is loss of this habitat type due to conversion to agriculture, wood harvesting, and livestock grazing."
