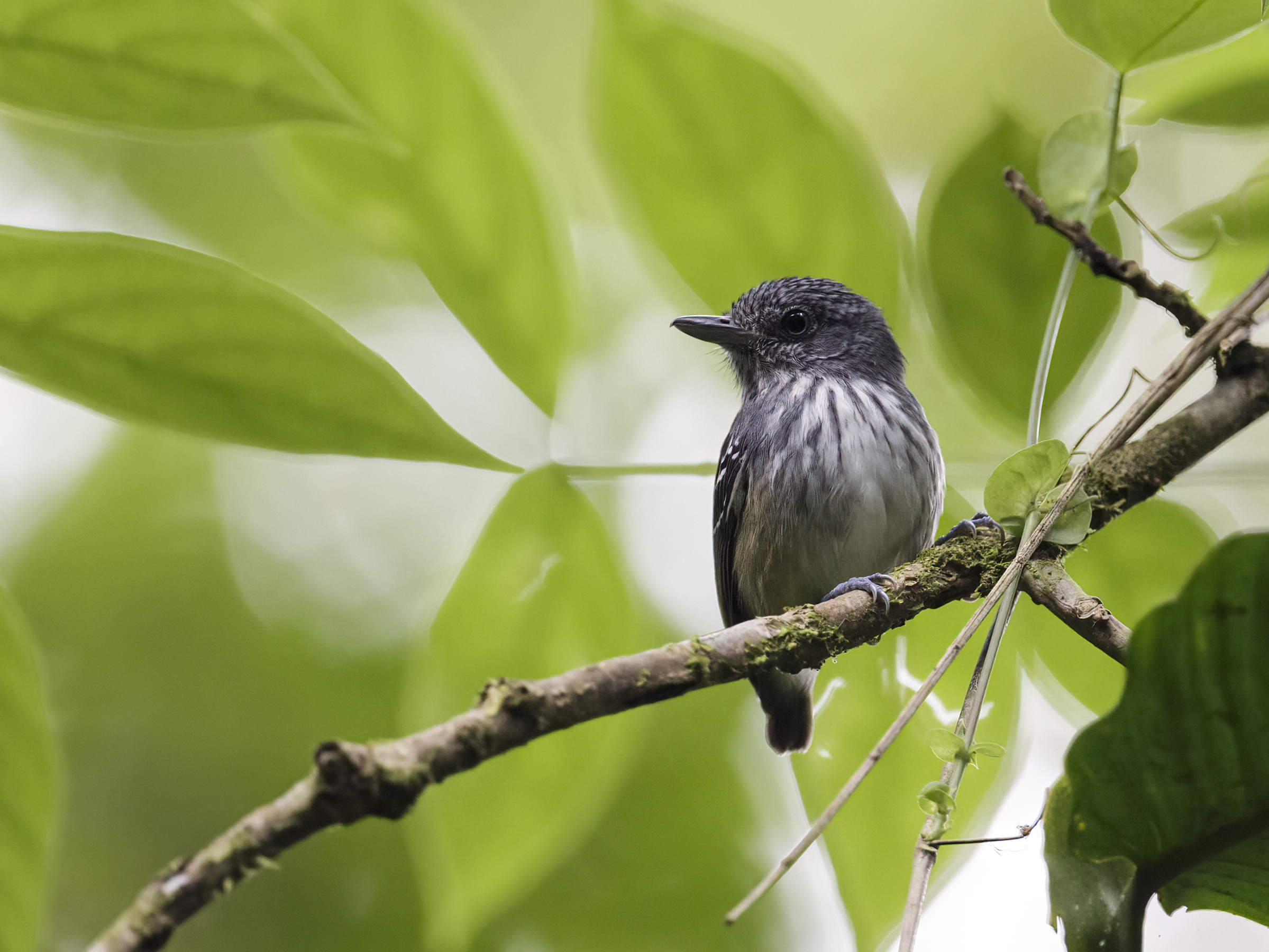

Conservation status
- Least Concern (IUCN 3.1)

Scientific classification
- Kingdom: Animalia
- Phylum: Chordata
- Class: Aves
- Order: Passeriformes
- Family: Thamnophilidae
- Genus: Dysithamnus
- Species: D. striaticeps

Binomial name
- Dysithamnus striaticeps Lawrence, 1865

= Streak-crowned antvireo =

Species of bird

The streak-crowned antvireo (Dysithamnus striaticeps) is a species of bird in subfamily Thamnophilinae of family Thamnophilidae, the "typical antbirds". It is found in Costa Rica, Honduras, and Nicaragua.

== Taxonomy and systematics ==
The streak-crowned antvireo is monotypic. It and the spot-crowned antvireo (D. puncticeps) are closely related and may form a superspecies.

== Description ==
The streak-crowned antvireo is 10 to 11 cm (3.9 to 4.3 in) long and weighs 15 to 17 g (0.53 to 0.60 oz). Adult males have a dark gray forehead, crown, and nape with heavy grayish white streaking. Their ear coverts are blackish. Their upperparts are grayish olive with a hidden white patch between the scapulars. Their flight feathers are dark grayish olive with wide buffy grayish edges; their wing coverts are blackish with white tips. Their tail is dark grayish olive with narrow white tips on the feathers. Their throat and breast are white with prominent dark streaks, their sides olive-gray, their belly whitish, and their undertail coverts whitish with a yellowish tinge. Adult females have a rufous crown and nape with dark spots. Their wing coverts are less black than the male's and their breast and flanks are ochraceous. Subadult males resemble adult females but with grayer upperparts and whiter underparts.

== Distribution and habitat ==
The streak-crowned antvireo is found from extreme southeastern Honduras along the Caribbean slope through Nicaragua and most of Costa Rica, and also across northern Costa Rica into Guanacaste Province. It primarily inhabits the understorey to mid-storey of evergreen forest in the lowlands and foothills, and much less frequently is found in mature secondary forest. In elevation it ranges from sea level to 400 m (1,300 ft) in Honduras and to 800 m (2,600 ft) in Nicaragua and Costa Rica.

== Behavior ==
=== Movement ===
The streak-crowned antvireo is thought to be a year-round resident throughout its range.

=== Feeding ===
The streak-crowned antvireo feeds mostly on insects and its diet also includes other arthropods like spiders. It usually forages singly or in pairs, and usually as part of a mixed-species feeding flock. It typically feeds between about 1.5 and 8 m (5 and 25 ft) above the ground. It feeds deliberately, generally by gleaning while perched from live foliage, vines, stems, and thin branches. It often makes short sallies to hover-glean or to snatch prey from overhanging leaves.

=== Breeding ===
The streak-crowned antvireo breeds between March and June in Costa Rica; its season elsewhere has not been defined. It makes a cup nest, usually of fibers from the stem of a fern with moss on the outside; tendrils of moss may dangle below the cup. It usually is suspended in the fork of a branch between about 1.5 and 4 m (5 and 15 ft) above the ground. The clutch is two eggs. The incubation period is at least 14 days; the time to fledging is not known. Both parents incubate the clutch and brood and provision nestlings.

=== Vocalization ===
The streak-crowned antvireo's song is "a long...series in which notes initially rise in pitch and intensity, remain constant, then gradually shorten, weaken and descend in pitch". It has been written as "kepkepkepkepkepkrrrrrrr" and "peu-peu-peu-Peu-Peu-Peu-Pip-Pip-Pip-Pip'Pip'Pip'Pip'Pip'peu". Its calls include "soft single or double whistles" and a "short 'chirr' ".

== Status ==
The IUCN has assessed the streak-crowned antvireo as being of Least Concern. It has a somewhat restricted range and an unknown population size that is believed to be decreasing. No immediate threats have been identified. It is considered generally fairly common to uncommon across its range though rare to uncommon in Honduras and very uncommon in the Caribbean lowlands of Costa Rica. "Although ongoing clearing of forest for agriculture is of concern throughout the region, this species has viable populations in a number of protected parks and reserves in Costa Rica".
