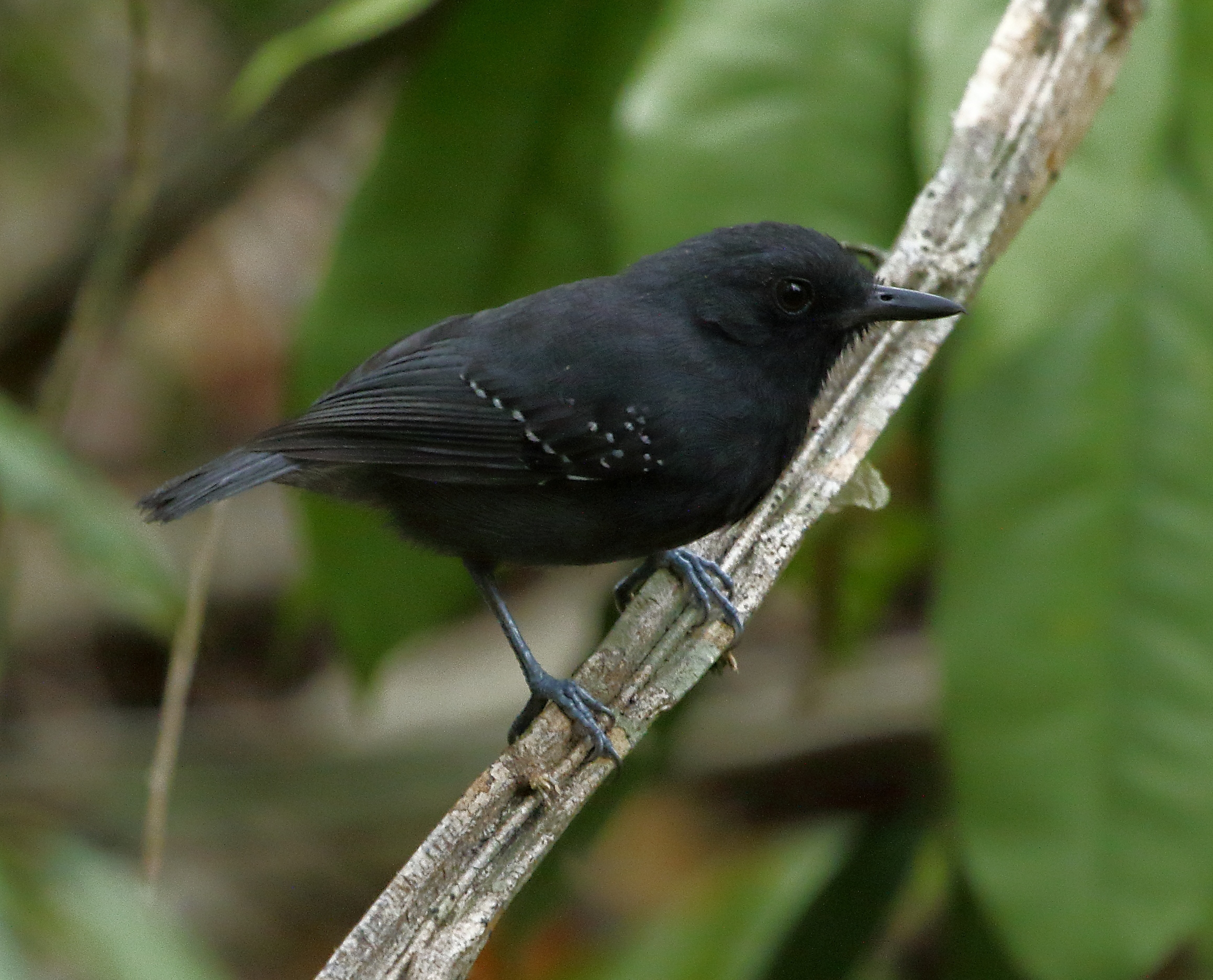
- Male

Conservation status
- Vulnerable (IUCN 3.1)

Scientific classification
- Kingdom: Animalia
- Phylum: Chordata
- Class: Aves
- Order: Passeriformes
- Family: Thamnophilidae
- Genus: Dysithamnus
- Species: D. plumbeus

Binomial name
- Dysithamnus plumbeus (Wied, 1831)

= Plumbeous antvireo =

Species of bird

The plumbeous antvireo (Dysithamnus plumbeus) is a Vulnerable species of bird in subfamily Thamnophilinae of family Thamnophilidae, the "typical antbirds". It is endemic to Brazil.

== Taxonomy and systematics ==
The plumbeous antvireo was originally described in genus Myiothera, which is no longer in use. It was eventually transferred to Dysithamnus but around 1970 was moved by at least one author to genus Thamnomanes. This treatment was not widely accepted and by the 1980s it was confirmed to belong in Dysithamnus.

The plumbeous antvireo and what is now the white-streaked antvireo (D. leucostictus) were for a time treated as conspecific; they were separated in the early 2000s. The plumbeous antvireo is monotypic.

== Description ==
The plumbeous antvireo is about 12 to 13 cm (4.7 to 5.1 in) long. Adult males have a dark gray head, upperparts, and tail with a hidden white patch between the scapulars. Their wings are black with white tips and edges on the coverts. Their underparts are a darker blackish gray than the upperparts. Adult females have an olive-brown head and upperparts with buff-white spots on the wing coverts. Their throat is very pale gray, their breast olive-brown, and their belly and crissum ochraceous.

== Distribution and habitat ==
The plumbeous antvireo is found locally in southeastern Brazil in an area roughly bounded by southern Bahia, eastern Minas Gerais, Espírito Santo, and northern Rio de Janeiro states. It is a bird of the Atlantic Forest, where it inhabits the understory of evergreen forest. It occurs almost exclusively in primary or slightly disturbed forest and favors overgrown openings such as those created by fallen trees. In elevation it mostly occurs below 600 m (2,000 ft) but is found as high as 900 m (3,000 ft).

== Behavior ==
=== Movement ===
The plumbeous antvireo is thought to be a year-round resident throughout its range.

=== Feeding ===
The plumbeous antvireo's diet is not known in detail but is mostly insects and other arthropods. It usually forages singly or in pairs, and sometimes as part of a mixed-species feeding flock that passes through its territory. It typically feeds within about 2 m (7 ft) of the ground but sometimes to twice that height, and readily feeds on the ground. It feeds mostly while perched by gleaning from live leaves, vines, and twigs. It also probes dead leaf clusters.

=== Breeding ===
The plumbeous antvireo's breeding season is thought to span August to December. The one known nest was 0.3 m (1 ft) above the ground in a small shrub. It contained two eggs that the female was incubating. Nothing else is known about the species' breeding biology.

=== Vocalization ===
The plumbeous antvireo's song is a "slow series of 6-8 evenly spaced, rising and falling, sad-sounding notes".

== Status ==
The IUCN originally in 1988 assessed the plumbeous antvireo as Threatened and since 1994 as Vulnerable. It occupies small areas within its restricted overall range and its estimated population of between 2500 and 15,000 mature individuals is believed to be decreasing. "The fragmentation of the species's range by extensive forest clearance has been and remains the one significant threat. Forest is lost through the removal of timber and firewood...and through conversion to agriculture, including arable crops and pastureland. Escaped agricultural fires also pose a threat." It has never been common, and is known from only one area in each of Bahia and Rio de Janeiro. It does occur in a few small protected areas. "[M]ore information is needed on the species' natural history and habitat requirements, which could shed light on its decline and influence possible plans for management".
