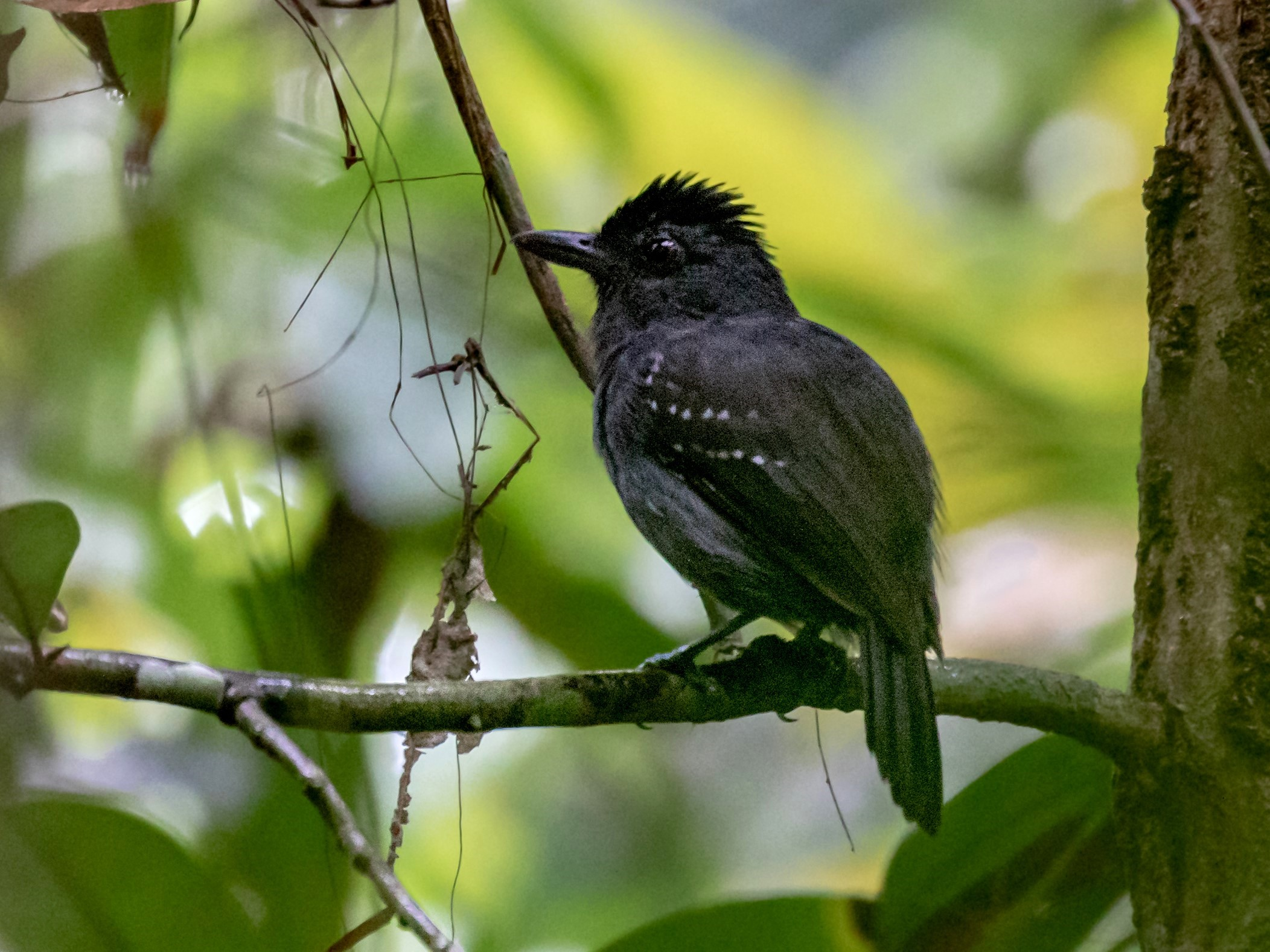
- Male
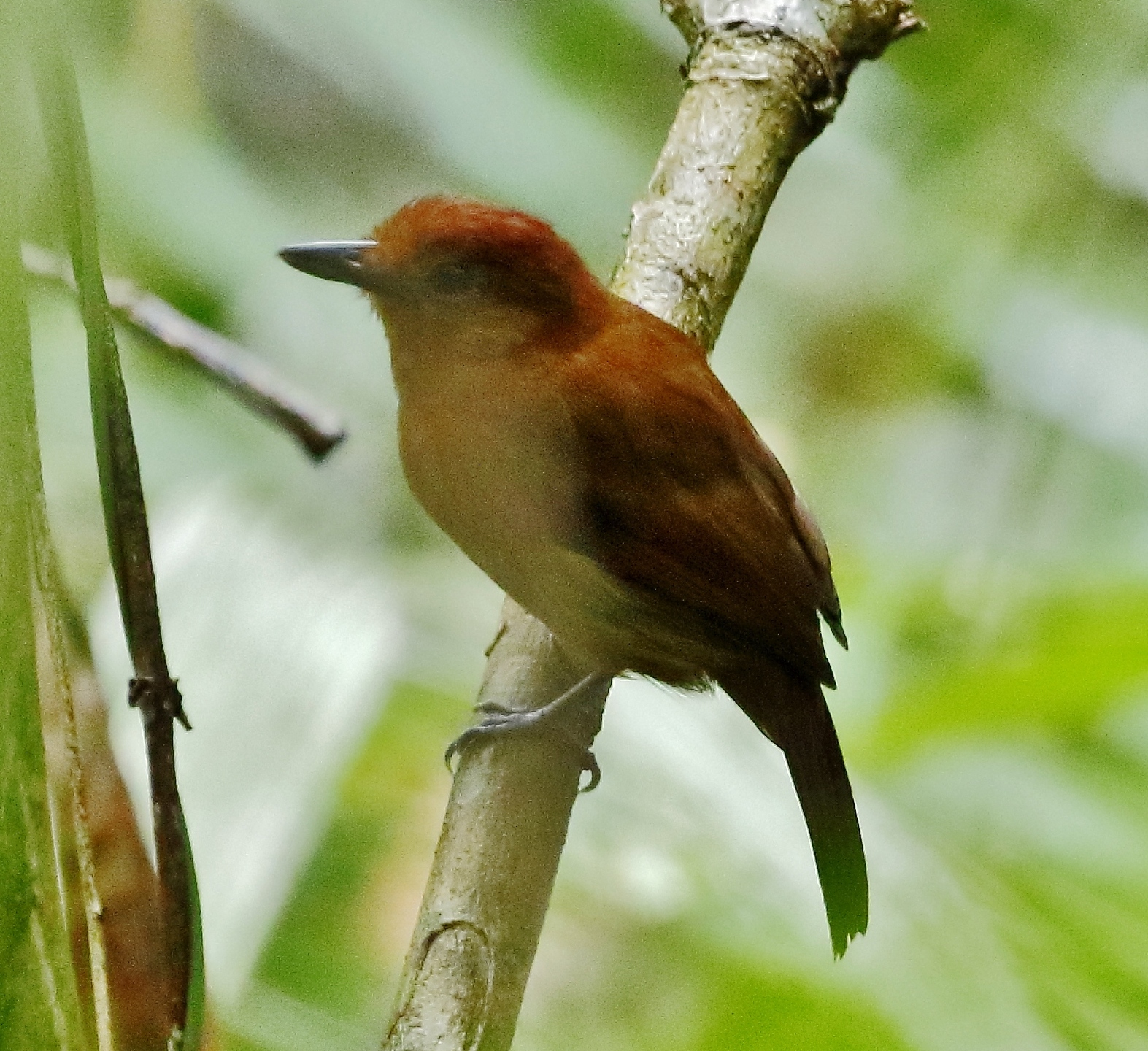
- Female

Conservation status
- Least Concern (IUCN 3.1)

Scientific classification
- Kingdom: Animalia
- Phylum: Chordata
- Class: Aves
- Order: Passeriformes
- Family: Thamnophilidae
- Genus: Thamnophilus
- Species: T. aethiops

Binomial name
- Thamnophilus aethiops Sclater, PL, 1858

= White-shouldered antshrike =

Species of bird

The white-shouldered antshrike (Thamnophilus aethiops) is a species of bird in subfamily Thamnophilinae of family Thamnophilidae, the "typical antbirds". It is found in Bolivia, Brazil, Colombia, Ecuador, Peru, and Venezuela.

== Taxonomy and systematics ==
The white-shouldered antshrike was described by the English zoologist Philip Sclater in 1858 and given the binomial name Thamnophilus aethiops. It, the uniform antshrike (T. unicolor), and the upland antshrike (T. aroyae) form a superspecies or are sister species.

The white-shouldered antshrike has these 10 subspecies:

- T. a. aethiops Sclater, PL, 1858
- T. a. wetmorei Meyer de Schauensee, 1945
- T. a. polionotus Pelzeln, 1868
- T. a. kapouni Seilern, 1913
- T. a. juruanus Ihering, HFA, 1905
- T. a. injunctus Zimmer, JT, 1933
- T. a. punctuliger Pelzeln, 1868
- T. a. atriceps Todd, 1927
- T. a. incertus Pelzeln, 1868
- T. a. distans Pinto, 1954

Several of the subspecies are separated by rivers in the Amazon Basin and authors have suggested that they might represent individual species.

== Description ==
The white-shouldered antshrike is 15 to 17 cm (5.9 to 6.7 in) long and weighs 23 to 30 g (0.81 to 1.1 oz). Members of genus Thamnophilus are largish members of the antbird family; all have stout bills with a hook like those of true shrikes. This species exhibits significant sexual dimorphism. Adult males of the nominate subspecies T. a. aethiops are mostly black. They have a few white spots on their wing's lesser coverts and the bend of the wing, white underwing coverts, and a blackish gray lower belly and crissum. Adult females are entirely deep reddish brown. Subadult males resemble adult females but with pale spots on their wing coverts.

The other subspecies of the white-shouldered antshrike differ from the nominate and each other thus:

- T. a. wetmorei: males have blackish gray upperparts, small white spots on greater and median wing coverts, and gray underparts
- T. a. polionotus: males have slightly less blackish upperparts than wetmorei and small white spots on their outer tail feathers; females have a rufous crown, yellowish red-brown upperparts, and reddish yellow-brown underparts
- T. a. kapouni: males are slightly darker than polionotus with white spots only on their median and lesser coverts, and a slightly darker breast than belly
- T. a. juruanus: males have lighter upperparts than kapouni
- T. a. injunctus: males have darker upperparts than juruanus with white spots on all three types of wing coverts
- T. a. punctuliger: both sexes have pale spots on their wing coverts; males have a slightly paler back than injunctus, a white patch between their scapulars, and small white tips on their outer tail feathers
- T. a. atriceps: males' breast is darker than their belly, and only their greater coverts have white spots
- T. a. incertus: palest of all subspecies; males have a gray crown, no spots on their coverts, and light gray underparts; females are mostly pale rufous with a white belly
- T. a. distans: males are darker than incertus, with white spots on the median and greater coverts

== Distribution and habitat ==
The subspecies of the white-shouldered antshrike are found thus:

- T. a. aethiops: eastern Ecuador and eastern Peru north of the Marañón River
- T. a. wetmorei: Colombia from eastern Cauca Department to Vichada and from that line to the southeast
- T. a. polionotus: eastern Guainía and Vaupés departments of far eastern Colombia, Amazonas and southeastern Bolívar states in southern Venezuela, and in Brazil Roraima state adjacent to Venezuela and the upper drainage and lower right bank of the Negro River to the Solimões (upper Amazon)
- T. a. kapouni: eastern Peru south of the Marañón and Amazon rivers, extreme western Brazil east to the Juruá River, and northern Bolivia as far south as Cochabamba Department
- T. a. juruanus: southwestern Amazonian Brazil between the Juruá and Purus rivers
- T. a. injunctus: Amazonian Brazil between the Purus and Madeira rivers
- T. a. punctuliger: northeastern Santa Cruz Department in extreme northeastern Bolivia and Amazonian Brazil between the Madeira and Tapajós rivers south to Rondônia and northwestern Mato Grosso
- T. a. atriceps: Amazonian Brazil between the Tapajós and Tocantins rivers in southern Pará and northeastern Mato Grosso
- T. a. incertus: Amazonian Brazil south of the Amazon and east of the Tocantins in Pará and northwestern Maranhão
- T. a. distans: separately from the other subspecies in coastal northeastern Brazil's Pernambuco and Alagoas

The white-shouldered antshrike mostly inhabits evergreen forest, occurring mostly in its heavily vegetated understorey. In Colombia, Ecuador, and Peru it is found in the Andean foothills and lower elevation terra firme. In elevation it ranges up to 800 m (2,600 ft) in Colombia, 1,000 m (3,300 ft) in Ecuador, and 1,500 m (4,900 ft) in Peru. In Venezuela and Amazonian Brazil it mostly occurs at the forests' edges along watercourses and in overgrown gaps such as those made by fallen trees. In Mato Grosso it often is associated with stands of Guadua bamboo within terra firme and transitional forest. In Venezuela, it occurs below 400 m (1,300 ft) and in Brazil as high as 900 m (3,000 ft).

== Behavior ==
=== Movement ===
The white-shouldered antshrike is presumed to be a year-round resident throughout its range.

=== Feeding ===
The white-shouldered antshrike's diet is not known in detail but includes insects and other arthropods. It usually forages singly or in pairs and almost entirely in dense vegetation. In general it seldom joins mixed-species feeding flocks, though the nominate subspecies does so somewhat more often in Ecuador and Peru. It usually forages between 1 and 5 m (3 and 16 ft) of the ground but does feed as high as 8 m (26 ft) in bamboo stands. It forages while hopping among branches, commonly reaching or making short jumps from a perch to glean prey from leaves, stems, vines, and branches. It occasionally makes short flights to glean or to forage among leaf litter on the ground. There is single record of a pair in Brazil following an army ant swarm through the understorey.

=== Breeding ===
The white-shouldered antshrike's breeding season has not been fully defined but appears to vary geographically. In different areas breeding activity has been observed in February, July, September, October, and November. Its nest is a deep cup tightly woven from grass and fine roots and sometimes covered on its outside with green moss and rotting leaves. It is typically suspended in a branch fork within about 2.5 m (8 ft) of the ground. The clutch size is two eggs; both sexes incubate the clutch and provision nestlings. The incubation period, time to fledging, and other details of parental care are not known.

=== Vocalization ===
The male white-shouldered antshrike's song is "a short and slowly paced...series of low-pitched, complaining notes delivered at steady pace and even pitch and intensity"; female song is similar but higher-pitched. It has been written as "anh...anh...anh...anh...anh" given at about one note per second. It has been likened to the vocalization of a barred forest falcon (Micrastur ruficollis) or a trogon. Its most common call is an "abrupt throaty 'cuck' " that is often repeated for long periods. Other calls are "caws (sometimes long and downslurred), nasal twangs, long and short growls, and single notes". The songs might differ somewhat among the subspecies but have not been thoroughly investigated.

== Status ==
The IUCN has assessed the white-shouldered antshrike as being of Least Concern. It has an extremely large range; its population size is not known and is believed to be decreasing. No immediate threats have been identified. It is considered uncommon in most of its range, but occurs in many protected areas including indigenous reserved zones. The exception is subspecies T. a. distans, which "appears to be highly threatened owing to the almost complete destruction of lowland evergreen forest in Alagoas and Pernambuco, in the wake of a burgeoning sugar-cane industry".
