= Serra do Acari =

Mountain range in Brazil and Guyana

Coordinates: 1°45′N 57°30′W

The Serra do Acari or Acari Mountains are a mountain range in the border of Brazil and Guyana. The range runs through the north side of the Brazilian city of Oriximiná, Pará, and the south side of East Berbice-Corentyne region in Guyana. The highest point of Pará is located there, at 906 meters (2,972 feet).
