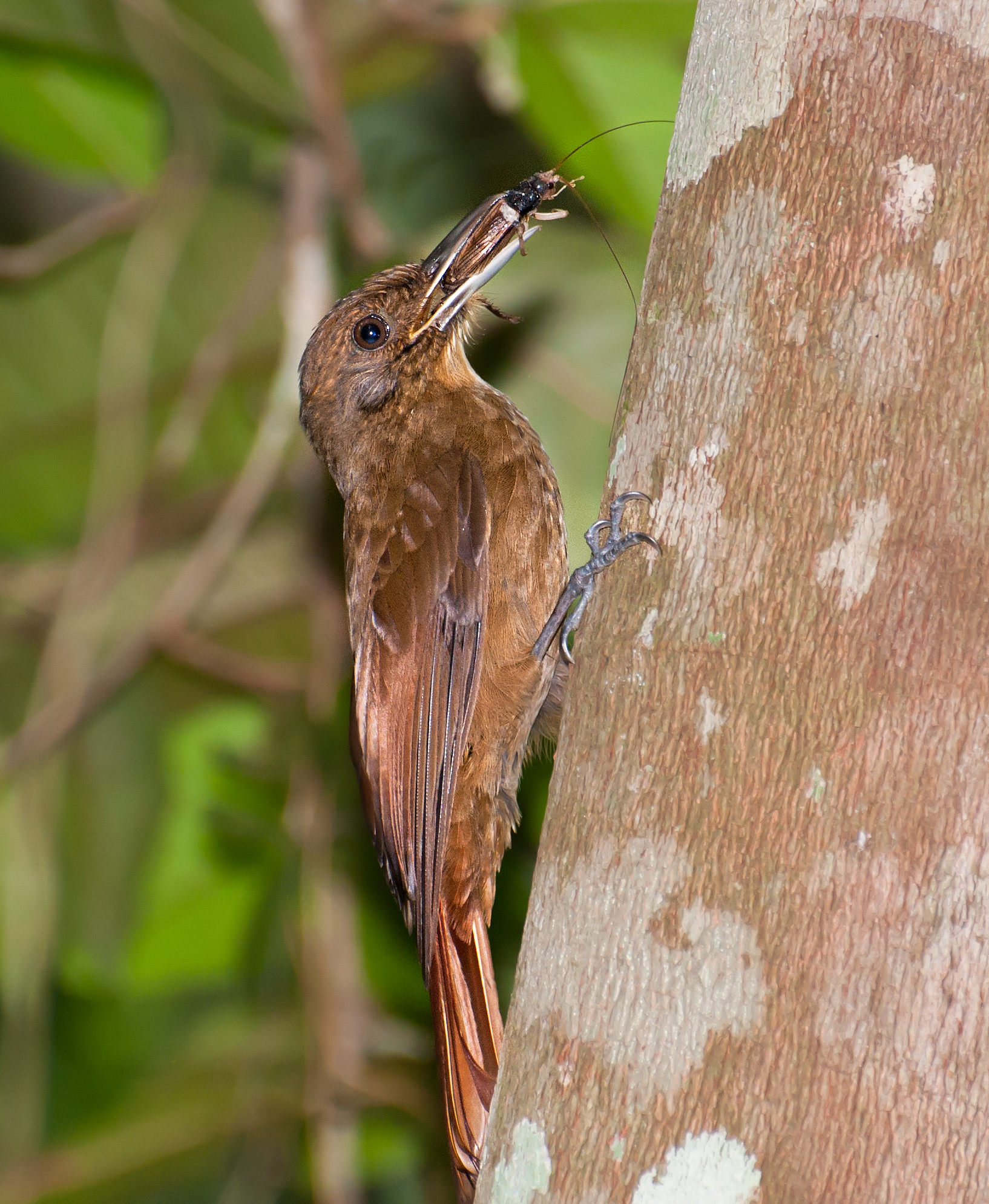
- at Vale do Ribeira, Registro, São Paulo State, Brazil

Conservation status
- Least Concern (IUCN 3.1)

Scientific classification
- Kingdom: Animalia
- Phylum: Chordata
- Class: Aves
- Order: Passeriformes
- Family: Furnariidae
- Genus: Dendrocincla
- Species: D. turdina

Binomial name
- Dendrocincla turdina (Lichtenstein, MHC, 1820)
- Range of D. t. turdina (See Taxonomy section)

Synonyms
- Dendrocincla fuliginosa turdina

= Plain-winged woodcreeper =

Species of bird

The plain-winged woodcreeper or thrush-like woodcreeper (Dendrocincla turdina) is a sub-oscine passerine bird in subfamily Dendrocolaptinae of the ovenbird family Furnariidae. It is found in Argentina, Brazil, and Paraguay.

== Taxonomy and systematics ==
The plain-winged woodcreeper's taxonomy is unsettled. The International Ornithological Committee (IOC) and the Clements taxonomy assign it two subspecies, the nominate D. t. turdina (Lichtenstein, MHC, 1820) and D. t. taunayi (Pinto, 1939). BirdLife International's Handbook of the Birds of the World (HBW) treats it as monotypic and treats subspecies taunayi as a subspecies of the plain-brown woodcreeper (D. fuliginosa). Previously both subspecies were widely considered subspecies of the plain-brown woodcreeper.

This article follows the two-subspecies model.

== Description ==
The plain-winged woodcreeper is 19 to 21 cm (7.5 to 8.3 in) long and weighs 23 to 45 g (0.81 to 1.6 oz). The species is a medium-sized member of its genus, with a short straight bill. The sexes have the same plumage but females are significantly smaller than males. The nominate subspecies is mostly olive-brown. Its crown has faint buff streaks, its throat is pale buff, and its flight feathers, uppertail coverts, and most tail feathers are slightly rufescent. Its wing linings are ochraceous buff. Its iris is brown, its bill gray to blackish with often a paler mandible, and its legs and feet brown to gray. Subspecies D. t. taunayi has more prominent streaks on its crown but is otherwise like the nominate.

== Distribution and habitat ==
The nominate subspecies of the plain-winged woodcreeper is found from Brazil's Bahia state south into northern Rio Grande do Sul and slightly into eastern Paraguay and northeastern Argentina's Misiones Province. Subspecies D. t. taunayi has a very limited range in northeastern Brazil's Alagoas and Pernambuco states. (Note that the map does not include this subspecies' range.) The species primarily inhabits humid lowland primary and mature secondary forest. It also occurs in foothill cloudforest and, in the cerrado, gallery forest. It favors the forest interior but also occurs at its edges. In elevation it reaches 1,250 m (4,100 ft) but is mostly found lower.

== Behavior ==
=== Movement ===
The plain-winged woodcreeper is a year-round resident in most of its range. There are few records in Rio Grande do Sul and Argentina during the austral winter, which suggests that the southernmost subpopulation is migratory.

=== Feeding ===
The plain-winged woodcreeper often follows swarms of army ants such as Eciton burchelli and Labidus praedator to capture prey disturbed by the ants. It often does so as part of a mixed-species feeding flock. Away from army ants, it also joins flocks led by the cinereous antshrike (Thamnomanes caesius). When attending ants it typically perches on a nearly vertical trunk up to about 3 m (10 ft) above the ground and sallies to pick prey from the ground, other trunks, foliage, and in mid-air. In a study in Paraguay and Argentina it often followed black capuchin monkeys (Sapajus nigritus) and other studies have seen it following coatis. Its diet is mostly arthropods but it has also been observed feeding bats and frogs to nestlings.

=== Breeding ===
The plain-winged woodcreeper's nesting season is not well defined but appears to include at least September to January. It nests on a bed of wood chips in a tree cavity. The clutch size is two eggs. The female alone incubates the eggs and cares for the nestlings. The incubation period is not known; fledging occurs about 27 days after hatch.

=== Vocalization ===
The song of the plain-winged woodcreeper's nominate subspecies is a "series...of very high 'keepkeepkeep---' notes, slightly undulating, fading, and crescendoing at random" that may last a minute or more. Subspecies D. t. taunayi's song is "an extended series at much slower tempo, beginning quietly with harsh 'weck' notes, soon increasing in volume and with notes changing to 'wheep', before eventually trailing off". The species' calls include a " 'cha-a-a-a' rattle, 'chahh' hiss, and 'stauf' ".

== Status ==
The IUCN follows HBW taxonomy and so has not included subspecies D. t. taunayi in its evaluation of the plain-winged woodcreeper. It has assessed D. t. turdina as being of Least Concern, though its population size is not known and is believed to be decreasing. It "is considered highly sensitive to habitat fragmentation and human disturbance in at least parts of its range, and is likely to have suffered declines owing to deforestation". It "remains fairly common to common in extensive tracts that still exist in [the] Brazilian part of [its] range." Subspecies D. t. taunayi "can be fairly common in what little forest remains within its limited range." It is rare to uncommon in Argentina, Paraguay, and Rio Grande do Sul.
