= Marabunta (disambiguation) =

Marabunta is one of the names given to army ants.

Marabunta may also refer to any of the following:

== Animals ==
- Cheliomyrmex, an army ant
- Marabunta (wasp), a colloquial name for large stinging wasps in South America

== Films and TV ==
- Marabunta (film), a 1998 horror movie
- "Marabounta", an episode of Code Lyoko
- Marabunta, the army ants in the 1954 movie The Naked Jungle
