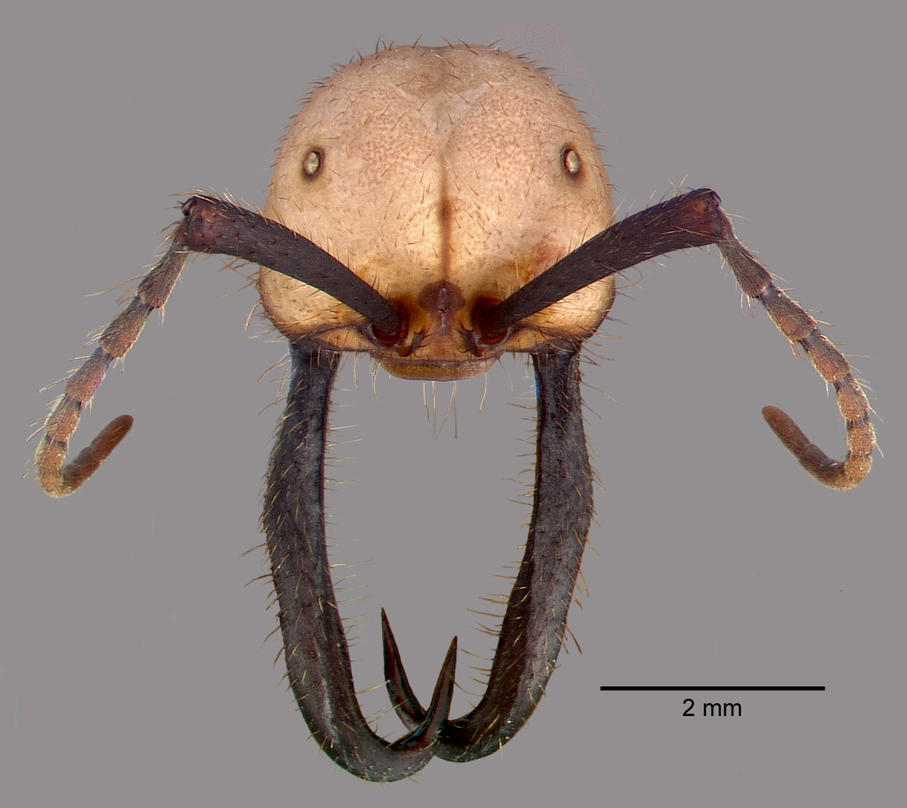
- Eciton burchellii

Scientific classification
- Kingdom: Animalia
- Phylum: Arthropoda
- Class: Insecta
- Order: Hymenoptera
- Family: Formicidae
- Subfamily: Ecitoninae

Tribes and genera
- See text

= Ecitoninae =

Subfamily of ants

Ecitoninae is an ant subfamily.

They are carnivorous ants that are characterized by organizing periodic expeditions of thousands of individuals. They do not build colonies and have a nomadic lifestyle. Some birds regularly follow these expeditions in order to find insects and other small animals that try to escape the attack of ants.

== Distribution ==
They are found in America, from the southern United States to northern Argentina.

== Ecology ==
This group of ants (with Aenictinae and Dorylinae subfamilies) they represent the nomadic ants that do not build anthills, and constantly go from one camp to another, at the same time carrying with them all the food for the larvae, which consists of prey of the invertebrates they attack.

== Tribes and genera ==
It contains 156 species in 5 genera.

- Tribe Cheliomyrmecini
  - Cheliomyrmex - 4 spp.
- Tribe Ecitonini
  - Eciton - 10 spp.
  - Labidus - 10 spp.
  - Neivamyrmex - 130 spp.
  - Nomamyrmex - 2 spp.
