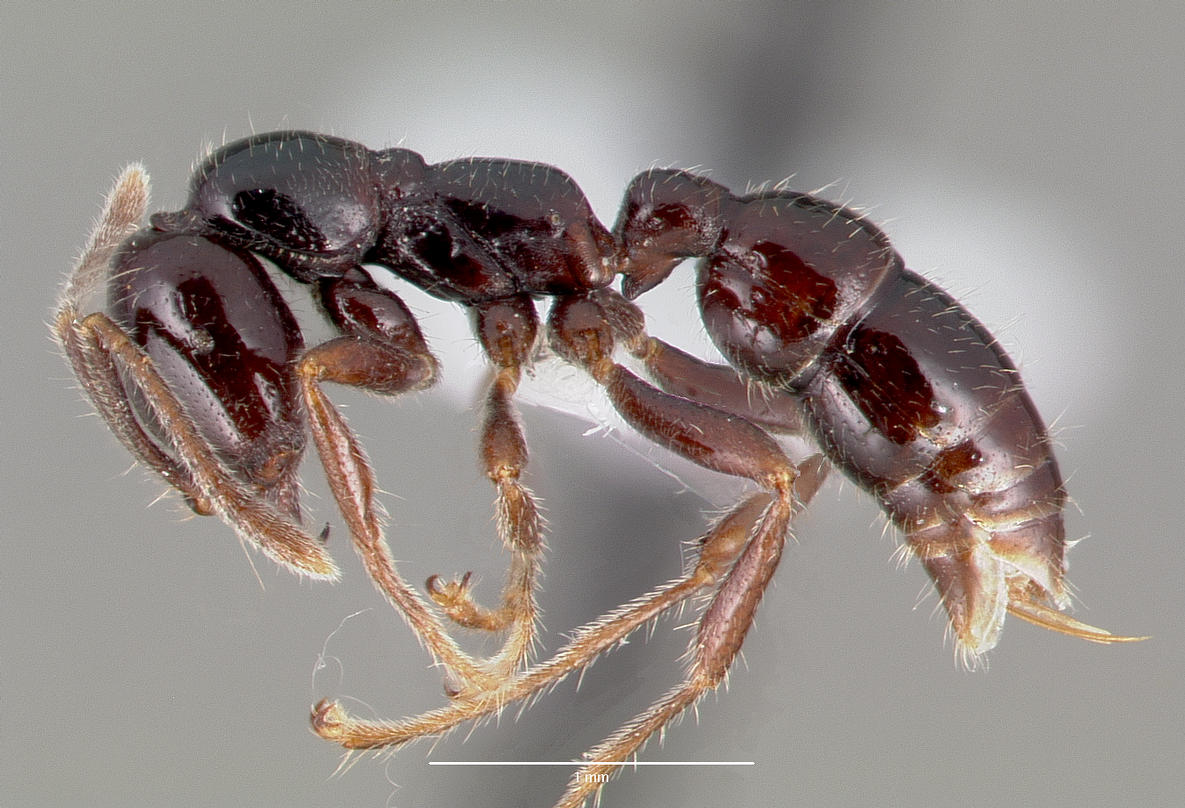
- Worker specimen

Scientific classification
- Kingdom: Animalia
- Phylum: Arthropoda
- Class: Insecta
- Order: Hymenoptera
- Family: Formicidae
- Genus: Onychomyrmex
- Species: O. hedleyi

Binomial name
- Onychomyrmex hedleyi Emery, 1895

= Onychomyrmex hedleyi =

Species of ant

Onychomyrmex hedleyi is a species of ant in the genus Onychomyrmex, which is endemic to Australia. Described by Emery in 1895, the ant is known to have similar behaviours to Army ants.
