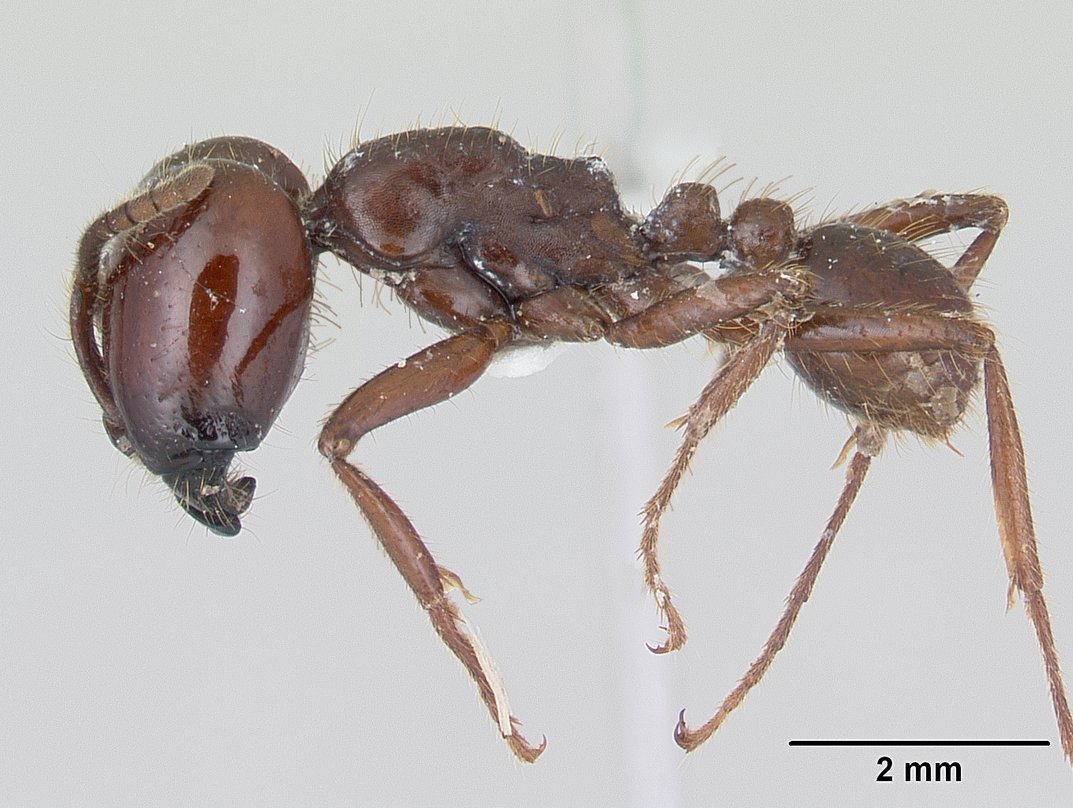

Scientific classification
- Kingdom: Animalia
- Phylum: Arthropoda
- Class: Insecta
- Order: Hymenoptera
- Family: Formicidae
- Genus: Labidus
- Species: L. coecus

Binomial name
- Labidus coecus (Latreille, 1802)

= Labidus coecus =

Species of ant

Labidus coecus is a species of army ant in the family Formicidae found in Central and South America. It has been witnessed predating upon Podocnemis turtles.
