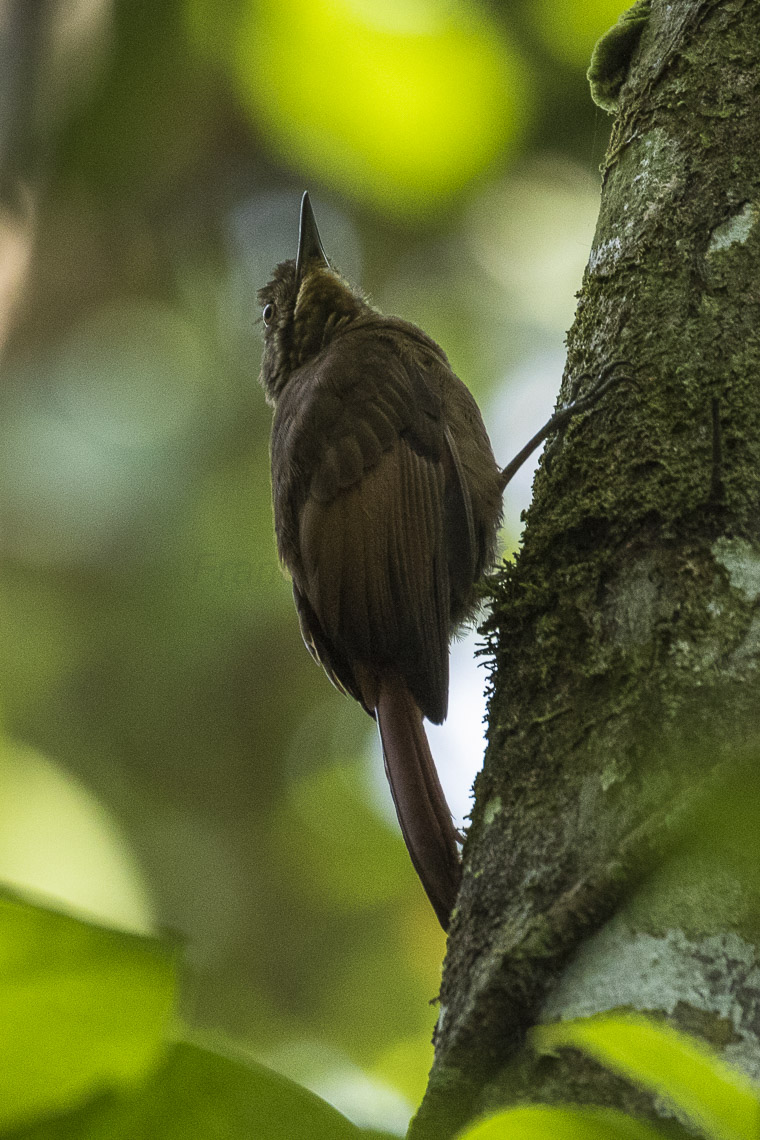

Conservation status
- Least Concern (IUCN 3.1)

Scientific classification
- Kingdom: Animalia
- Phylum: Chordata
- Class: Aves
- Order: Passeriformes
- Family: Furnariidae
- Genus: Dendrocincla
- Species: D. anabatina

Binomial name
- Dendrocincla anabatina Sclater, PL, 1859

= Tawny-winged woodcreeper =

Species of bird

The tawny-winged woodcreeper (Dendrocincla anabatina) is a passerine bird in subfamily Dendrocolaptinae of the ovenbird family Furnariidae. It is found in Belize, Costa Rica, Guatemala, Honduras, Mexico, Nicaragua, and Panama.

== Taxonomy and systematics ==
The tawny-winged woodcreeper has three subspecies, the nominate D. a. anabatina (Sclater, PL, 1859), D. a. typhla (Oberholser, 1904), and D. a. saturata (Carriker, 1910).

Some authors have merged saturata with the nominate but this treatment has not been widely accepted.

== Description ==
The tawny-winged woodcreeper is 17 to 19 cm (6.7 to 7.5 in) long. Males of the nominate subspecies weigh 34 to 42 g (1.2 to 1.5 oz) and females 29 to 39 g (1.0 to 1.4 oz). The species is a medium-sized member of its genus, with a straight bill, a short tail, and a ruffled nape. The sexes have the same plumage. Adults of the nominate subspecies have a brown head with buffy supercilium and bare gray skin around the eye. Their crown, nape, and back are dark olive-brown and their uppertail coverts and tail are cinnamon-rufous to rufous-chestnut. Their wing coverts are dark olive-brown and their flight feathers tawny with dusky tips. Their throat is pale buff and their underparts light olive-brown that becomes cinnamon on the belly and undertail coverts. Their iris is yellowish brown to gray, their maxilla dark brown or black, their mandible gray or bluish, and their legs and feet dark blue-gray to blackish. Juveniles are similar to adults but with a duller throat, a wider supercilium, and sometimes a white eye. Subspecies D. a. typhla is paler than the nominate, especially on its underparts. D. a. saturata has darker and more olivaceous upperparts than the nominate and the centers of its flight feathers are duller.

== Distribution and habitat ==
The nominate subspecies of the tawny-winged woodcreeper is found along the Caribbean slope from southeastern Veracruz in southern Mexico (except the Yucatán Peninsula) south through Belize, Guatemala, and Honduras to eastern Nicaragua. D. a. typhla is found on the Yucatán Peninsula. D. a. saturata is found on the Pacific slope from Costa Rica's Gulf of Nicoya into Panama's Chiriquí Province.

The tawny-winged woodcreeper primarily inhabits mature humid evergreen primary and secondary forest and to a lesser extent the forest edges and nearby semi-open landscapes. On the Yucatán Peninsula it also occurs in semi-deciduous forest and, in Costa Rica, mangroves. It tends to stay low to the ground. In elevation it mostly occurs below 500 m (1,600 ft) but ranges as high as 1,200 m (3,900 ft) in Mexico and northern Central America and to 1,500 m (4,900 ft) in Costa Rica.

== Behavior ==
=== Movement ===
The tawny-winged woodcreeper is a year-round resident throughout its range.

=== Feeding ===
The tawny-winged woodcreeper is a near-obligate follower of army ant swarms but occasionally forages away from them following troops of squirrel monkeys. It typically clings to a branch or trunk up to 3 m (10 ft) above the ground and makes short flights to the ground to capture a wide variety of arthropod prey disturbed by the ants. It also takes small vertebrate prey such as lizards and occasionally feeds on fruit. It does not feed on the army ants themselves. It usually forages singly or in twos and is highly aggressive to other species and its own.

=== Breeding ===
The tawny-winged woodcreeper's breeding season varies somewhat geographically but falls between March and July. It nests in cavities in a stump or a tree or palm trunk; most cavities are natural but some are old woodpecker holes. The cavity is floored with mosses and soft fibers. The clutch size is two eggs. The incubation period is 20 to 21 days and fledging occurs about 24 days after hatch. It appears that only the female builds the nest, incubates the eggs, and provisions the nestlings.

=== Vocalization ===
The tawny-winged woodcreeper makes a long rattle song described as "whee-whee-whee-whee..." that may last more than a minute. Its calls include "a plaintive 'squirp', 'deyeew', 'cheeuw', and 'tchee-u'." Another rendition of a call is "an emphatic TEAURRR!".

== Status ==
The IUCN has assessed the tawny-winged woodcreeper as being of Least Concern. It has a large range and a population estimated at between 50,000 and 500,000 mature individuals. The latter is believed to be decreasing. No immediate threats have been identified. It is generally considered to be fairly common to common except on the Yucatán Peninsula, where it is rare. Though most woodcreepers are very sensitive to forest disturbance there is some evidence that this species tolerates it to some degree.
