= Biotic =

Biotics describe living or once living components of a community; for example organisms, such as animals and plants.

Biotic may refer to:

- Life, the condition of living organisms
- Biology, the study of life
- Biotic material, which is derived from living organisms
- Biotic components in ecology
- Biotic potential, an organism's reproductive capacity
- Biotic community, all the interacting organisms living together in a specific habitat
- Biotic energy, a vital force theorized by biochemist Benjamin Moore
- Biotic Baking Brigade, an unofficial group of pie-throwing activists

== See also ==
- Abiotic
- Antibiotics are agents that either kill bacteria or inhibit their growth
- Prebiotic (nutrition) are non-digestible food ingredients that stimulate the growth or activity of bacteria in the digestive system
- Probiotics consist of a live culture of bacteria that inhibit or interfere with colonization by microbial pathogens
- Synbiotics refer to nutritional supplements combining probiotics and prebiotics
