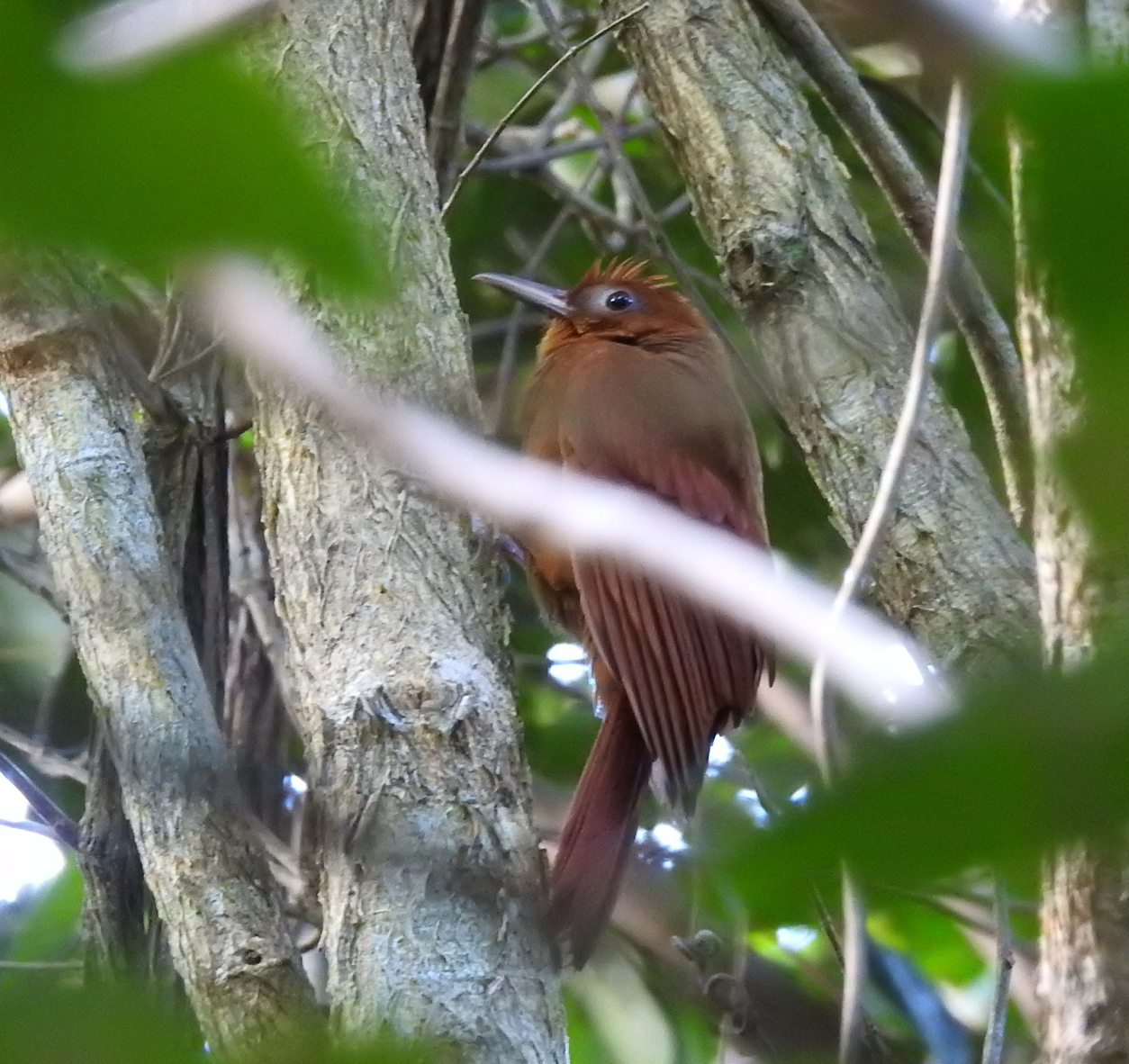

Conservation status
- Least Concern (IUCN 3.1)

Scientific classification
- Kingdom: Animalia
- Phylum: Chordata
- Class: Aves
- Order: Passeriformes
- Family: Furnariidae
- Genus: Dendrocincla
- Species: D. homochroa

Binomial name
- Dendrocincla homochroa (Sclater, PL, 1860)

= Ruddy woodcreeper =

Species of bird

The ruddy woodcreeper (Dendrocincla homochroa) is a passerine bird in subfamily Dendrocolaptinae of the ovenbird family Furnariidae. It is found from southern Mexico to northern Colombia and extreme northern Venezuela.

== Taxonomy and systematics ==
The ruddy woodcreeper has these four subspecies:

- D. h. homochroa (Sclater, PL, 1860)
- D. h. acedesta Oberholser, 1904
- D. h. ruficeps Sclater, PL & Salvin, 1868
- D. h. meridionalis Phelps, WH & Phelps, WH Jr, 1953

Subspecies D. h. acedesta has sometimes been merged into the nominate D. h. homochroa.

== Description ==
The ruddy woodcreeper is 17.5 to 20.5 cm (6.9 to 8.1 in) long. Males weigh 34 to 45 g (1.2 to 1.6 oz) and females 27 to 39 g (0.95 to 1.4 oz). The species is a medium-sized member of its genus, with a straight bill, a short tail, and a large head with a ruffled nape. The sexes have the same plumage. The nominate subspecies has dark rufous to chestnut-brown upperparts with a brighter reddish crown. Its wings, uppertail coverts, and tail are rufous chestnut. The tips of its primaries are dusky. It has grayish lores and eyering and a cinnamon-buff to tawny-ochraceous throat. Its underparts are rufous brown with a paler belly and more rufous undertail coverts. Its underwing coverts are pale rufous. Its iris is reddish brown to pale chestnut-brown and its legs and feet pale grayish to grayish brown. Its bill is highly variable; it can be dusky brownish, grayish, dull pinkish with a blackish tip, or all black.

Subspecies D. h. acedesta is larger, darker, and more olive than the nominate and its throat and belly are not as pale. D. h. ruficeps is slightly larger than acedesta, has a heavier bill, and is slightly paler overall. D. h. meridionalis has a darker chestnut crown and darker and more olive-brown upperparts than the other three subspecies.

== Distribution and habitat ==
The subspecies of the ruddy woodcreeper are found thus:

- D. h. homochroa, both sides of southern Mexico south through Belize, Guatemala, a bit of El Salvador, and Honduras into northeastern Nicaragua
- D. h. acedesta, the Pacific slope from southwestern Nicaragua through Costa Rica into western Panama and also the Caribbean slope of northern and central Costa Rica
- D. h. ruficeps, central and eastern Panama and slightly into northwestern Colombia
- D. h. meridionalis, northern Colombia and northwestern Venezuela

The ruddy woodcreeper inhabits a variety of forest landscapes including lowland deciduous forest, rainforest, cloudforest, and gallery forest. It favors the interior of mature primary and secondary forest but also occurs at their edges, in younger secondary forest, and in semi-open areas with some trees. It is generally a bird of lowlands and foothills. At the northernmost edge of its range it occurs at elevations between 1,300 and 1,550 m (4,300 and 5,100 ft). In northern Central America it occurs as high as 1,650 m (5,400 ft) but is most common between 300 and 1,200 m (1,000 and 3,900 ft). In Costa Rica it mostly occurs between 500 and 1,200 m (1,600 and 3,900 ft) and in Panama between 300 and 900 m (1,000 and 3,000 ft). It is typically below 1,500 m (4,900 ft) in Colombia and below 450 m (1,500 ft) in Venezuela.

== Behavior ==
=== Movement ===
The ruddy woodcreeper is mostly a year-round resident throughout its range. It may wander from higher elevations in Central America and might be somewhat nomadic in northwestern Costa Rica.

=== Feeding ===
The ruddy woodcreeper is a near-obligate follower of army ant swarms but occasionally joins mixed-species feeding flocks away from them. It typically clings to a trunk up to 10 m (33 ft) above the ground and makes short flights to capture arthropod prey disturbed by the ants. It does not feed on the ants themselves. It does occasionally forage in epiphytes. Usually one or two birds attend the ant swarms.

=== Breeding ===
The ruddy woodcreeper's breeding season varies somewhat geographically but falls between March and June. It nests in cavities in a stump or a tree or palm trunk. It adds bark and other fibers to the bottom of the cavity, and first builds up deep ones with moss or leaves. The clutch size is two or three eggs. The incubation period, time to fledging, and details of parental care are not known.

=== Vocalization ===
The ruddy woodcreeper seldom vocalizes. It does make a "rattle, churring or slightly slurred" song and a variety of calls including "churring, a squeaky 'quink' or 'peach', and a nasal, descending 'deeeeah' or 'tee tee eu' ".

== Status ==
The IUCN has assessed the ruddy woodcreeper as being of Least Concern. It has a large range and a population estimated at between 50,000 and 500,000 mature individuals. The latter is believed to be decreasing. No immediate threats have been identified. From Mexico to Costa Rica it is considered uncommon to fairly common and from Costa Rica to Panama only locally common. It appears to be more common in Venezuela than in Colombia. It appears "to be highly sensitive to loss and fragmentation of mature forest; even within suitable habitat numbers seem to fluctuate substantially, this possibly contributing to local extinction at marginal sites."
