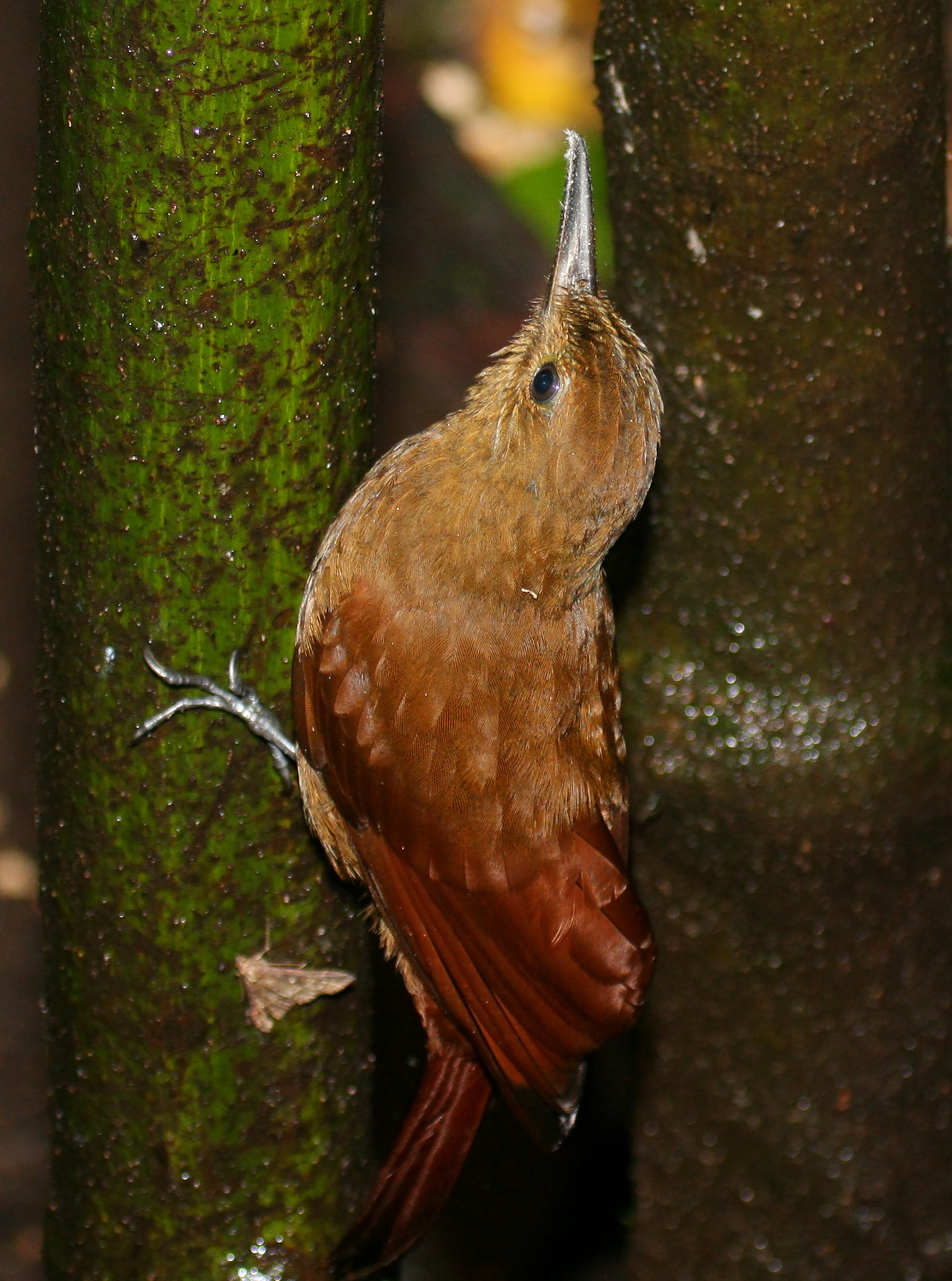
- Tandayapa Valley, NW Ecuador

Conservation status
- Least Concern (IUCN 3.1)

Scientific classification
- Kingdom: Animalia
- Phylum: Chordata
- Class: Aves
- Order: Passeriformes
- Family: Furnariidae
- Genus: Dendrocincla
- Species: D. tyrannina

Binomial name
- Dendrocincla tyrannina (Lafresnaye, 1851)

= Tyrannine woodcreeper =

Species of bird

The tyrannine woodcreeper (Dendrocincla tyrannina) is a species of bird in subfamily Dendrocolaptinae of the ovenbird family Furnariidae. It is found in Bolivia, Colombia, Ecuador, Peru, and Venezuela.

== Taxonomy and systematics ==
The tyrannine woodcreeper has two subspecies, the nominate D. t. tyrannina (Lafresnaye, 1851) and D. t. hellmayri (Cory, 1913).

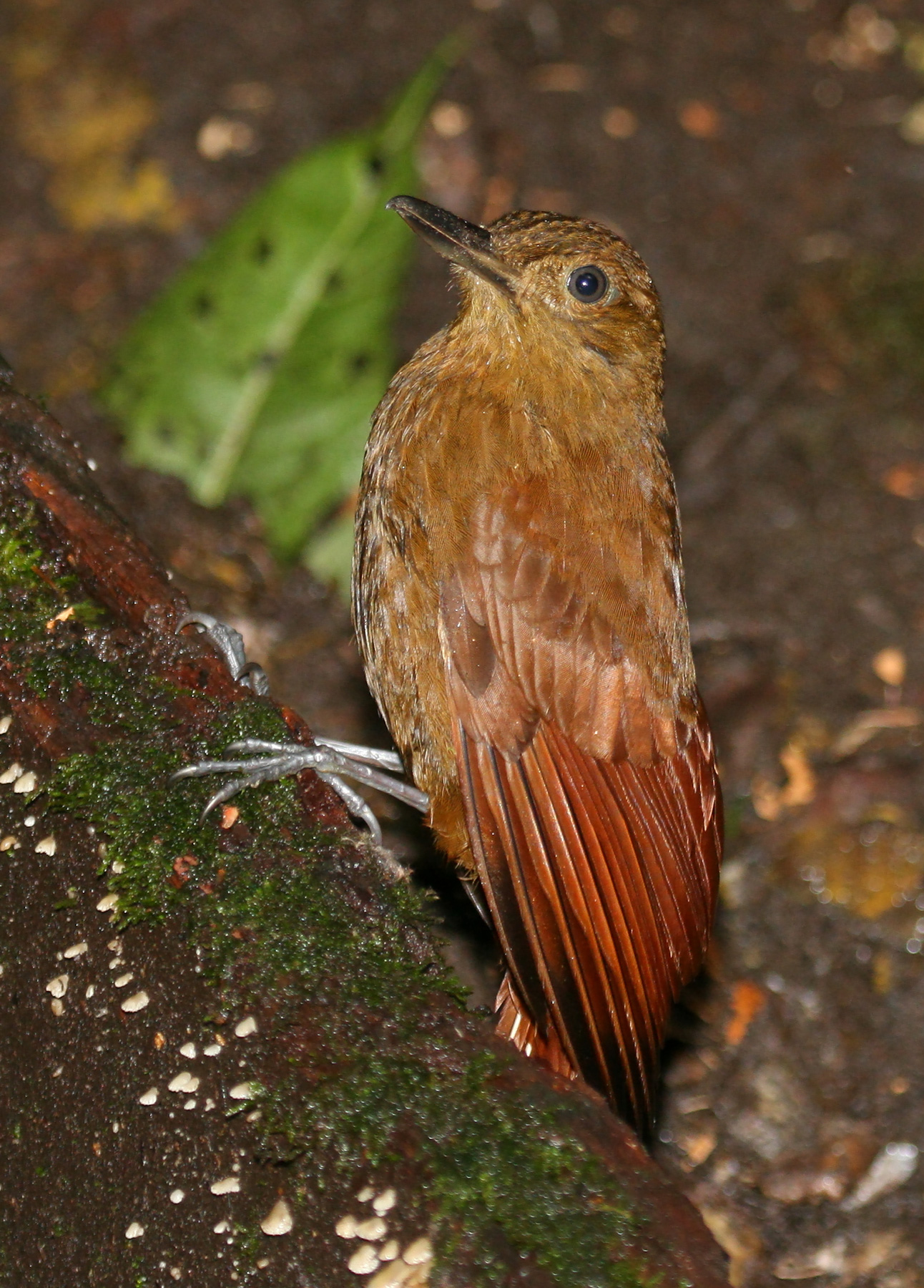
Tandayapa Valley, Ecuador

== Description ==
The tyrannine woodcreeper is rather larger and heavier than most others of its genus. It is 23 to 26.5 cm (9.1 to 10 in) long and weighs 40 to 64 g (1.4 to 2.3 oz). The sexes have the same plumage, though males average heavier than females. The nominate subspecies mostly warm brown, with a paler throat, faint buff streaks on its forecrown and behind the eye, and a rufescent cast to the wings and tail. Subspecies D. t. hellmayri is a more olive-brown than the nominate, and has less rufescent wings and tail. Both subspecies have a brown to bluish gray iris and gray to blackish legs and feet. Their large bill has a brownish gray to black maxilla and a brownish to bluish gray mandible.

== Distribution and habitat ==
The nominate subspecies of the tyrannine woodcreeper is found in Colombia's Western and Central Andes and south on both slopes of the Andes through Ecuador and Peru and slightly into Bolivia. D. t. hellmayri is found on the eastern slope of Colombia's Eastern Andes and in adjacent western Venezuela. The species inhabits humid temperate, subtropical, and tropical montane forest. It favors the interior of primary forest though it also occurs at the edges and in mature secondary forest. It only rarely occurs in clearings. In elevation it ranges between 1,800 and 2,300 m (5,900 and 7,500 ft) in Venezuela. In Colombia it mostly ranges between 1,500 and 3,000 m (4,900 and 9,800 ft) but occurs as low as 720 m (2,400 ft) in the southwest of the country. In Ecuador it ranges between 1,400 and 3,100 m (4,600 and 10,200 ft) but is most common between 1,800 and 2,700 m (5,900 and 8,900 ft). In central Peru it has been documented between 1,310 and 2,225 m (4,300 and 7,300 ft).

== Behavior ==
=== Movement ===
The tyrannine woodcreeper is a year-round resident throughout its range.

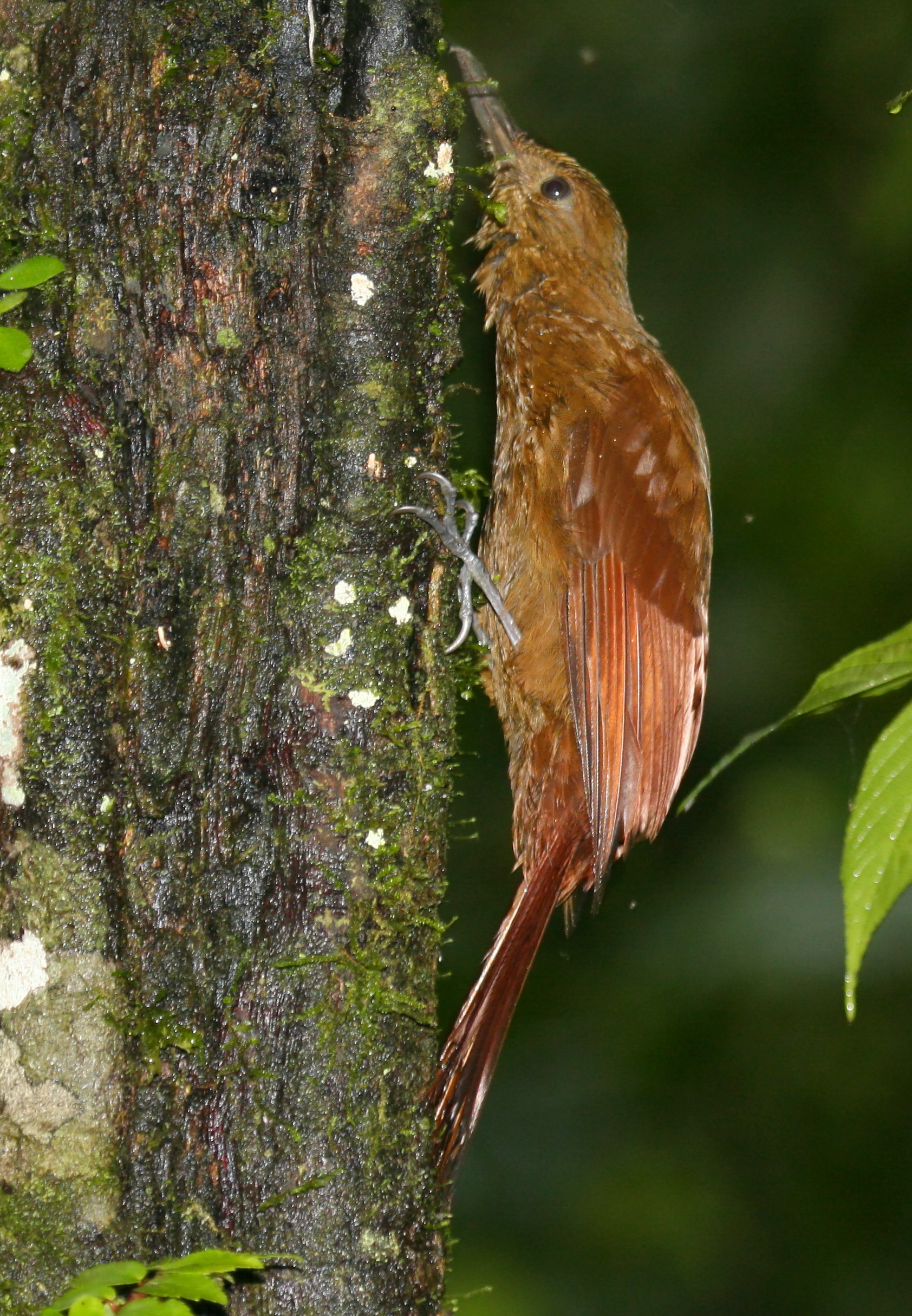
Climbing posture, Tandayapa Valley, Ecuador

=== Feeding ===
The tyrannine woodcreeper's diet has not been detailed but is assumed to be mostly insects. It usually forages singly though it does join mixed-species feeding flocks. It hitches itself up trunks and along branches from which it makes brief sallies to catch prey in the air; it seldom takes prey directly from the substrate. It seldom follows army ant swarms. It typically feeds fairly low in the forest, between 2 and 15 m (7 and 49 ft) above the ground.

=== Breeding ===
Little is known about the tyrannine woodcreeper's breeding biology. It tends to be solitary which suggests that it does not form long-term pair bonds. It nests in a tree cavity with some soft material piled in the bottom; one nest in Ecuador had a single egg. Fledging occurs at least 29 days after hatch. The incubation period and details of parental care are not known.

=== Vocalization ===
The tyrannine woodcreeper typically sings from the subcanopy of a ridgetop tree. Its song is "a long stuttered rattle that gradually increases in pitch and volume before trailing off and slowing toward [the] end". Its call is "a fast phrase of 3-6 sharp abrupt notes, e.g., 'di-di-di-di-dik!' ". It also makes "a hollow, whistled 'que-up'."

== Status ==
The IUCN has assessed they tyrannine woodcreeper as being of Least Concern. It has a large range but its population size is not known and is believed to be decreasing. No immediate threats have been identified. It is rare to uncommon in most of its range and is found only in a narrow elevational belt. It does occur in a few protected areas. It appears to be "highly sensitive to human disturbance in a region where habitat loss is extensive and continuing" and "is a candidate for possible future reconsideration of its status".
