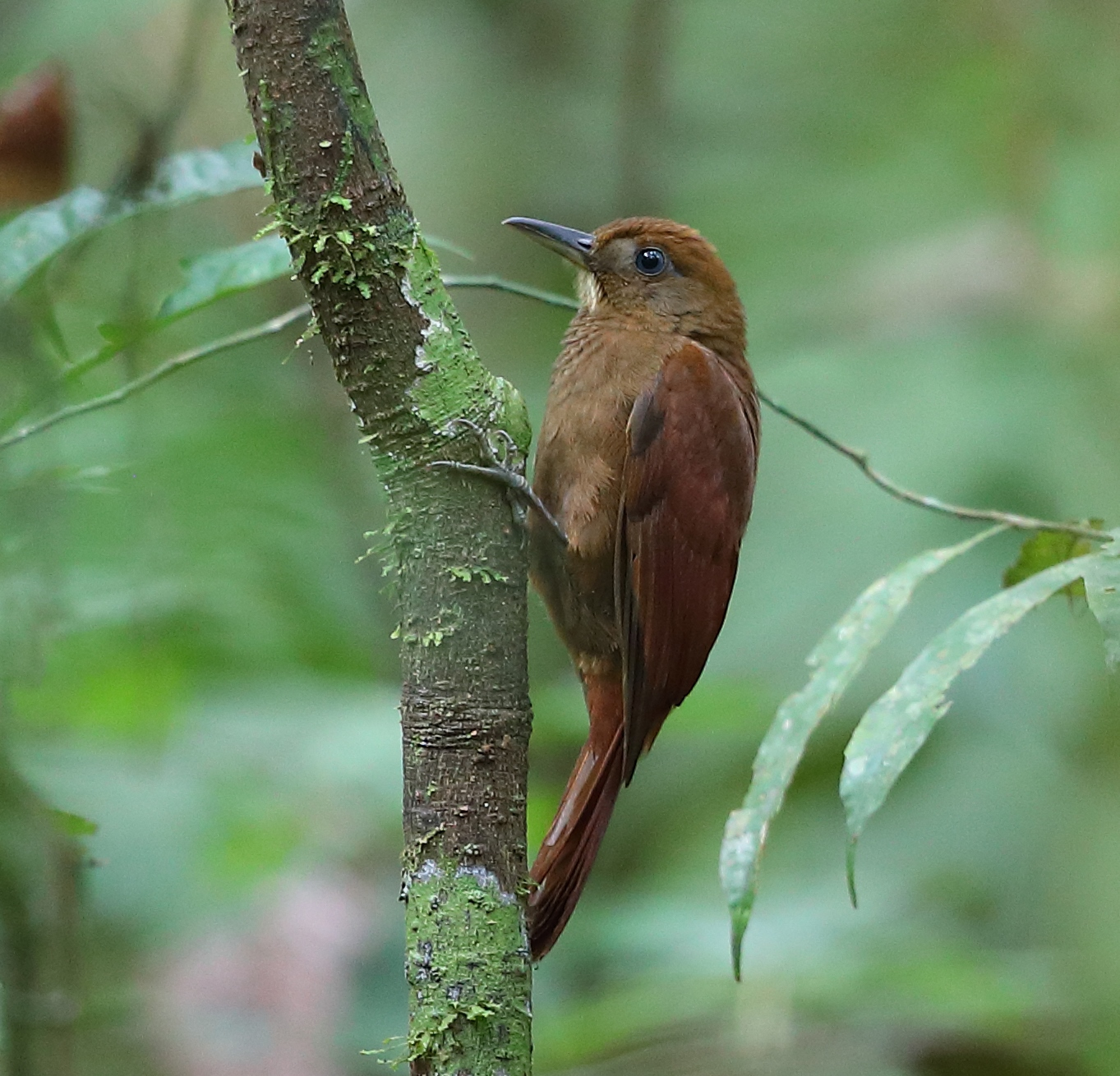

Conservation status
- Least Concern (IUCN 3.1)

Scientific classification
- Kingdom: Animalia
- Phylum: Chordata
- Class: Aves
- Order: Passeriformes
- Family: Furnariidae
- Genus: Dendrocincla
- Species: D. merula

Binomial name
- Dendrocincla merula (Lichtenstein, MHC, 1820)

= White-chinned woodcreeper =

Species of bird

The white-chinned woodcreeper (Dendrocincla merula) is a species of bird in subfamily Dendrocolaptinae of the ovenbird family Furnariidae. It is found in Bolivia, Brazil, Colombia, Ecuador, French Guiana, Guyana, Peru, Suriname, and Venezuela.

== Taxonomy and systematics ==
The white-chinned woodcreeper has these seven subspecies:

- D. m. bartletti Chubb, C, 1919
- D. m. merula (Lichtenstein, MHC, 1820)
- D. m. obidensis Todd, 1948
- D. m. remota Todd, 1925
- D. m. olivascens Zimmer, JT, 1934
- D. m. castanoptera Ridgway, 1888
- D. m. badia Zimmer, JT, 1934

The nominate subspecies D. m. merula and subspecies D. m. obidensis differ in voice and iris color from the other five, suggesting that more than one species are represented. In addition, what is now subspecies meruloides of the plain-brown woodcreeper (D. fuliginosa) was previously treated as a subspecies of the white-chinned.

== Description ==
The white-chinned woodcreeper is a medium-sized member of its genus with a shortish straight bill. It is 16 to 21 cm (6.3 to 8.3 in) long. Males weigh 28 to 54 g (0.99 to 1.9 oz) and females 29 to 54 g (1.0 to 1.9 oz). Subspecies D. m. merula and D. m. obidensis are significantly larger than the other five. In all subspecies the male and female have the same plumage. The nominate subspecies has mostly dark reddish brown upperparts with slightly redder wing coverts, flight feathers, and tail. A few flight feathers have dark brown tips. It has a narrow white to yellowish vertical stripe on its chin and throat. Its breast is dark olive-brown that becomes dark rufous at the undertail coverts. Its underwing coverts are pale chestnut. Its iris is reddish brown to brown, its bill browish to black with a lighter, though variable, mandible, and its legs and feet are bluish, olive, gray, or brownish. D. m. obidensis is the largest subspecies but is otherwise almost identical to the nominate.

The other five subspecies have gray to bluish irises; they also have some plumage color differences and are generally paler overall than the above two. D. m. remota is the palest of all. D. m. olivascens has an olive cast to its upperparts. D. m. castanoptera has somewhat redder upperparts than the nominate. D. m. badia is redder than castanoptera and has a wider, whiter, throat stripe than all the others. D. m. bartletti has dusky tips to most of its flight feathers.

== Distribution and habitat ==
The white-chinned woodcreeper is a bird of the Amazon Basin. Its subspecies are distributed thus:

- D. m. bartletti, from central Colombia and Venezuela south through eastern Ecuador and eastern Peru into northern Bolivia and east into western Brazil to the Rio Negro and Rio Madeira
- D. m. merula, the Guianas and northern Brazil's Roraima and Pará states
- D. m. obidensis, Brazil north of the Amazon River from the Rio Negro east to the Atlantic Ocean
- D. m. remota, eastern Bolivia and probably adjacent far western Brazil
- D. m. olivascens, Brazil south of the Amazon River between the Rio Madeira and Rio Tapajós
- D. m. castanoptera, Brazil south of the Amazon River between the Rio Tapajós and Rio Tocantins
- D. m. badia, Brazil south of the Amazon River between the Rio Tocantins and the Atlantic

The white-chinned woodcreeper inhabits humid landscapes, primarily terra firme and floodplain forests. It occurs in much lesser numbers in forest on sandy soils, gallery forest, young secondary forest, and the edges of várzea forest. It is almost always found in the forest understory. In elevation it is mostly found below 300 m (1,000 ft) but on the western fringes of its ranges can reach 600 m (2,000 ft).

== Behavior ==
=== Movement ===
The white-chinned woodcreeper is a year-round resident throughout its range but does some short-distance local wandering.

=== Feeding ===
The white-chinned woodcreeper is an obligate follower of army ant swarms. It typically perches on a branch or clings to a trunk near the ground and makes short flights to capture arthropod prey disturbed by the ants. It does not feed on the ants themselves. It does occasionally also take small vertebrates as they flee the ants. In much of Brazil one or two birds may attend a swarm but in Peru up to eight have been observed doing so. It chases away smaller birds from the swarm and is in turn chased away by larger ones.

=== Breeding ===
The white-chinned woodcreeper's breeding biology is not well known. Its breeding season does vary geographically, being generally February to May in the north and progressively later to the south. The species does not appear to form long-term pair bonds. It is assumed to nest in tree cavities but no nest has been described. The clutch size, incubation period, time to fledging, and details of parental care are not known.

=== Vocalization ===
Subspecies D. m. merula and D. m. obidensis of the white-chinned woodcreeper sing "a series of 6-9 loud whistled notes...'kew, kew, kew, kew, kew, kewp' ". Their call is a "piercing 'deet-eet-ee' ". The songs of other subspecies have a lower pitch; in Colombia it has been described as "we, wi, di, dit" or "wi-wid-wid-di". Their calls include a "dit-it-it-it" or "tat-at-at".

== Status ==
The IUCN has assessed the white-chinned woodcreeper as being of Least Concern. It has an extremely large range but its population size is not known and is believed to be decreasing. No immediate threats have been identified. It is generally uncommon but can be locally common. "Like other obligate ant-followers, [it is] highly sensitive to fragmentation and disturbance of mature forest, all but disappearing from fragments up to 100 ha [250 acres] in size."
