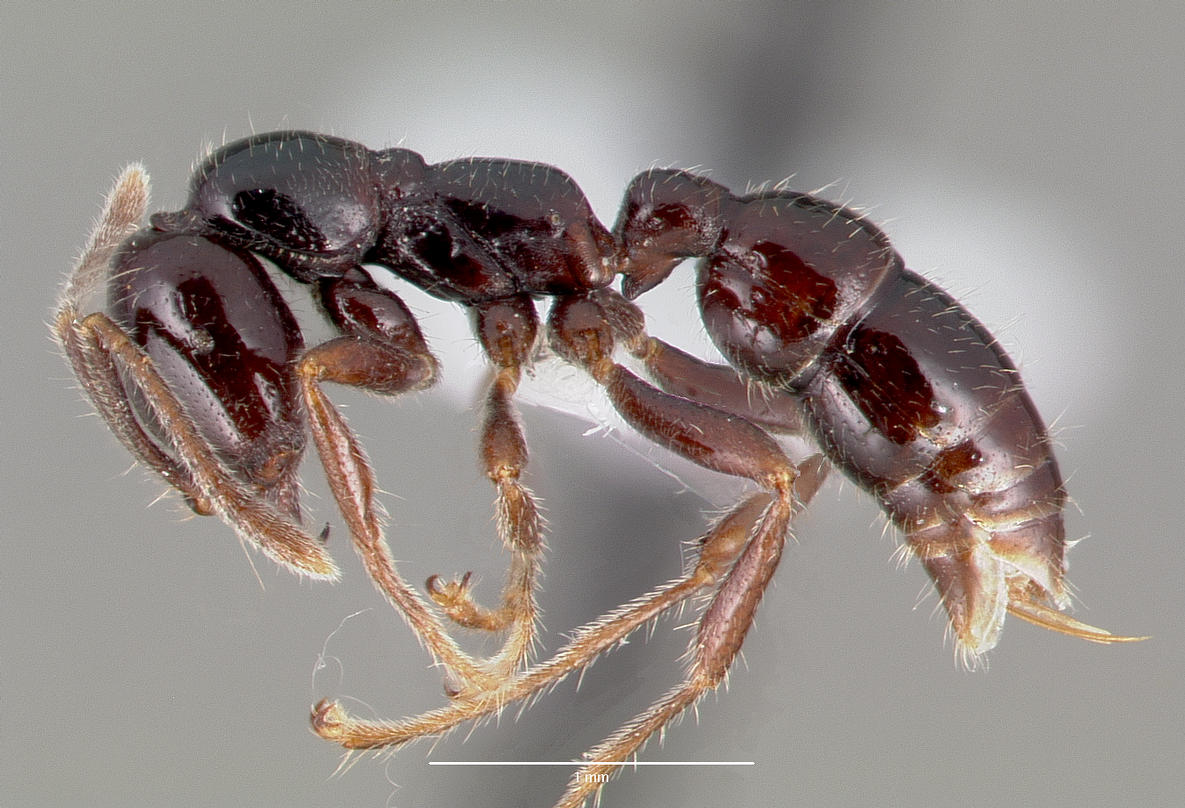
- Onychomyrmex hedleyi worker from Australia

Scientific classification
- Kingdom: Animalia
- Phylum: Arthropoda
- Class: Insecta
- Order: Hymenoptera
- Family: Formicidae
- Subfamily: Amblyoponinae
- Tribe: Amblyoponini
- Genus: Onychomyrmex; Emery, 1895

Type species
- Onychomyrmex hedleyi Emery, 1895

Diversity
- 3 species

= Onychomyrmex =

Genus of ants

Onychomyrmex is an Australian genus of ants in the subfamily Amblyoponinae. Its three species are known from eastern Queensland, Australia. Although not true army ants, Onychomyrmex species display an army-ant life style, including group predation and nomadism.

== Distribution ==
The genus is known from Queensland, Australia, where it is found living mainly in rotten logs in the rainforests along the eastern coast. Their distribution may range into the northeastern New South Wales. The type localities of the three species are: Kuranda (O. doddi), Mount Bellenden Ker (O. hedleyi) and Herberton (O. mjobergi).

== Description ==
Species have an army-ant life style, including group predation and nomadism. Queens are similar to the true army ants (subfamily Dorylinae). That is, Onychomyrmex queens are dichthadiiform, having a broadened head, very small eyes, worker-like alitrunk without wings or sclerites, and an elongated bulky gaster. However, belonging to the tribe Amblyoponini, they are evidently amblyoponines and the army-ant like characters are deemed to have evolved through convergent evolution. Workers are more slender and have longer appendages than Amblyopone.

Workers of O. hedleyi and O. doddi have been reported to forage in small groups en masse, like the true army ants. O. hedleyi are predators of arthropods, mainly centipedes. Larger prey are not dismember at the prey site, instead nestmates are recruited to retrieve the prey in group. When prey too large to carry are encountered, the ants relocate their bivouac (a structure formed by migratory ants, constructed out of the body of living ant workers), up to 150 meters.

== Species ==
- Onychomyrmex doddi Wheeler, 1916
- Onychomyrmex glauerti (Clark, 1928)
- Onychomyrmex hedleyi Emery, 1895
- Onychomyrmex mjobergi Forel, 1915
