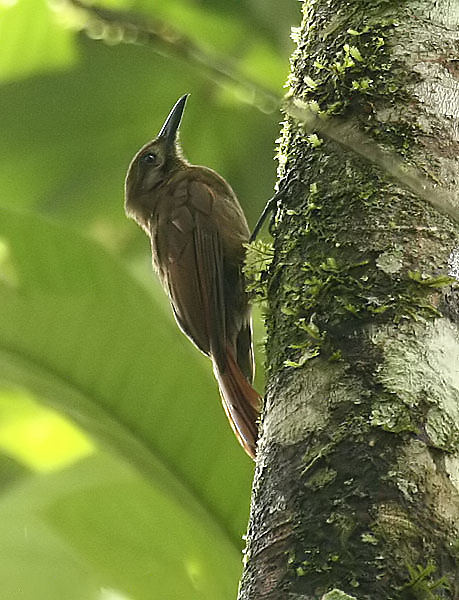
- Plain-brown woodcreeper, (Dendrocincla fuliginosa)

Scientific classification
- Kingdom: Animalia
- Phylum: Chordata
- Class: Aves
- Order: Passeriformes
- Family: Furnariidae
- Subfamily: Dendrocolaptinae
- Genus: Dendrocincla; G.R. Gray, 1840

Type species
- Dendrocolaptes turdina Lichtenstein, 1820

Species
- 6, see text

= Dendrocincla =

Genus of birds

Dendrocincla is a genus of bird in the woodcreeper subfamily Dendrocolaptinae.

== Taxonomy and systematics ==
=== Extant species ===
The genus contains six species:

| Image | Scientific name | Common name | Distribution |
|---|---|---|---|
| | Dendrocincla tyrannina | Tyrannine woodcreeper | Bolivia, Colombia, Ecuador, Peru, and Venezuela. |
| | Dendrocincla fuliginosa | Plain-brown woodcreeper | Honduras through South America to northern Argentina, and in Trinidad and Tobago. |
| | Dendrocincla turdina | Plain-winged woodcreeper | eastern Brazil from Rio Grande do Sul north to Bahia, north-east Argentina (Misiones Province) and eastern Paraguay. |
| | Dendrocincla anabatina | Tawny-winged woodcreeper | Belize, Costa Rica, Guatemala, Honduras, Mexico, Nicaragua, and Panama. |
| | Dendrocincla merula | White-chinned woodcreeper | Bolivia, Brazil, Colombia, Ecuador, French Guiana, Guyana, Peru, Suriname, and Venezuela. |
| | Dendrocincla homochroa | Ruddy woodcreeper | southern Mexico to northern Colombia and extreme northern Venezuela. |

=== Former species ===
Formerly, some authorities also considered the following species (or subspecies) as species within the genus Dendrocincla:

- Sangihe whistler (as Dendrocincla macrorhyncha)
