= Wildlife population =

A wildlife population or species population is the concept of "population" applied to any species other than humans. Understanding a wildlife population requires a census of the species, and the technique for accomplishing that vary depending on the species and circumstance. Characteristics which define a wildlife population include population density, birth rate, mortality rate, age distribution, biotic potential, biological dispersal, and growth form.

Methods for measuring wildlife populations include mark and recapture, distance sampling, and examining a harvest. Biologists who survey wildlife populations often work in a business context where they balance maintaining quality data, but complete the survey quickly, and work at low cost. Economic reasons for doing wildlife surveys can include harvesting wildlife, controlling disease, or negotiating conflicts between multiple business interests who claim control of a resource.

Motivations for studying wildlife populations include wildlife conservation and wildlife management.

Wildlife populations are declining globally at fast rates. The Living Planet Index reported that from 1970-2020, the global populations in freshwater ecosystems have decreased by 85%, Terrestrial animals by 69%, and marine life by 56%. Counting the number of individuals in a population is key to predicting and identifying ecosystem collapse when populations of wildlife will go extinct. Population viability analysis is a method for determining if a population will go extinct in given circumstances.

== See also ==
- Wildlife conservation
- Population ecology
- Habitat fragmentation
- Wildlife management
- Conservation biology
