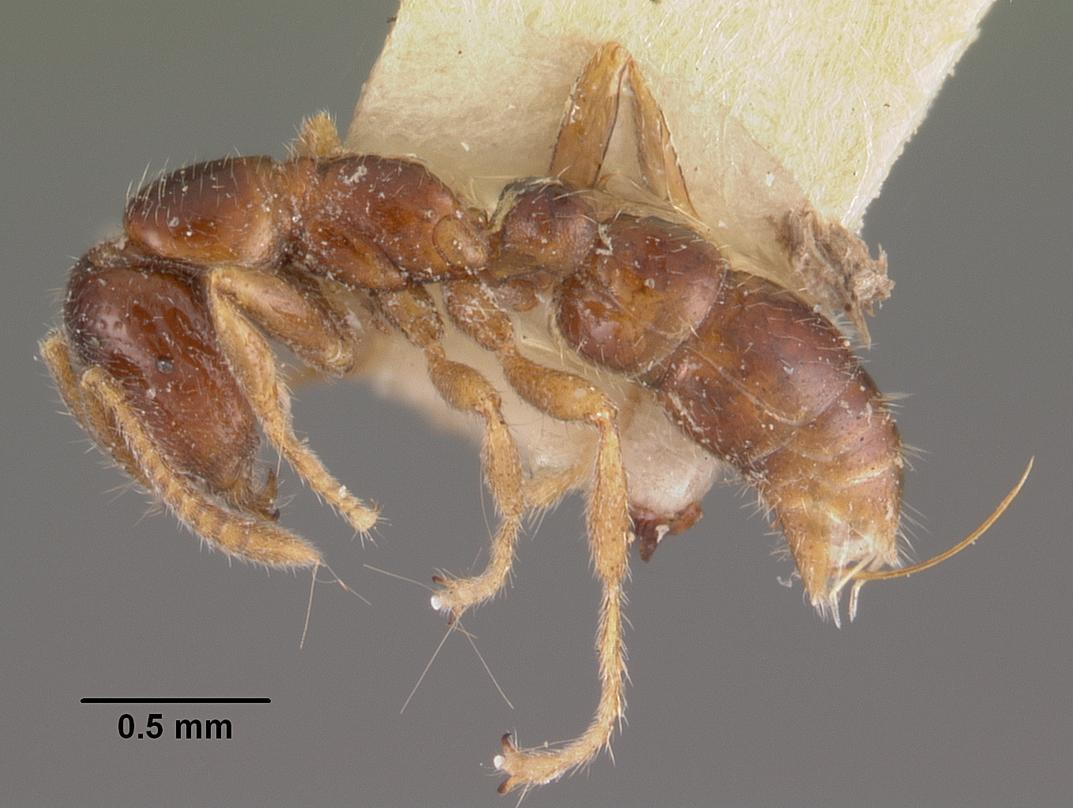
- Onychomyrmex doddi worker

Scientific classification
- Kingdom: Animalia
- Phylum: Arthropoda
- Class: Insecta
- Order: Hymenoptera
- Family: Formicidae
- Genus: Onychomyrmex
- Species: O. doddi

Binomial name
- Onychomyrmex doddi Wheeler, W.M., 1916

= Onychomyrmex doddi =

Species of ant

Onychomyrmex doddi is a species of ant in the genus Onychomyrmex, endemic to Australia. It was first described by William Morton Wheeler in 1916. Workers are small, being only 2-2.5 mm in length.
