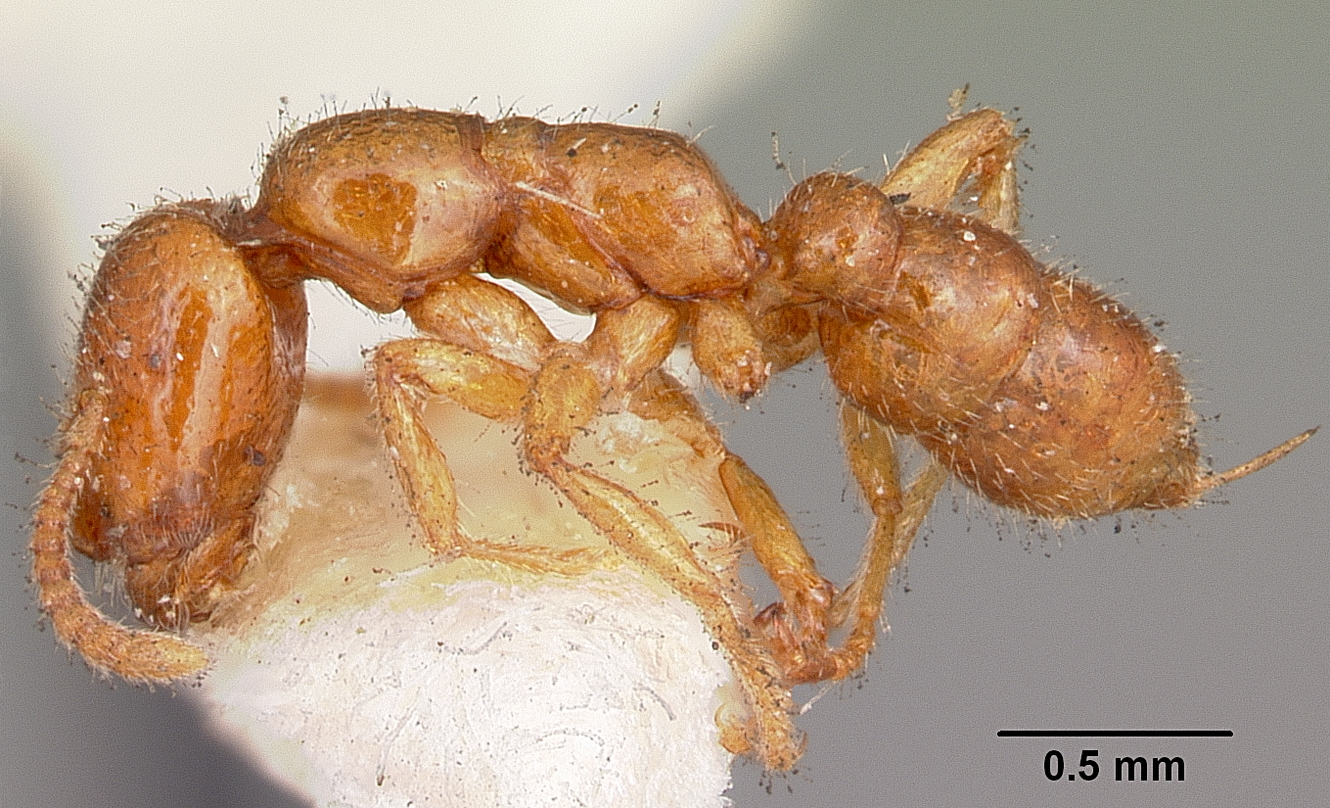
- Onychomyrmex mjobergi worker

Scientific classification
- Kingdom: Animalia
- Phylum: Arthropoda
- Class: Insecta
- Order: Hymenoptera
- Family: Formicidae
- Genus: Onychomyrmex
- Species: O. mjobergi

Binomial name
- Onychomyrmex mjobergi Forel, 1915

= Onychomyrmex mjobergi =

Species of ant

Onychomyrmex mjobergi is a species of ant in the genus Onychomyrmex. Endemic to Australia, it was described by Forel in 1915 from specimens found in Queensland.
