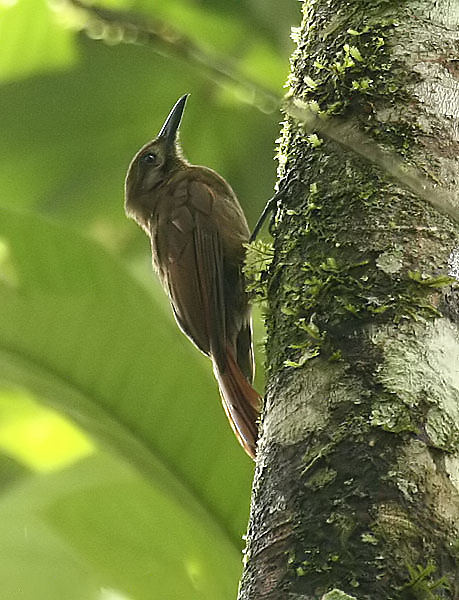

Conservation status
- Least Concern (IUCN 3.1)

Scientific classification
- Kingdom: Animalia
- Phylum: Chordata
- Class: Aves
- Order: Passeriformes
- Family: Furnariidae
- Genus: Dendrocincla
- Species: D. fuliginosa

Binomial name
- Dendrocincla fuliginosa (Vieillot, 1818)
- Range of D. fuliginosa including D. turdina taunayi (see Taxonomy section)

= Plain-brown woodcreeper =

Species of bird

The plain-brown woodcreeper (Dendrocincla fuliginosa), is a sub-oscine passerine bird in subfamily Dendrocolaptinae of the ovenbird family Furnariidae. It is found in the tropical New World from Honduras through South America to central Brazil and in Trinidad and Tobago.

== Taxonomy and systematics ==
The plain-brown woodcreeper's taxonomy is unsettled. The International Ornithological Committee (IOC) and the Clements taxonomy assign it these 11 subspecies:

- D. f. ridgwayi Oberholser, 1904
- D. f. lafresnayei Ridgway, 1888
- D. f. meruloides (Lafresnaye, 1851)
- D. f. deltana Phelps, WH & Phelps, WH Jr, 1950
- D. f. barinensis Phelps, WH & Phelps, WH Jr, 1949
- D. f. phaeochroa Berlepsch & Hartert, EJO, 1902
- D. f. neglecta Todd, 1948
- D. f. atrirostris (d'Orbigny & Lafresnaye, 1838)
- D. f. fuliginosa (Vieillot, 1818)
- D. f. rufoolivacea Ridgway, 1888
- D. f. trumaii Sick, 1950

BirdLife International's Handbook of the Birds of the World (HBW) includes subspecies taunayi in the plain-brown woodcreeper. The IOC and Clements assign it to the plain-winged woodcreeper (D. turdina), which itself was once considered to be part of the plain-brown woodcreeper.

In the past some authors have treated atrirostris as a separate species. Subspecies meruloides has in the past been treated as a separate species and also as a subspecies of the white-chinned woodcreeper (D. merula).

This article follows the 11-subspecies model.

== Description ==
The plain-brown woodcreeper is 19 to 22.5 cm (7.5 to 8.9 in) long. Males weigh 30 to 50 g (1.1 to 1.8 oz) and females 25 to 46 g (0.88 to 1.6 oz). The species is a medium-sized member of its genus, with a straight medium-length bill and a slight crest. The sexes have the same plumage but females are smaller than males. The nominate subspecies D. f. fuliginosa has a narrow buff supercilium and a faint buff stripe under an otherwise grayish face. Its crown, nape, back, and wing coverts are dull olive-brown; its uppertail coverts and tail are rufous-chestnut. Its wings are rufous-chestnut with dusky outer edges and tips on the primaries. Its throat is pale gray to buffy with fine mottling. Its breast and belly are paler olive-brown than its back and with fine buff streaks on the former. Its undertail coverts are cinnamon-rufous and its underwing coverts cinnamon-buff to ochraceous. Its iris is yellowish brown to dark brown or pale gray, its bill black with whitish, yellowish, or gray edges and tip, and its legs and feet black, slate gray, dark brownish olive, or light blue.

The other subspecies of the plain-brown woodcreeper differ from the nominate thus:

- D. f. ridgwayi, more rufescent, less mottling and streaking, a less grayish throat, and a black bill
- D. f. lafresnayei, more olivaceous especially on the belly, less mottling and streaking, a grayer throat, and a blackish brown bill
- D. f. meruloides, quite rufescent, less mottling and streaking, little contrast between throat and breast, and paler mandible than maxilla
- D. f. deltana, less mottling and streaking, little contrast between throat and breast, and paler mandible than maxilla
- D. f. barinensis, darker and browner upperparts, less mottling and streaking, more dusky underparts, and paler mandible than maxilla
- D. f. phaeochroa, darker and more olivacous upperparts, less mottling and streaking, much whiter throat, and paler mandible than maxilla
- D. f. neglecta, darker and more olivacous upperparts than phaeochroa, paler underparts, less mottling and streaking, and paler mandible than maxilla
- D. f. atrirostris, more rufescent, bold supercilium, conspicuous streaks on crown, and paler mandible than maxilla
- D. f. rufoolivacea, duller and more olivaceous overall, less streaky neck
- D. f. trumaii, more greenish than all others, bold supercilium, conspicuous streaks on crown

== Distribution and habitat ==
The subspecies of the plain-brown woodcreeper are found thus:

- D. f. ridgwayi, from northeastern Honduras through Nicaragua, Costa Rica, Panama, western Colombia, and western Ecuador into northwestern Peru
- D. f. lafresnayei, northern and eastern Colombia and adjoining northwestern Venezuela
- D. f. meruloides, northern Venezuela, Trinidad, and Tobago
- D. f. deltana, the delta of the Orinoco River in northeastern Venezuela
- D. f. barinensis, north-central Colombia and west-central Venezuela
- D. f. phaeochroa, the Amazon Basin of southeastern Colombia, southern Venezuela, and northwestern Brazil
- D. f. neglecta, the western Amazon Basin on both sides of the Amazon River from eastern Ecuador and eastern Peru to the Rio Negro and Rio Madeira
- D. f. atrirostris, the southwestern Amazon Basin in southeastern Peru, northern and central Bolivia, and southwestern Brazil to the Rio Tapajós
- D. f. fuliginosa, the Amazon Basin north of the Amazon River in southeastern Venezuela, the Guianas, and northern Brazil between the Rio Negro and the Atlantic Ocean
- D. f. rufoolivacea, Brazil south of the Amazon River between the Rio Tapajós and the state of Maranhão
- D. f. trumaii, the upper Rio Xingu in Brazil's Mato Grosso state

The plain-brown woodcreeper inhabits a variety of humid forest landscapes. It is most common in evergreen forest and occurs less frequently in deciduous and gallery forest, rainforest, and forest on sandy soils. It is occasionally found in mangroves. In the Amazon Basin it mostly inhabits terra firme and floodplain forests, and less frequently occurs in várzea and swamp forests. It mostly favors the interior of primary forest but is frequently found at its edges and in mature secondary forest. It is uncommon in young secondary forest, bamboo, and plantations. It is a bird of the lowlands and foothills, seldom occurring above 1,300 m (4,300 ft). In elevation it is mostly found below 750 m (2,500 ft) in Honduras, 900 m (3,000 ft) in Costa Rica, 1,200 m (3,900 ft) in Colombia, and 1,100 m (3,600 ft) in Ecuador. It does reach 2,000 m (6,600 ft) near the Caribbean coast in Colombia and Venezuela.

== Behavior ==
=== Movement ===
The plain-brown woodcreeper is a year-round resident throughout its range, though some local movements are suspected.

=== Feeding ===
The plain-brown woodcreeper mostly forages in the lower to mid-levels of the forest. Its diet is a wide variety of arthropods (mostly beetles and orthoptera) and also includes small vertebrates like lizards. It often follows army ant swarms to feed on prey fleeing the ants, but is not exclusively an ant-follower. It often forages alone, as a member of a mixed-species feeding flock, and by following South American coatis (Nasua nasua) and troops of monkeys . When attending an ant swarm it clings to a vertical trunk or vine, typically between 4 and 10 m (13 and 33 ft) above the ground. It makes brief flights to capture prey from other trunks and stems, foliage, the ground, and in mid-air. Away from ants it may perch higher or lower, and on horizontal branches.

=== Breeding ===
The plain-brown woodcreeper's nesting season varies geographically, from May to October in Central America and apparently August to December in Amazonia. It builds a cup nest of dead leaves, plant fibers, and plant down at the bottom of a cavity in a stump, bamboo, or palm; it may first build up a deep cavity with moss. Pairs appear to bond only briefly and only females are known to incubate eggs and tend nestlings. The clutch size is one to three eggs. The incubation period is not known; fledging occurs 23 to 25 days after hatch.

=== Vocalization ===
The plain-brown woodcreeper's song is variously described as a long whinny, rattle, or sputter. It has been put into words as "Whee-hee-he-hah-huh-huh-huh-huh-huh-huh-huh-hu-hu-hu-hu-hu-hu-hoo-hoo-hooh, wee-i-woo!", "keé-keé-keé-kee-kee-kee-kew-kew-kew", and a "long series of sweeping 'weekweekweek---' notes". It makes a wide variety of calls; the most frequent are "peeyk" (or "PWEEK!"), "stieek", and "squeeeik". Others include "sweeuh", "chauhh", "cheeng, cheeng", and "pooo".

== Status ==
The IUCN follows HBW taxonomy and so includes the plain-winged woodcreeper's D. turdina taunayi subspecies in its evaluation of the plain-brown woodcreeper. It has assessed the species as being of Least Concern. It has an extremely large range and an estimated population of at least five million mature individuals, though the population is believed to be decreasing. It "is considered highly sensitive to habitat fragmentation and human disturbance in at least parts of its range, and is likely to have suffered declines owing to deforestation". It is the most common and most widespread Dendrocincla woodcreeper. It is considered uncommon to locally common in most of its range, though it is scarce in the northernmost parts of it. It is thought "less sensitive than are 'professional' ant-followers in that its numbers may remain stable, at least over short term, in both selectively logged forest and all but the smallest forest fragments".
