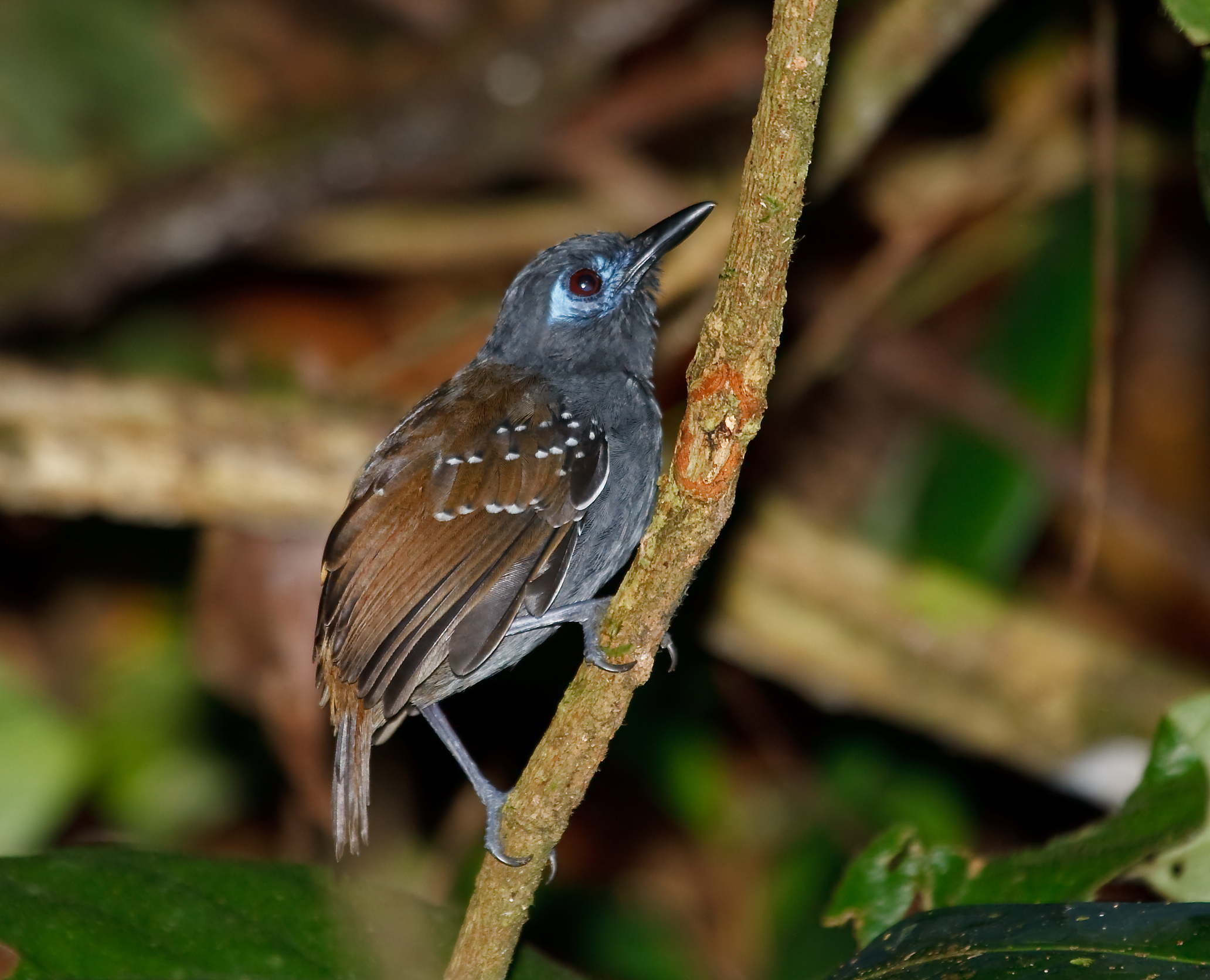

Conservation status
- Least Concern (IUCN 3.1)

- Least Concern (IUCN 3.1)

Scientific classification
- Kingdom: Animalia
- Phylum: Chordata
- Class: Aves
- Order: Passeriformes
- Family: Thamnophilidae
- Genus: Poliocrania; Bravo, Isler, ML & Brumfield, 2013
- Species: P. exsul

Binomial name
- Poliocrania exsul (Sclater, PL, 1859)

Synonyms
- Myrmeciza exsul

= Chestnut-backed antbird =

Species of bird

The chestnut-backed antbird (Poliocrania exsul) is a passerine bird in subfamily Thamnophilinae of family Thamnophilidae, the "typical antbirds". It is found in Colombia, Costa Rica, Ecuador, Honduras, Nicaragua, and Panama.

== Taxonomy and systematics ==
The chestnut-backed antbird was described by the English zoologist Philip Sclater in 1859 and given the binomial name Myrmeciza exsul. A molecular phylogenetic study published in 2013 found that the genus Myrmeciza, as then defined, was polyphyletic. In the resulting rearrangement to create monophyletic genera, the chestnut-backed antbird was moved to a newly erected genus Poliocrania. The name of the new genus combines the Ancient Greek words polios "ash-gray" and kranion "head" or "skull". The chestnut-backed antbird is the only member of genus Poliocrania.

The International Ornithological Congress, the Clements taxonomy, and both the North and South American Classification Committees of the American Ornithological Society assign these five subspecies to the chestnut-backed antbird:

- P. e. exsul (Sclater, PL, 1859)
- P. e. occidentalis (Cherrie, 1891)
- P. e. cassini (Ridgway, 1908)
- P. e. niglarus (Wetmore, 1962)
- P. e. maculifer (Hellmayr, 1906)

However, BirdLife International's Handbook of the Birds of the World (HBW) treats P. e. cassini and P. e. maculifer as a separate species, the short-tailed antbird Poliocrania maculifer, and retains the English name chestnut-backed antbird for the other three subspecies.

This article follows the one-species, five-subspecies model.

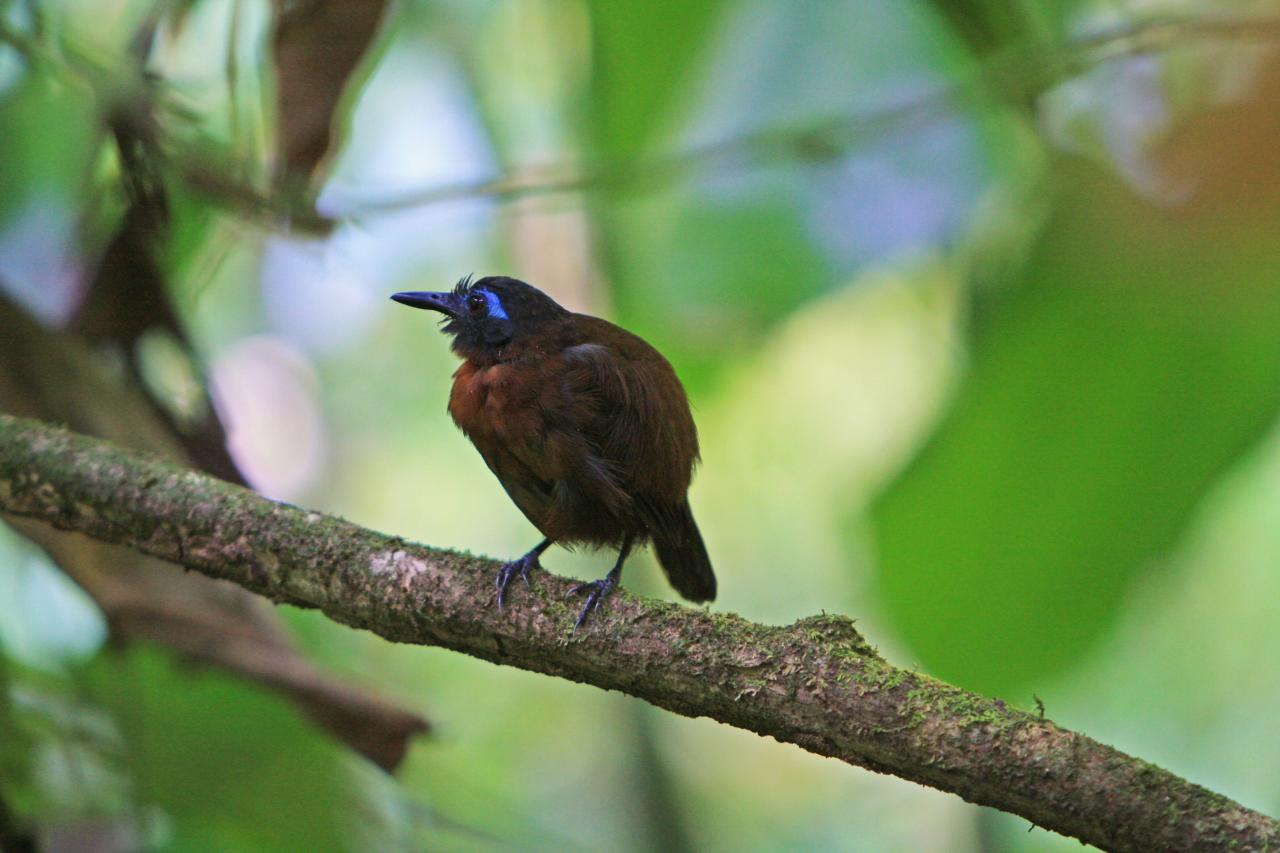
Female M. e. occidentalis in Corcovado National Park, Costa Rica

== Description ==
The chestnut-backed antbird is 14 to 15 centimetres (5.5 to 5.9 in) long and weighs about 29 grams (1.0 oz). Both sexes of all subspecies have a pale blue patch of bare skin around each eye. Adult males of the nominate subspecies P. e. exsul have a slate-black head and neck. Their upperparts are deep chestnut. Their wings and tail are deep chestnut with some black and white on the wing coverts. Their throat, breast, and belly are blackish slate and their flanks, vent area, and undertail coverts are brown. Adult females have a duller black head and neck than males; their upperparts are otherwise the same as the male's. Their chin and throat are duller slate-blackish than the male's and the rest of their underparts are brown. Both sexes have a reddish brown iris, a black bill, and dark horn to blackish legs and feet.

Males of subspecies P. e. occidentalis are paler overall than the nominate but otherwise similar. Females have similar upperparts to the nominate but bright tawny-chestnut or rufous-chestnut throat and upper breast, tawny-russet lower breast and belly, and tawny-brown flanks, vent, and undertail coverts. Males of subspecies P. e. maculifer are like nominate males with the addition of white tips on their wing coverts. Females also resemble the nominate except for rufous-chestnut underparts. Males of P. e. cassini are similar to but paler than the nominate and have wide white tips on their wing coverts. Females have a buff breast and otherwise cinnamon-orange underparts. Males of P. e. niglarus have slightly lighter upperparts than the nominate. Females have brighter underparts than the nominate but darker than those of occidentalis.

Considerable intergradation exists among the subspecies.

== Distribution and habitat ==
The subspecies of the chestnut-backed antbird are found thus:

- P. e. exsul: from eastern Honduras along the Caribbean slope through Nicaragua and Costa Rica into Panama to near the Panama Canal
- P. e. occidentalis: Pacific slope of western Costa Rica and western Panama to Veraguas Province
- P. e. cassini: from extreme southeastern Panama south of the Bay of San Miguel into northern Colombia east to Cesar Department and south in the Magdalena Valley
- P. e. niglarus: Panama east of the Canal in Colón Province and on the Pacific slope from Panama Province south into northern Chocó Department in far northwestern Colombia
- P. e. maculifer: Pacific slope from central Chocó in Colombia south into western Ecuador as far as El Oro Province

Most of the chestnut-backed antbird subspecies inhabit the understorey in the interior of humid to wet evergreen forest. The occur in both primary and secondary forest though they prefer the former. They favor dense vegetation, vine tangles, and the undergrowth of older gaps caused by fallen trees. Subspecies P. e. occidentalis inhabits drier and more open semi-humid transitional forest than the other subspecies and occurs more often in younger secondary forest. In elevation the species occurs to 1,200 m (3,900 ft) in Honduras, Costa Rica, and Colombia and to about 1,000 m (3,300 ft) in much of the rest of Central America. In Ecuador it mostly occurs below 900 m (3,000 ft) but locally reaches 1,500 m (4,900 ft) in Pichincha Province.

== Behavior ==
=== Movement ===
The chestnut-backed antbird is a year-round resident throughout its range.

=== Feeding ===
The chesnut-backed antbird feeds primarily on insects and other arthropods and also takes small lizards and frogs. Pairs and family groups usually forage in dense vegetation on and near the ground but also in more open situations. It walks and makes short flutter-flights while picking prey from the substrate. It sometimes joins mixed-species feeding flocks and attends army ant swarms that pass through its territory.

=== Breeding ===
The chestnut-backed antbird is monogamous and pairs defend territory year-round. Its breeding season has not been fully defined but on Panama's Barro Colorado Island it includes June to August. It builds a cup nest of dead leaves and ferns, rootlets, and moss lined with fine fungal rhizomorphs. The nest is typically near the ground but seldom on it. The usual clutch size is two eggs; they are whitish with purplish to brown blotches. The incubation period is about 16 days and fledging occurs about 11 days after hatch. Both parents incubate the clutch during the day and females alone at night; both provision nestlings.

=== Vocalization ===
The chestnut-backed antbird's song is "an easily recognized and imitated set of 2–3 whistled notes, 'peh, peeea' or 'peh, phe, peeéa'...paraphrased as 'come...here' or 'come...right...here' ". Others have written it as "drink beer! or drink more beer!". Its calls include "rah, didit, and pew".

== Status ==
The IUCN follows HBW taxonomy and so has separately assessed the chestnut-backed (sensu stricto) and "short-tailed" antbirds. Both are assessed as being of Least Concern. Both have large ranges and unknown population sizes that are believed to be decreasing. No immediate threats to the short-tailed antbird have been identified. However, the chestnut-backed "is threatened by extensive logging of forests within the range, mostly as a consequence of agricultural expansion, livestock farming, conversion to plantations, and urbanization".
