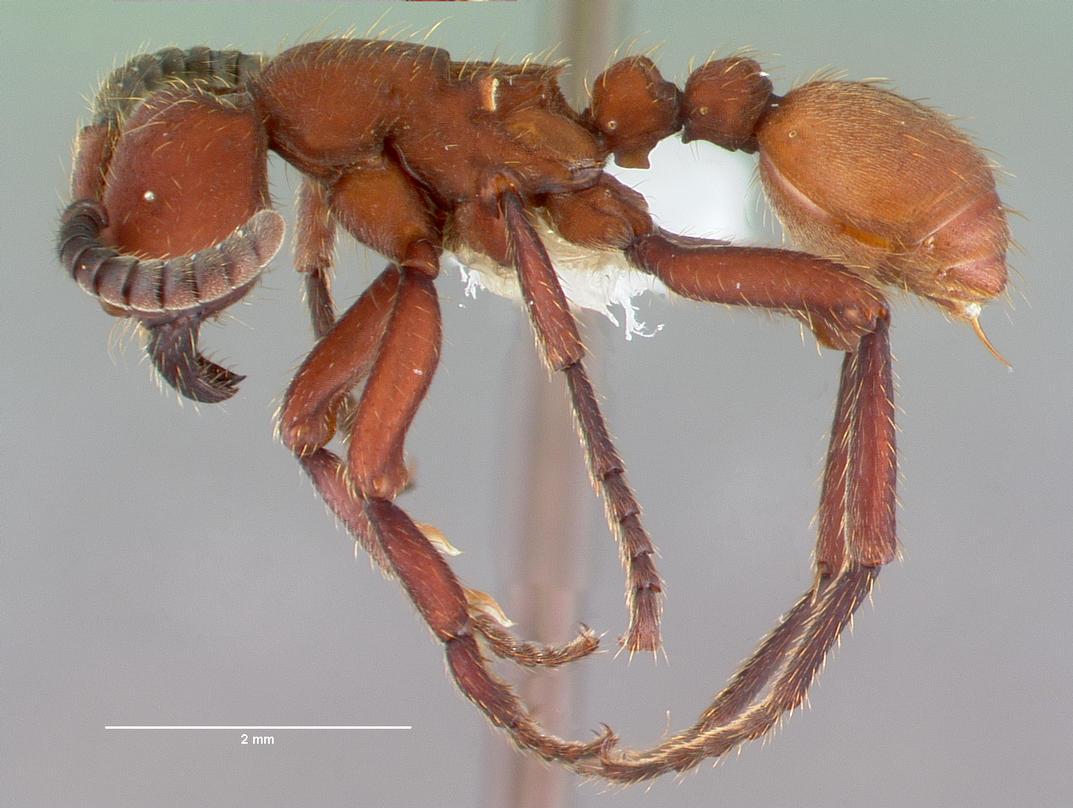
- Nomamyrmex esenbeckii media worker

Scientific classification
- Kingdom: Animalia
- Phylum: Arthropoda
- Clade: Pancrustacea
- Class: Insecta
- Order: Hymenoptera
- Family: Formicidae
- Subfamily: Dorylinae
- Genus: Nomamyrmex; Borgmeier, 1936

Type species
- Eciton crassicornis

Diversity
- 2 species

= Nomamyrmex =

Genus of ants

Nomamyrmex is a genus of army ants in the subfamily Dorylinae. Its two species are distributed in the Neotropics: Nomamyrmex esenbeckii is known from southern United States to northern Argentina, and Nomamyrmex hartigii is known from Mexico to southern Brazil. Nomamyrmex esenbeckii is the only known predator of mature colonies of Atta leaf-cutter ants.

Nomamyrmex does not live in stable colonies but has a nomadic lifestyle.

== Species ==
- Nomamyrmex esenbeckii (Westwood, 1842)
- Nomamyrmex hartigii (Westwood, 1842)
