= Biotic potential =

Biotic potential is described by the unrestricted growth of populations resulting in the maximum growth of that population. Biotic potential is the highest possible vital index of a species; therefore, when the species has its highest birthrate and lowest mortality rate.

== Quantitative Expression ==
The biotic potential is the quantitative expression of the ability of a species to face natural selection in any environment. The main equilibrium of a particular population is described by the equation:

Number of Individuals = Biotic Potential/Resistance of the Environment (Biotic and Abiotic)

Chapman also relates to a "vital index", regarding a ratio to find the rate of surviving members of a species, whereas;

Vital Index = (number of births/number of deaths)*100.

== Components ==
According to the ecologist R.N. Chapman (1928), the biotic potential could be divided into a reproductive and survival potential. The survival potential could in turn be divided into nutritive and protective potentials.

Reproductive potential (potential natality) is the upper limit to biotic potential in the absence of mortality. Survival potential is the reciprocal of mortality. Because reproductive potential does not account for the number of gametes surviving, survival potential is a necessary component of biotic potential. In the absence of mortality, biotic potential = reproductive potential.

Chapman also identified two additional components of nutritive and protective potentials as divisions of the survival potential. Nutritive potential is the ability to acquire and use food for growth and energy. Protective potential is described by the ability of the organism to protect itself against the dynamic forces of environment in order to insure successful reproduction and offspring.

Full expression of the biotic potential of an organism is restricted by environmental resistance, any condition that inhibits the increase in number of the population. It is generally only reached when environmental conditions are very favorable. A species reaching its biotic potential would exhibit exponential population growth and be said to have a high fertility, that is, how many offspring are produced per mother.
