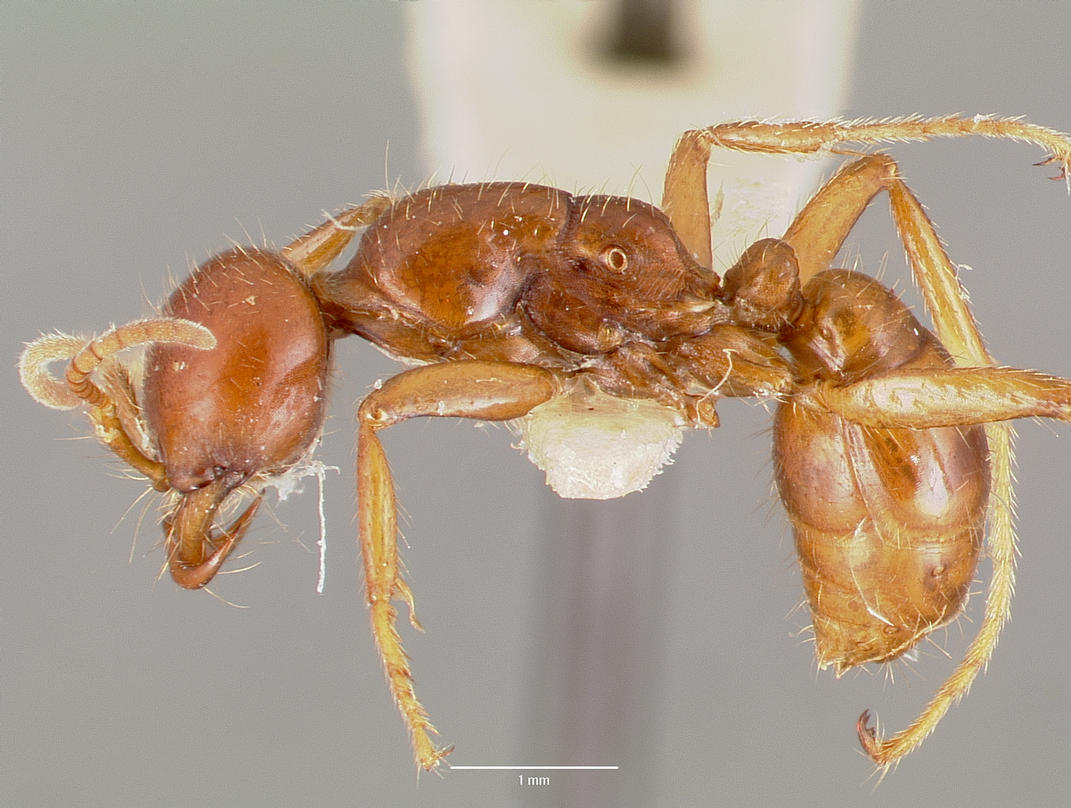
- Cheliomyrmex megalonyx major worker

Scientific classification
- Domain: Eukaryota
- Kingdom: Animalia
- Phylum: Arthropoda
- Class: Insecta
- Order: Hymenoptera
- Family: Formicidae
- Subfamily: Dorylinae
- Genus: Cheliomyrmex; Mayr, 1870

Type species
- Cheliomyrmex nortoni Mayr, 1870

Diversity
- 4 species

= Cheliomyrmex =

Genus of ants

Cheliomyrmex is a New World genus of army ants in the subfamily Dorylinae. In Central America, C. morosus is known from Mexico to Honduras, and Panama. C. andicola, C. audax, C. ursinus and C. megalonyx are known from Colombia and further into South America.

== Species ==
- Cheliomyrmex andicola Emery, 1894
- Cheliomyrmex audax Santschi, 1921
- Cheliomyrmex megalonyx Wheeler, 1921
- Cheliomyrmex morosus (Smith, 1859)
