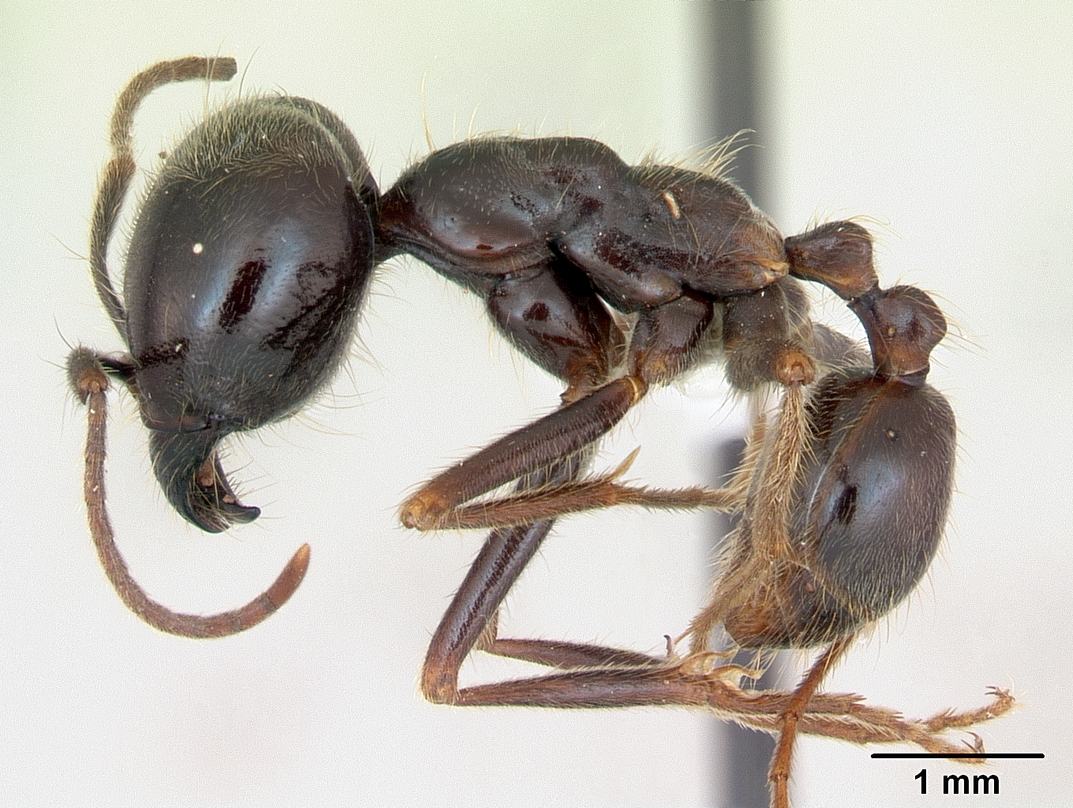
- Labidus praedator

Scientific classification
- Domain: Eukaryota
- Kingdom: Animalia
- Phylum: Arthropoda
- Class: Insecta
- Order: Hymenoptera
- Family: Formicidae
- Subfamily: Dorylinae
- Genus: Labidus; Jurine, 1807

Type species
- Labidus latreillii

Diversity
- 7 species

Synonyms
- Nycteresia Roger, 1861; Pseudodichthadia André, 1885

= Labidus =

Genus of ants

Labidus is a genus of New World army ants in the subfamily Dorylinae. The genus is known from the United States to Argentina.

== Species ==
- Labidus auropubens (Santschi, 1920)
- Labidus coecus (Latreille, 1802)
- Labidus curvipes (Emery, 1900)
- Labidus mars (Forel, 1912)
- Labidus praedator (Smith, 1858)
- Labidus spininodis (Emery, 1890)
- Labidus truncatidens (Santschi, 1920)

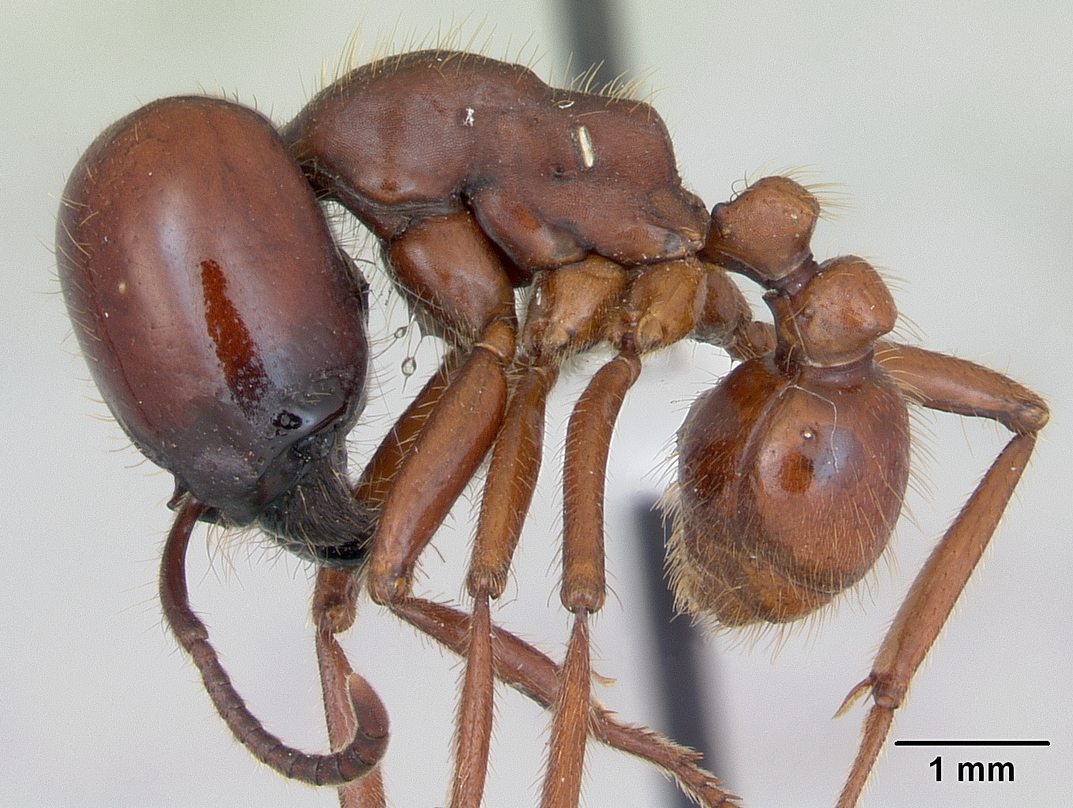
Labidus coecus
