= Army ant =

Name used for several ant species

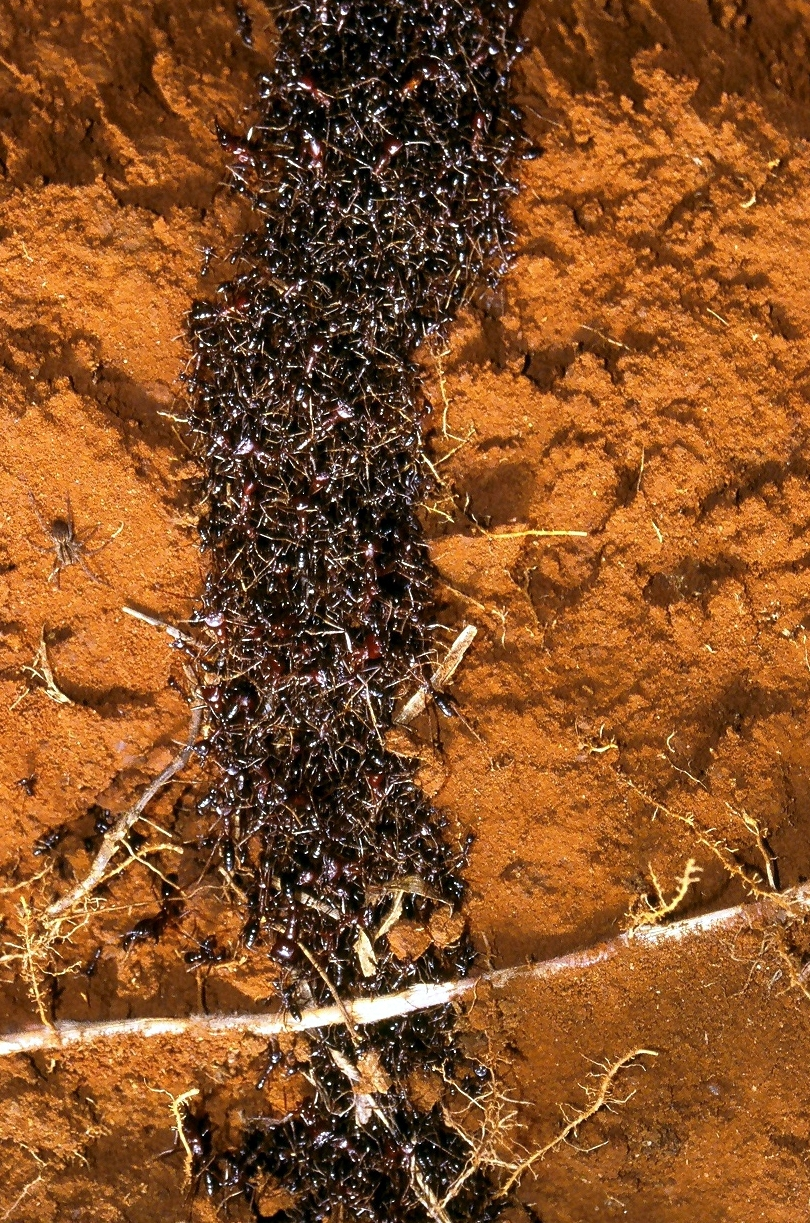
African Dorylus raid

The name army ant (or legionary ant or marabunta) is applied to over 200 ant species in different lineages. Because of their aggressive predatory foraging groups, known as "raids", a huge number of ants forage simultaneously over a limited area.

Another shared feature is that, unlike most ant species, army ants do not construct permanent nests; an army ant colony moves almost incessantly over the time it exists. All species are members of the true ant family, Formicidae, but several groups have independently evolved the same basic behavioural and ecological syndrome. This syndrome is often referred to as "legionary behaviour", and may be an example of convergent evolution. (Note: "There are also interesting [evolutionary] convergences within the ants. Although most ant colonies live a settled existence in a fixed nest, there seems to be a successful living to be made by wandering in enormous pillaging armies. This is called the legionary habit." (Dawkins 1986))

Most New World army ants belong to the genera Cheliomyrmex, Neivamyrmex, Nomamyrmex, Labidus, and Eciton. The largest genus is Neivamyrmex, which contains more than 120 species; the most predominant species is Eciton burchellii; its common name "army ant" is considered to be the archetype of the species. Most Old World army ants are divided between the tribes Aenictini and Dorylini. Aenictini contains more than 50 species of army ants in the single genus, Aenictus. However, the Dorylini contain the genus Dorylus, the most aggressive group of driver ants; 70 species are known.

Originally, some of the Old World and New World lineages of army ants were thought to have evolved independently, in an example of convergent evolution. In 2003, though, genetic analysis of various species suggests that several of these groups evolved from a single common ancestor, which lived approximately 100 million years ago at the time of the separation of the continents of Africa and South America, while other army ant lineages (Leptanillinae, plus members of Ponerinae, Amblyoponinae, and Myrmicinae) are still considered to represent independent evolutionary events. Army ant taxonomy remains in flux, and genetic analysis will likely continue to provide more information about the relatedness of the various taxa.

== Morphology ==
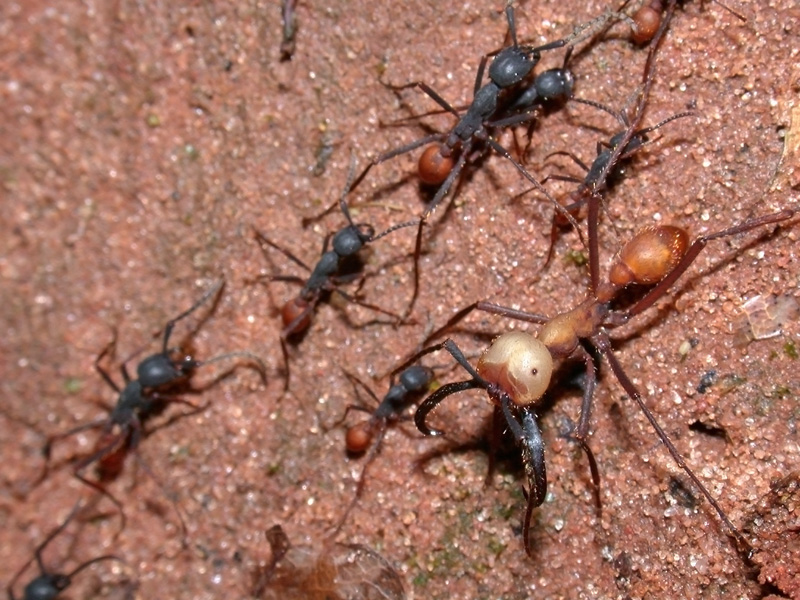
An Eciton burchellii large soldier guarding smaller workers

=== Workers ===
The workers of army ants are usually blind or can have compound eyes that are reduced to a single lens. There are species of army ants where the worker caste may show polymorphism based on physical differences and job allocations; however, there are also species that show no polymorphism at all. The worker caste is usually composed of sterile female worker ants.

=== Soldiers ===
The soldiers of army ants are larger than the workers, and they have much larger mandibles than the worker class of ants, with older soldiers possessing larger heads and stronger mandibles than the younger ones. They protect the colony, and help carry the heaviest loads of prey to the colony bivouac.

=== Males ===
Males are large in size and have a large cylindrical abdomen, highly modified mandibles and uncommon genitalia not seen in other ants. They have 13 segments on their antennae, are alate (have wings) and therefore can resemble wasps. Males are born as part of a sexual brood. As soon as they are born, they will fly off in search of a queen to mate with. In some instances where males seek to mate with a queen from an existing colony, the receiving workers will forcibly remove the wings in order to accommodate the large males into the colony for mating. Because of their size, males are sometimes called "sausage flies" or "sausage ants."

=== Queen ===
Colonies of real army ants always have only one queen, while some other ant species can have several queens. The queen is dichthadiigyne (a blind ant with large gaster) but may sometimes possess vestigial eyes. The queens of army ants are unique in that they do not have wings, have an enlarged gaster size and an extended cylindrical abdomen. They are significantly larger than worker army ants and possess 10–12 segments on their antennae. Queens will mate with multiple males and because of their enlarged gaster, can produce 3 to 4 million eggs a month, resulting in synchronized brood cycles and colonies composed of millions of individuals all related to a single queen.

== Behaviour ==
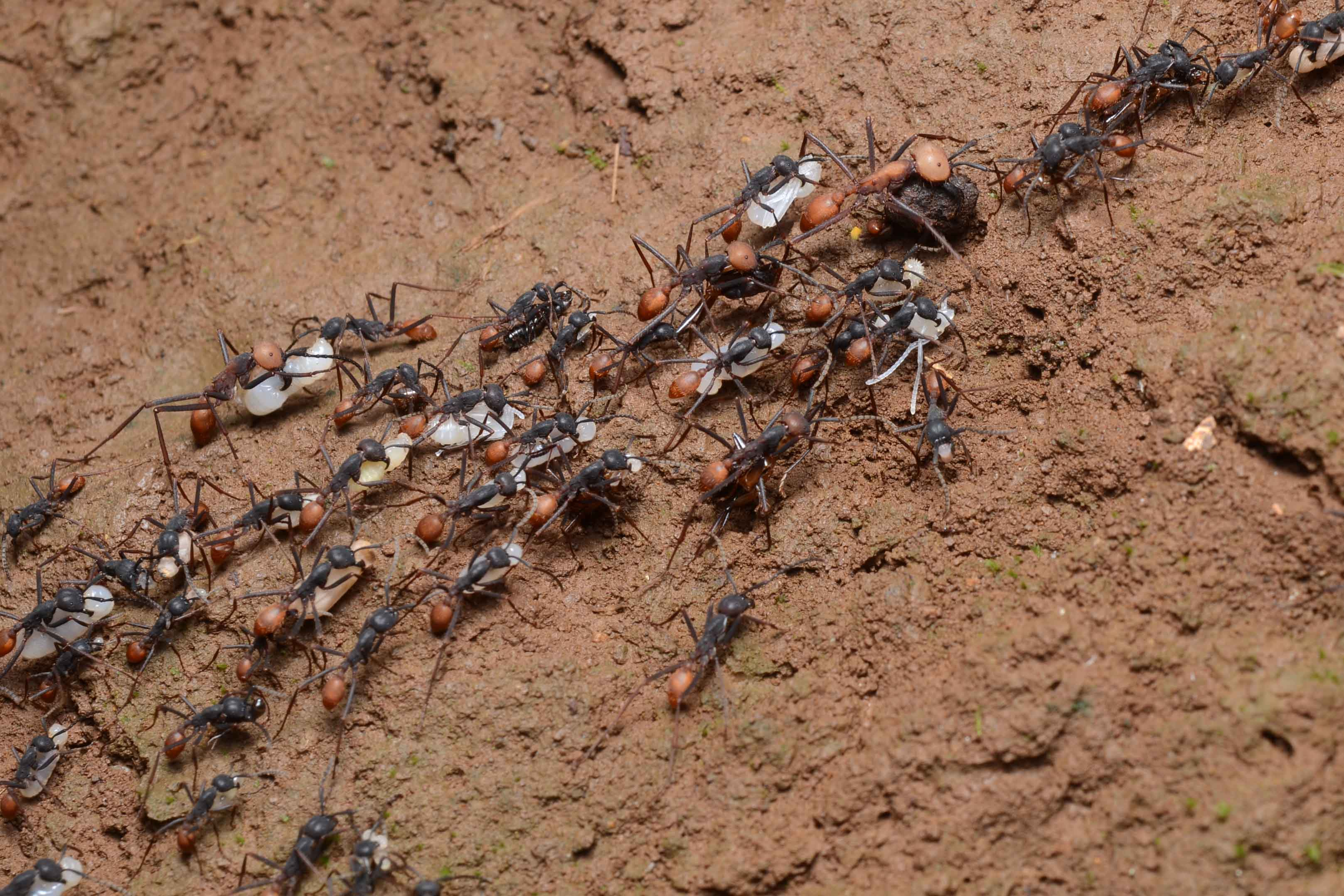
E. vagans with larvae of a raided wasp nest

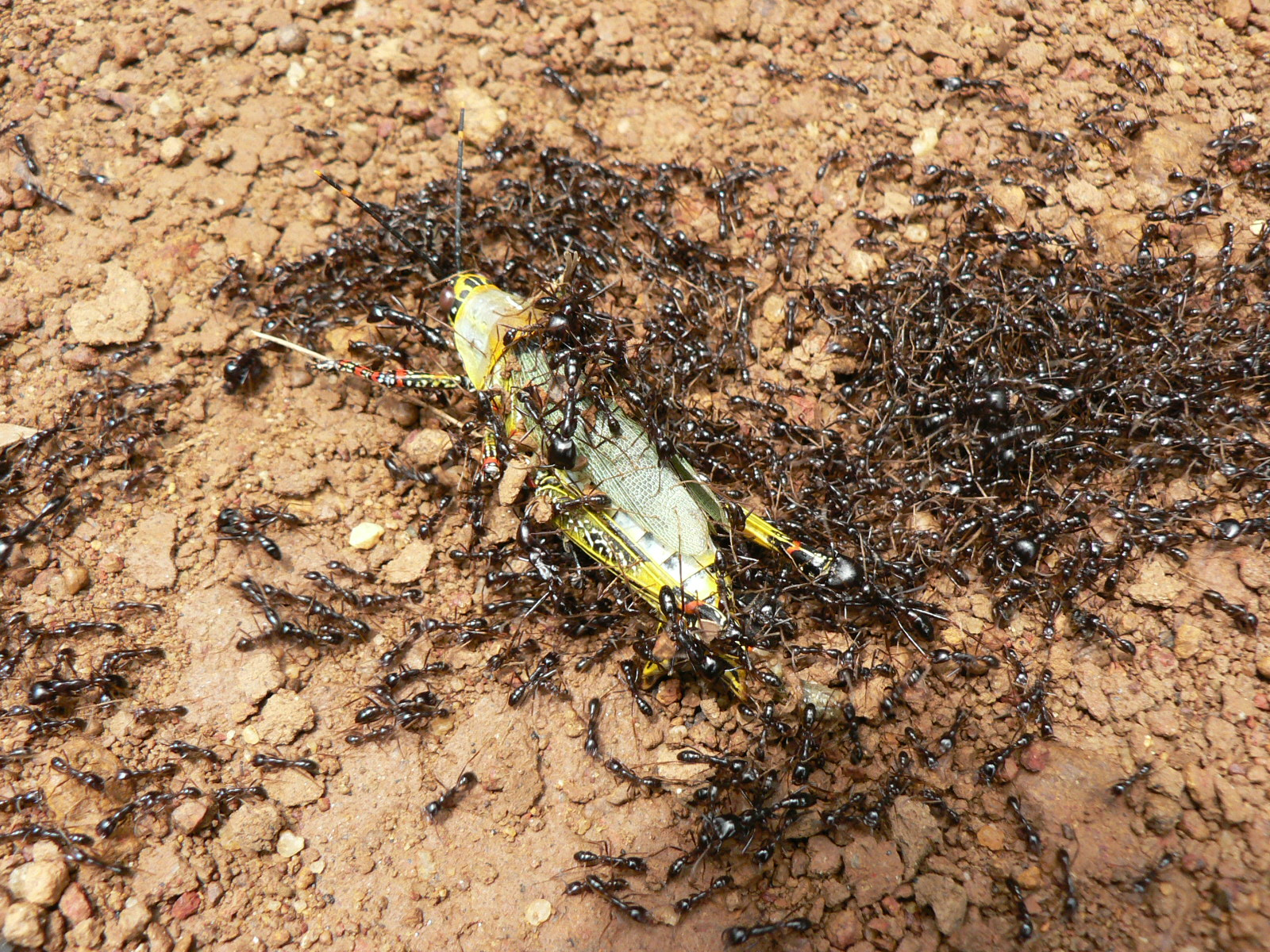
Dorylus sp. in Cameroon, consuming a grasshopper

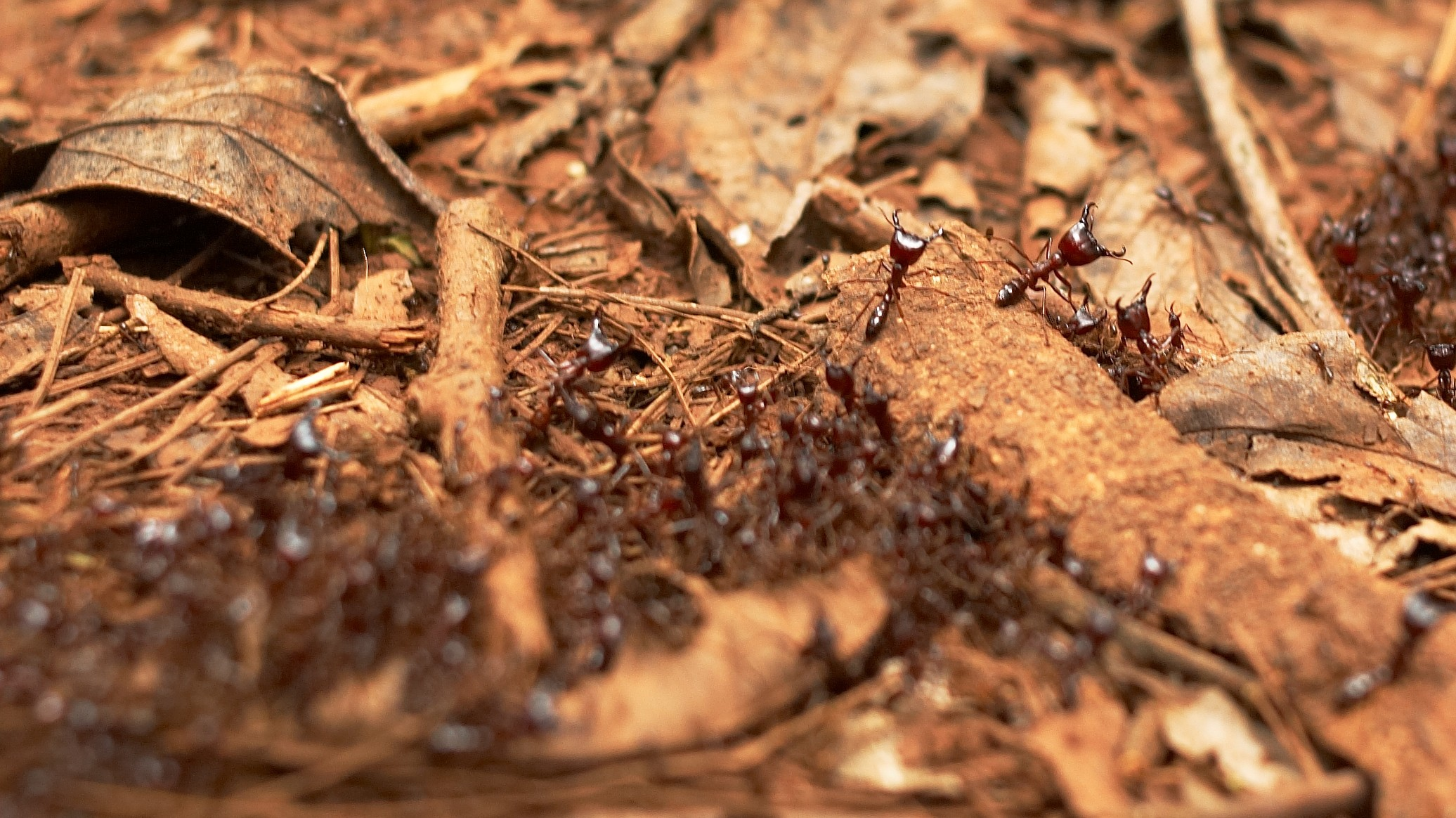
Safari ants (Dorylus sp.) on a march in Kakamega Forest, Kenya. A column of workers moves under the protection of the soldiers, who link together into a tunnel and display their mandibles to ward off predators

=== Army ant syndrome ===
The term "army ant syndrome" refers to behavioral and reproductive traits such as obligate collective foraging, nomadism and highly specialized queens that allow these organisms to become the most ferocious social hunters.

Most ant species will send individual scouts to find food sources and later recruit others from the colony to help; however, army ants dispatch a cooperative, leaderless group of foragers to detect and overwhelm the prey at once. Army ants do not have a permanent nest but instead form many bivouacs as they travel. The constant traveling is due to the need to hunt large amounts of prey to feed its enormous colony population. Their queens are wingless and have abdomens that expand significantly during egg production. This allows for the production of 3–4 million eggs every month and often results in synchronized brood cycles, thus each colony will be formed of millions of individuals that descend from a single queen. These three traits are found in all army ant species and are the defining traits of army ants.

==== Nomadic and stationary phase ====
Army ants have two phases of activity – a nomadic (wandering) phase and a stationary (statary) phase – that constantly cycle, and can be found throughout all army ant species.

The nomadic phase begins around 10 days after the queen lays her eggs. This phase will last approximately 15 days to let the larvae develop. The ants move during the day, capturing insects, spiders, and small vertebrates to feed their brood. At dusk, they will form their nests or bivouac, which they change almost daily. At the end of the nomadic phase, the larvae will spin pupal cases and no longer require food. The colony can then live in the same bivouac site for around 20 days, foraging only on approximately two-thirds of these days. This pattern of diurnal activity does not apply to all army ants: there are also species that forage at night (nocturnal) or at both day and night (cathemeral).

The stationary phase, which lasts about two to three weeks, begins when the larvae pupate. From this point on, the prey that were previously fed to the larvae are now fed exclusively to the queen. The abdomen (gaster) of the queen swells significantly, and she lays her eggs. At the end of the stationary phase, both the pupae emerge from their cocoons (eclosion) and the next generation of eggs hatch so the colony has a new group of workers and larvae. After this, the ants resume the nomadic phase.

Behaviour and organization of a bivouac

=== Colony fission ===
Army ants will split into groups when the size of the colony has reached a size threshold, which happens approximately every three years. Wingless virgin queens will hatch among a male sexual brood that hatches at a later date. When the colony splits, there are two ways new queens are decided. A possible outcome is a new queen will stay at the original nest with a portion of the workers and the male brood while the old queen will leave with the rest of the workers and find a new nest. Another possibility is that the workers will reject the old queen and new queens will each head a newly-divided colony. The workers will affiliate with individual queens based on the pheromone cues that are unique to each queen. When new bivouacs are formed, communication between the original colony and the new bivouacs will cease.

=== Queen behaviour ===
Being the largest ants on Earth, army ants, such as African Dorylus queens have the greatest reproductive potential among insects, with an egg-laying capacity of several million per month. Army ant queens never have to leave the protection of the colony, where they mate with foreign incoming males which disperse on nuptial flights. The exact mating behaviour of the army ant queen is still unknown, but observations seem to imply that queens may be fertilized by multiple males. Due to the queen's large reproductive potential, a colony of army ants can be descended from a single queen.

When the queen ant dies, there is no replacement and army ants cannot rear emergency queens. Most of the time, if the queen dies, the colony will likely die too. Queen loss can occur due to accidents during emigrations, predator attack, old age or illness. However, there are possibilities to avoid colony death. When a colony loses its queen, the worker ants will usually fuse with another colony that has a queen, within a few days. Sometimes, the workers will backtrack along the paths of prior emigrations to search for a queen that has been lost or merge with a sister colony. By merging with a related colony, the workers would increase their overall inclusive fitness. The workers that merge into a new colony may cause the colony to increase in size by 50%.

==== Sexual selection by workers ====
Workers in army ant species have a unique role in selecting both the queen and the male mate.

When the queens emerge, the workers in the colony will form two 'systems' or arms in opposite directions. These queens that are hatched will move down either of the arms and only two queens will succeed, one for each branch. Any remaining new queens will be left in the middle and are abandoned. Two new bivouacs will be formed and break off into different directions. The workers will surround the two to-be queens to ensure they survive. These workers that surround the queens are affected by the CHC (pheromone) profile emitted by the new queen.

When males hatch from their brood, they will fly off to find a mate. For males to access the queen and mate with her, they must run through the workers in the colony. Males that are favoured are superficially similar in size and shape to the queen. The males also produce large quantities of pheromones to pacify the worker ants.

=== Reproduction responsibilities and problems ===
In a colony, the queen is the primary individual responsible for reproduction in the colony. Analysis of genotypes have confirmed that workers are, on average, more closely related to the offspring of the queen than to that of other workers, and that workers rarely, if ever, reproduce. Three factors have been suggested to rationalize the loss of worker reproduction in the presence of a queen. First, if the worker reproduces, it lowers the general performance of the colony because it is not working. Second, workers increase their inclusive fitness by policing other workers because they themselves are more related to the queen's offspring than other worker's offspring. Lastly, the large male larvae become too large to be transported, forcing colonies with a sexual brood to nest for a period of 41–56 days, as compared to non-reproductive colonies that remain in the nest an average of 17 days before returning to a nomadic phase. This suggests that if workers produced male offspring, they might be hatched out of sync with the queen's sexual brood and not likely to be successfully reared to adulthood.

=== Ant mills ===
Army ants can get lost from the pheromone track while foraging, making the ants follow each other in a circular motion, potentially causing them to die of exhaustion.

== Foraging ==
The whole colony of army ants can consume up to 500,000 prey animals each day, so can have a significant influence on the population, diversity, and behaviour of their prey. The prey selection differs with the species. Underground species prey primarily on ground-dwelling arthropods and their larvae, earthworms, and occasionally also the young of vertebrates, turtle eggs, or oily seeds. A majority of the species, the "colony robbers", specialize in the offspring of other ants and wasps. Only a few species seem to have the very broad spectrum of prey seen in the raiding species. Even these species do not eat every kind of animal. Although small vertebrates that get caught in the raid will be killed, the jaws of the American Eciton are not suited to this type of prey, in contrast to the African Dorylus. These undesired prey are simply left behind and consumed by scavengers or by the flies that accompany the ant swarm. Only a few species hunt primarily on the surface of the earth; they seek their prey mainly in leaf litter and in low vegetation. About five species hunt in higher trees, where they can attack birds and their eggs, although they focus on hunting other social insects along with their eggs and larvae. Colonies of army ants are large compared to the colonies of other Formicidae. Colonies can have over 15 million workers and can transport 3000 prey (items) per hour during the raid period.

When army ants forage, the trails that are formed can be over 20 m (66 ft) wide and over 100 m (330 ft) long. They stay on the path through the use of a concentration gradient of pheromones. The concentration of pheromone is highest in the middle of the trail, splitting the trail into two distinct regions: an area with high concentration and two areas with low concentrations of pheromones. The outbound ants will occupy the outer two lanes and the returning ants will occupy the central lane. The returning worker ants have also been found to emit more pheromones than those leaving the nest, causing the difference in concentration of pheromones in the trails. These pheromones allow foraging to be much more efficient by allowing the army ants to avoid their own former paths and those of their conspecifics. Army ants have also been observed forming scaffolding structures to help secure the foraging trail and prevent other ants falling off in difficult terrain, such as on inclines above 40° and when carrying heavy prey items.

While foraging, army ants cause many invertebrates to flee from their hiding places under leaves of the forest floor, under tree bark, and other such locations, thereby allowing predators to catch them more easily. For example, in the tropical rainforests of Panama, swarms of army ants attract many species of birds to this feast of scrambling insects, spiders, scorpions, worms, and other animals. Some of these birds are named "antbirds" due to this tendency. While focused on feeding on these invertebrates, birds at army-ant swarms typically allow very close approach by people – within 1–2 metres (3.3–6.6 ft) in many cases – often providing the best opportunities to see many of these species. Depending on the size of the ant swarm and the amount of prey the ants stir up, birds can number from a few to dozens of individuals. Birds that frequent army-ant swarms include the white-whiskered puffbird, rufous motmot, rufous-vented ground cuckoo, grey-cowled wood rail, plain-brown woodcreeper, northern barred woodcreeper, cocoa woodcreeper, black-striped woodcreeper, fasciated antshrike, black-crowned antshrike, spotted antbird, bicolored antbird, ocellated antbird, chestnut-backed antbird, black-faced antthrush, and the gray-headed tanager.

== Nesting ==
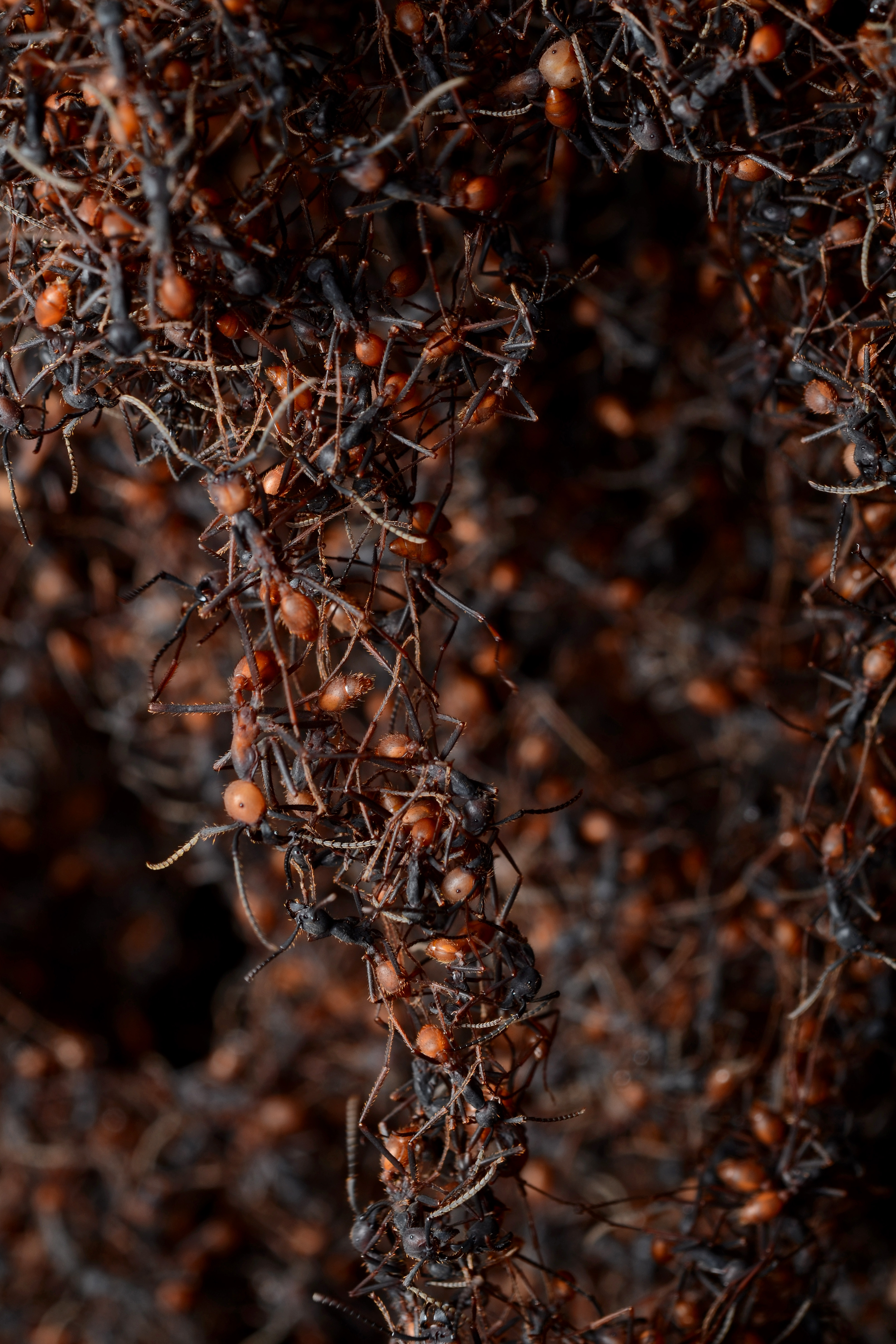
Eciton sp. forming a bridge

Army ants do not build a nest like most other ants. Instead, they build a living nest with their bodies, known as a bivouac. Bivouacs tend to be found in tree trunks or in burrows dug by the ants. The members of the bivouac hold onto each other's legs and so build a sort of ball, which may look unstructured to a layman's eyes, but is actually a well-organized structure. The older female workers are located on the exterior; in the interior are the younger female workers. At the smallest disturbance, soldiers gather on the top surface of the bivouac, ready to defend the nest with powerful mandibles and (in the case of the Ecitoninae) stingers. Inside the nest, there are numerous passages that have 'chambers' of food, larvae, eggs, and most importantly, the queen.

== Symbionts ==
Many species of army ants are widely considered to be keystone species due to their important ecological role as arthropod predators and due to their large number of vertebrate and invertebrate associates that rely on army ant colonies for nutrition or protection. During their hunt, many surface-raiding army ants are accompanied by various birds, such as antbirds, thrushes, ovenbirds and wrens, which devour the insects that are flushed out by the ants, a behavior known as kleptoparasitism. A wide variety of arthropods including staphylinid beetles, histerid beetles, spiders, silverfish, isopods, and mites also follow colonies. While some guests follow the colony emigrations on foot, many others are phoretically transported, for example by attaching themselves on army ant workers such as the histerid beetle Nymphister kronaueri. The Neotropical army ant Eciton burchellii has an estimated 350 to 500 animal associates, the most of any one species known to science.

It has been speculated that the nocturnal foraging of some army ant species is done to reduce kleptoparasitism by birds, since the bird kleptoparasites of army ants are diurnal.

== Taxonomy ==
Historically, "army ant" in the broad sense referred to various members of five different ant subfamilies. In two of these cases, the Ponerinae and Myrmicinae, only a few species and genera exhibit legionary behavior; in the other three lineages, Ecitoninae, Dorylinae, and Leptanillinae, all of the constituent species were considered to be legionary. More recently, ant classifications now recognize an additional New World subfamily, Leptanilloidinae, which also consists of obligate legionary species, so is another group now included among the army ants.

A 2003 study of thirty species (by Sean Brady of Cornell University) indicates that army ants of subfamilies Ecitoninae (South America), Dorylinae (Africa) and Aenictinae (Asia) together formed a monophyletic group, based on data from three molecular genes and one mitochondrial gene. Brady concluded that these groups are, therefore, a single lineage that evolved in the mid-Cretaceous period in Gondwana, (Note: "Because army ants are found almost everywhere, scientists postulated that they evolved many times after the break-up and dispersal of the supercontinent Gondwana just over 100 million years ago. The conventional view of the evolution of army ants needs a revision because of new data obtained by Sean Brady, a Cornell University, US, entomologist who has discovered that these ants evolved from a common ancestor."(Whitehouse 2003)) so these subfamilies are now generally united into a single subfamily Dorylinae, though this is still not universally recognized. However, the unification of these lineages means that the only subfamily that is composed solely of legionary species is Leptanillinae, as Dorylinae contains many non-legionary genera.

Accordingly, the "army ants" as presently recognized consist of legionary species in these genera:

Subfamily Dorylinae (Aenictinae, Aenictogitoninae, Cerapachyinae, Ecitoninae and Leptanilloidinae, 2014)

- Aenictus
- Asphinctanilloides
- Cheliomyrmex
- Dorylus
- Eciton
- Labidus
- Leptanilloides
- Neivamyrmex
- Nomamyrmex

Subfamily Leptanillinae

- Anomalomyrma
- Leptanilla
- Phaulomyrma
- Protanilla
- Yavnella

Subfamily Myrmicinae

- Pheidologeton

Subfamily Ponerinae

- Leptogenys (some species)
- Simopelta

Subfamily Amblyoponinae

- Onychomyrmex

== See also ==
- "Leiningen Versus the Ants" – fanciful 1938 short story by Carl Stephenson about soldier ants swarming over a Brazilian plantation
