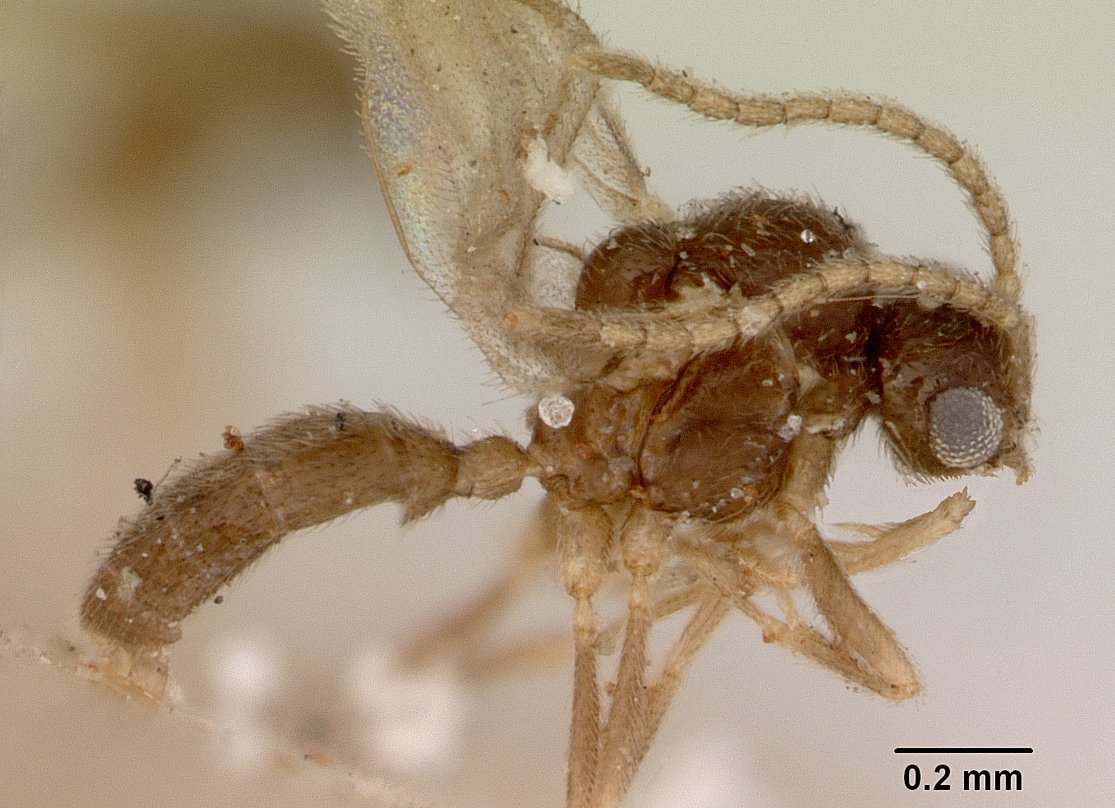
- A. golbachi male from Argentina

Scientific classification
- Kingdom: Animalia
- Phylum: Arthropoda
- Class: Insecta
- Order: Hymenoptera
- Family: Formicidae
- Subfamily: Dorylinae
- Genus: Amyrmex; Kusnezov, 1953
- Species: A. golbachi

Binomial name
- Amyrmex golbachi Kusnezov, 1953

= Amyrmex =

Amyrmex golbachi

Species of ant

Amyrmex golbachi is a rare Neotropical species of ant and the only known species in the genus Amyrmex. It is currently only known from males from the Amazon basin of Brazil and from northern Argentina.

== Taxonomy ==
The genus was established by Kusnezov (1953) for four small male ants collected in the Tucumán region of Argentina. Kusnezov recognized a single species, Amyrmex golbachi, which he placed in the subfamily Dolichoderinae, while noting peculiar features of the wing venation and abdominal morphology that introduced some uncertainty about its affinities. Since its original description, Amyrmex has received scant attention from ant taxonomists. In his generic revision of the Dolichoderinae, Shattuck (1992) synonymized Amyrmex under Forelius. Cuezzo (2000) resurrected Amyrmex, pointing out various distinctive features of morphology that do not agree with any known males of Forelius.

Phylogenetic analyses by Ward & Brady (2009) placed Amyrmex as a sister genus to Leptanilloides and a member of the subfamily Leptanilloidinae (now Dorylinae), rather than the Dolichoderinae to which it had been previously assigned. This placement is also supported by morphological traits.

== Distribution ==
The genus is currently only known from males from the Amazon basin of Brazil and from northern Argentina. No Amyrmex specimens have been reported besides the holotype, three paratypes, one additional series of males from the Kusnezov collection, and a collection of several males discovered from unidentified specimens in the Bohart Museum of Entomology, most of which were collected in malaise traps at a lowland rainforest site in Rondônia, Brazil, in 1991. The geographical distribution of Amyrmex suggests it might be a senior synonym of the sister genus Asphinctanilloides.
