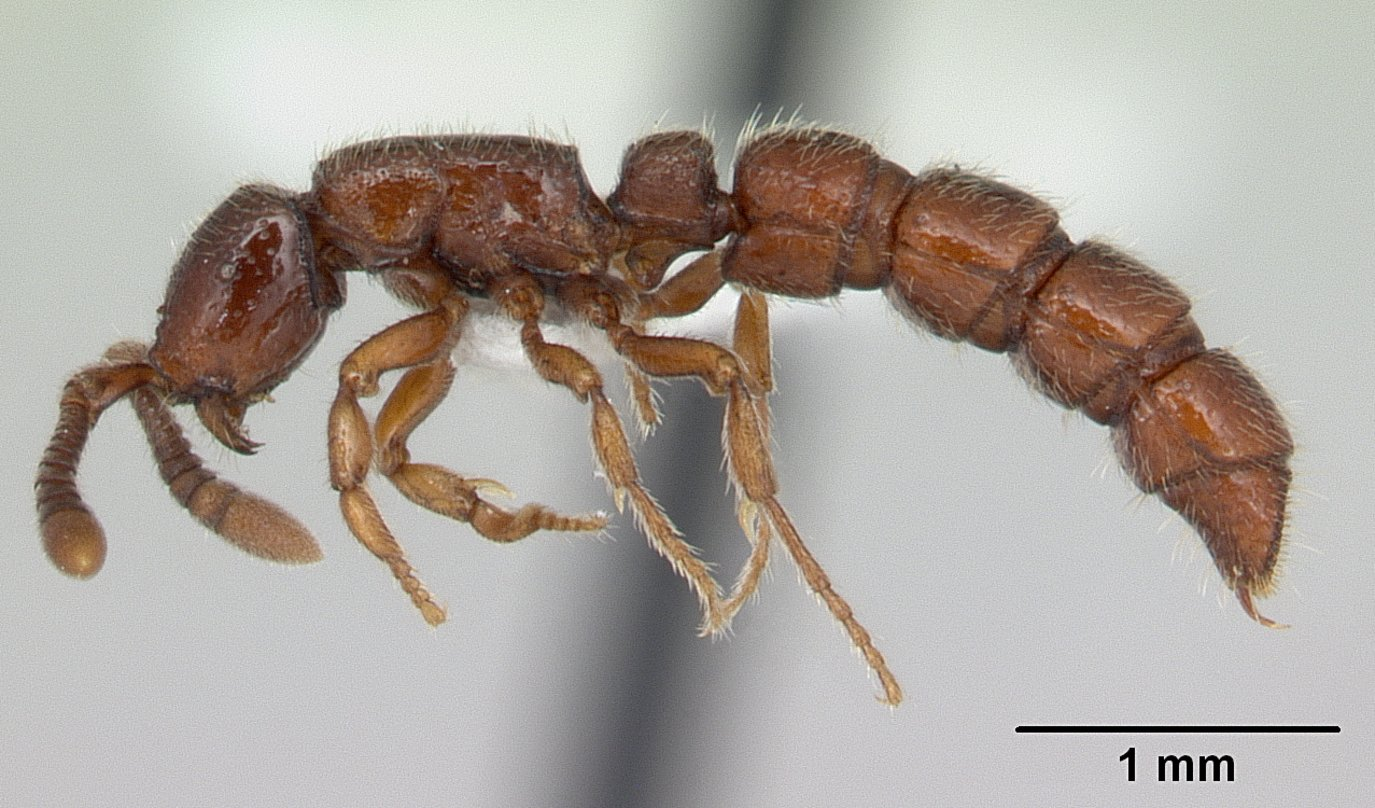
- Sphinctomyrmex stali worker from Brazil

Scientific classification
- Domain: Eukaryota
- Kingdom: Animalia
- Phylum: Arthropoda
- Class: Insecta
- Order: Hymenoptera
- Family: Formicidae
- Genus: Sphinctomyrmex
- Species: S. stali

Binomial name
- Sphinctomyrmex stali Mayr, 1866

= Sphinctomyrmex stali =

Species of ant

Sphinctomyrmex stali (named after the Swedish entomologist Carl Stål) is a Neotropical species of ants in the subfamily Dorylinae. Mayr described the genus Sphinctomyrmex with S. stali as its type species, based on a single dealate gyne. However, except for the holotype, there are no records of normal (alate) gynes for S. stali. All reproductive females collected after the original description are ergatoids.

== Distribution and habitat ==
Sphinctomyrmex stali is known from sparse localities along the southeastern portion of the Brazilian Atlantic Forest, from Santa Catarina to southern Bahia. Recent collections suggest that this species can be most commonly found in submontane forests (above 600 m) of the states of Santa Catarina and São Paulo, from whence come most of the specimens in collections.

In a single leaf-litter sample collected in São Bonifácio, Santa Catarina, six workers and two ergatoid gynes very similar to the workers, were captured, which suggests that S. stali is polygynous, as already described for other Sphinctomyrmex species.

== Description ==
The distinctly elongate head, the narrow insertion of the clypeus between the frontal lobes, the absence of lateral lobes from the anterior margin of clypeus, and the absence of appressed hairs on the dorsum of gaster separate S. stali from S. schoerederi. This species can be separated from S. marcoyi by its much larger size and the absence of a median smooth longitudinal stripe on the dorsum of mesosoma. Males are unknown.

=== Gynes ===
Two forms are recognized, alates and ergatoids. The alate form is known from a single specimen, the holotype. This gyne differs from workers by the typical characters expected for ant reproductive females: size significantly larger; ocelli well developed; compound eyes considerably large, occupying almost one third of the lateral margin of head. Pronotumis well developed, without projections; scutum large and trapezoidal; notauli shallow, almost indistinct; parapsidial lines feebly visible and convergent towards scutellum; scutoscutellar sulcus impressed; scutellum relatively narrow and set at the same level as the scutum, in lateral view; propodeum large in dorsal view, with dorsal face meeting the declivous face in a blunt angle; wings unknown. Petiole and gaster comparatively larger than in conspecific workers.

The ergatoids differ from the conspecific workers only by the presence of three equally developed ocelli and by the compound eyes being comparatively well developed.
