= Sphinctomyrmex schoerederi =

Scientific classification
- Domain: Eukaryota
- Kingdom: Animalia
- Phylum: Arthropoda
- Class: Insecta
- Order: Hymenoptera
- Family: Formicidae
- Genus: Sphinctomyrmex
- Species: S. schoerederi

Binomial name
- Sphinctomyrmex schoerederi Feitosa, Brandão, et al. 2011

Species of ant

Sphinctomyrmex schoerederi is a Neotropical species of ants in the subfamily Dorylinae. S. schoerederi is known only from the holotype, collected in a leaf litter sample from a forest remnant in the campus of Universidade Federal de Viçosa in Brazil, where it occurs in sympatry with S. stali. Gynes and males are unknown.

== Description ==
Nothing is known about its biology. This species can hardly be confounded with other congeners given the combination of subquadrate head, anterior margin of clypeus with two lateral lobes projecting over the mandibles, abdominal segments IV to VII with strongly developed pretergites, and the presence of short appressed hairs on the dorsal surface of gaster.
