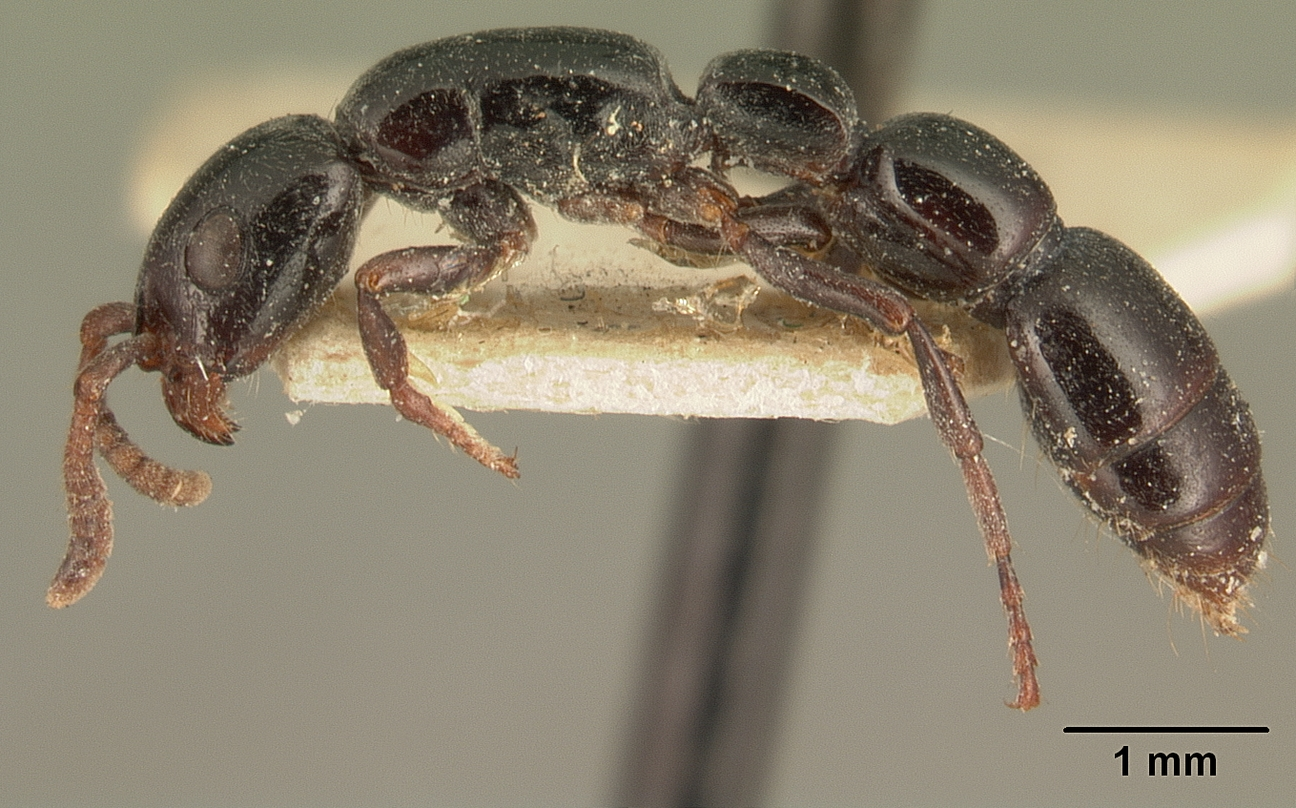
- Simopone emeryi worker from Madagascar

Scientific classification
- Domain: Eukaryota
- Kingdom: Animalia
- Phylum: Arthropoda
- Class: Insecta
- Order: Hymenoptera
- Family: Formicidae
- Subfamily: Dorylinae
- Genus: Simopone; Forel, 1891

Type species
- Simopone grandidieri Forel, 1891

Diversity
- 38 species

= Simopone =

Genus of ants

Simopone is a genus of predominantly arboreal ants in the subfamily Dorylinae. The genus is widely distributed in the Old World tropics, with the majority of species in Madagascar and sub-Saharan Africa.

== Taxonomy ==
The genus was first described by Forel (1891), based on a Simopone grandidier specimen. Brown (1975) revised the genus and recognized 13 species altogether. The number of species was raised to 15 by Kutter (1976, 1977) and to 38 by Bolton & Fisher (2012). Bolton & Fisher considered one of the African species described by Brown (1975), S. conciliatrix, so different from all the others in the genus that it is transferred to its own monotypic genus, Vicinopone.

== Description ==
Simopone species are almost entirely arboreal, but on occasion foraging workers are found on the ground or in rotten logs. Prey records are extremely sparse for this genus, consisting only of Crematogaster brood by S. vepres, and the brood of Terataner by S. sicaria. Nevertheless, these two records support the general supposition by Brown (1975) that most or all members of tribe Cerapachyini prey on other ants, or more probably the brood of other ants, but actual records are extremely rare.

Known queens are entirely worker-like except that the mesosoma has a full complement of flight sclerites. No queen recognizable by external morphology has been seen in any Malagasy species, the queens of which are suspected to be remarkably ergatoid, or perhaps even replaced by gamergates. Workers of most (perhaps all) species exhibit considerable size variation.

== Species ==
- Simopone amana Bolton & Fisher, 2012
- Simopone annettae Kutter, 1976
- Simopone bakeri Menozzi, 1926
- Simopone brunnea Bolton & Fisher, 2012
- Simopone chapmani Taylor, 1966
- Simopone conradti Emery, 1899
- Simopone consimilis Bolton & Fisher, 2012
- Simopone dignita Bolton & Fisher, 2012
- Simopone dryas Bolton & Fisher, 2012
- Simopone dux Bolton & Fisher, 2012
- Simopone elegans Bolton & Fisher, 2012
- Simopone emeryi Forel, 1892
- Simopone fera Bolton & Fisher, 2012
- Simopone fulvinodis Santschi, 1923
- Simopone grandidieri Forel, 1891
- Simopone grandis Santschi, 1923
- Simopone gressitti Taylor, 1965
- Simopone inculta Bolton & Fisher, 2012
- Simopone laevissima Arnold, 1954
- Simopone latiscapa Bolton & Fisher, 2012
- Simopone marleyi Arnold, 1915
- Simopone matthiasi Kutter, 1977
- Simopone mayri Emery, 1911
- Simopone merita Bolton & Fisher, 2012
- Simopone miniflava Bolton & Fisher, 2012
- Simopone nonnihil Bolton & Fisher, 2012
- Simopone occulta Bolton & Fisher, 2012
- Simopone oculata Radchenko, 1993
- Simopone persculpta Bolton & Fisher, 2012
- Simopone rabula Bolton & Fisher, 2012
- Simopone rex Bolton & Fisher, 2012
- Simopone schoutedeni Santschi, 1923
- Simopone sicaria Bolton & Fisher, 2012
- Simopone silens Bolton & Fisher, 2012
- Simopone trita Bolton & Fisher, 2012
- Simopone vepres Bolton & Fisher, 2012
- Simopone victrix Bolton & Fisher, 2012
- Simopone wilburi Weber, 1949
