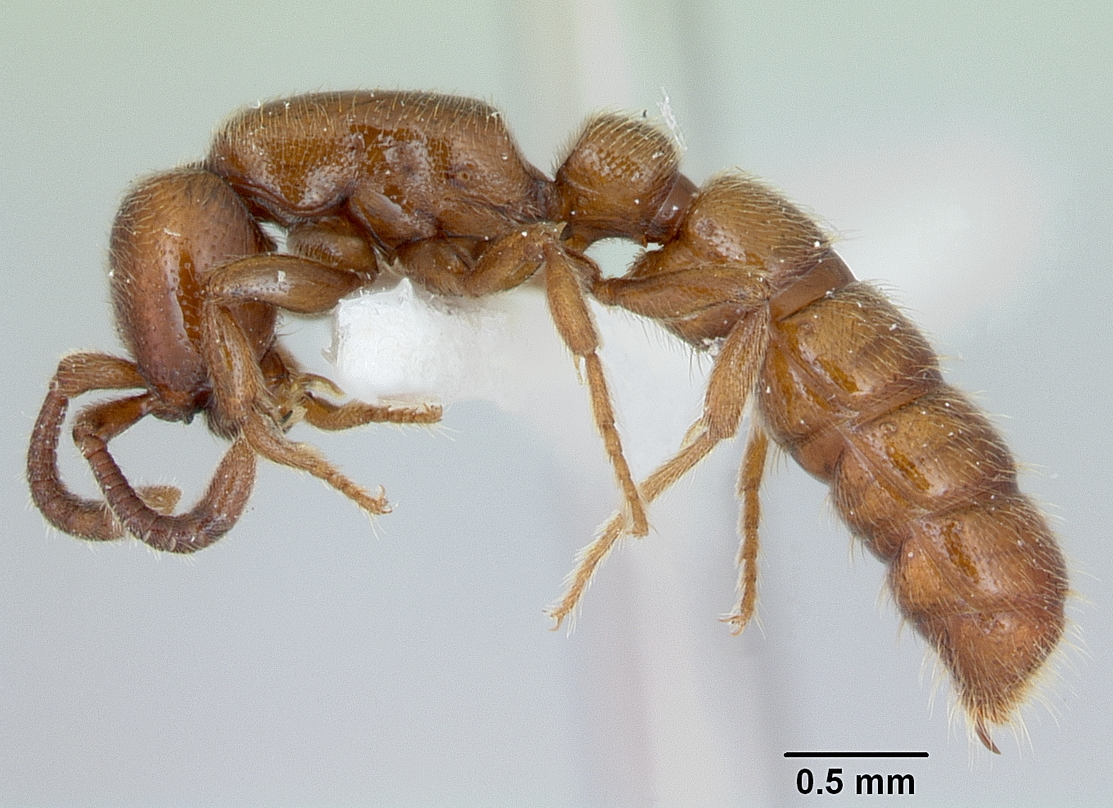
- Profile view of Zasphinctus imbecilis

Scientific classification
- Kingdom: Animalia
- Phylum: Arthropoda
- Class: Insecta
- Order: Hymenoptera
- Family: Formicidae
- Genus: Zasphinctus
- Species: Z. imbecilis

Binomial name
- Zasphinctus imbecilis (Forel, 1907)

= Zasphinctus imbecilis =

Species of ant

Zasphinctus imbecilis (formerly Sphinctomyrmex imbecilis) is a species of ant distributed in Australia. Part of the genus Zasphinctus, it was described by myrmecologist Auguste Forel in 1907. It is widely distributed in Australia, typically living under rocks. It is known for its 12-segmented antannae.

== Taxonomy ==
The species was previously a part of the genus Sphinctomyrmex. It was described by Auguste Forel in 1907.

== Distribution ==
The species is widely distributed in Australia. In Western Australia the species is restricted to areas west of the Darling Range, particularly Jarrah forests south of Perth. Its distribution is broader in eastern Australia, where it occurs in the Australian Capital Territory, New South Wales, Queensland, South Australia, and Victoria. Colonies typically nest beneath rocks, but they are also found in or under decayed wood.

== Description ==
Zasphinctus imbecilis is noted for its 12-segmented antennae. It can be identified by its shiny body surface, short antennal scapes that reach only halfway along the head capsule, and small, widely spaced hair pits limited to the head and mesosoma. Larvae of the species are slender, yellowish-white, and consisting of thirteen segments behind the head. The head is as broad as long, with vestigial antennae and elongated, weakly dentate mandibles. The body bears distinctive hairs: bifurcate on the anterior segments, whip-like on the posterior segments, and trifurcate ventrally, extending to the head. Newly hatched larvae are covered with long, simple, bristle-like hairs.
