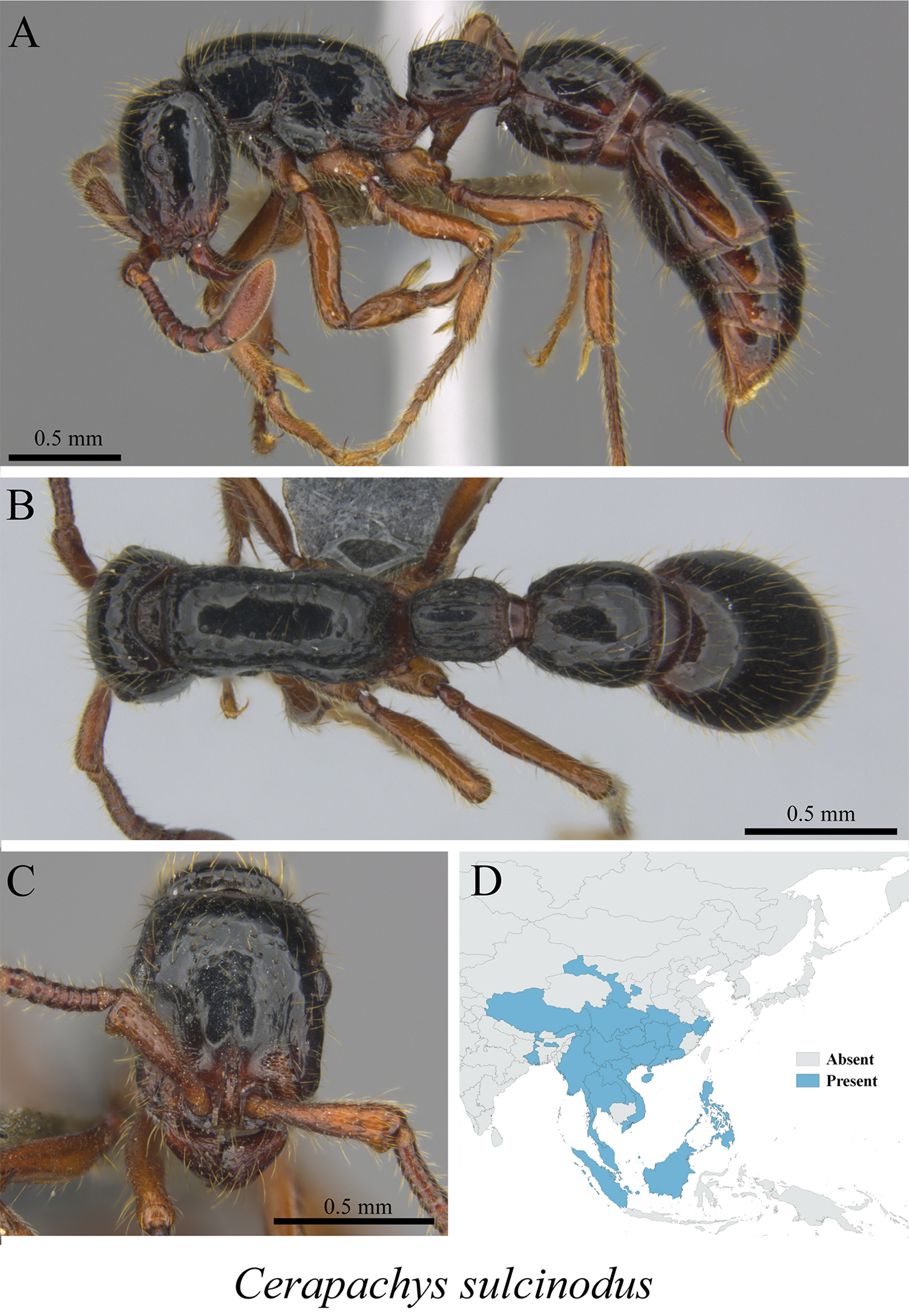

Scientific classification
- Kingdom: Animalia
- Phylum: Arthropoda
- Class: Insecta
- Order: Hymenoptera
- Family: Formicidae
- Genus: Cerapachys
- Species: C. sulcinodis

Binomial name
- Cerapachys sulcinodis Emery, 1889

Synonyms
- Cerapachys butteli Forel, 1913; Cerapachys risii Forel, 1892

= Cerapachys sulcinodis =

Species of ant

Cerapachys sulcinodis is a South and Southeast Asian species of dorlyine ant first described by Emery in 1889. Colonies comprise up to 2000 workers.

== Foraging ecology ==
Cerapachys sulcinodis is a non-army ant doryline. Workers are diurnal and forage in groups of up to 100. They attack colonies of ants and also feed on other arthropods. Foraging, and colony productivity is high in the rainy season and pauses for the dry season.
