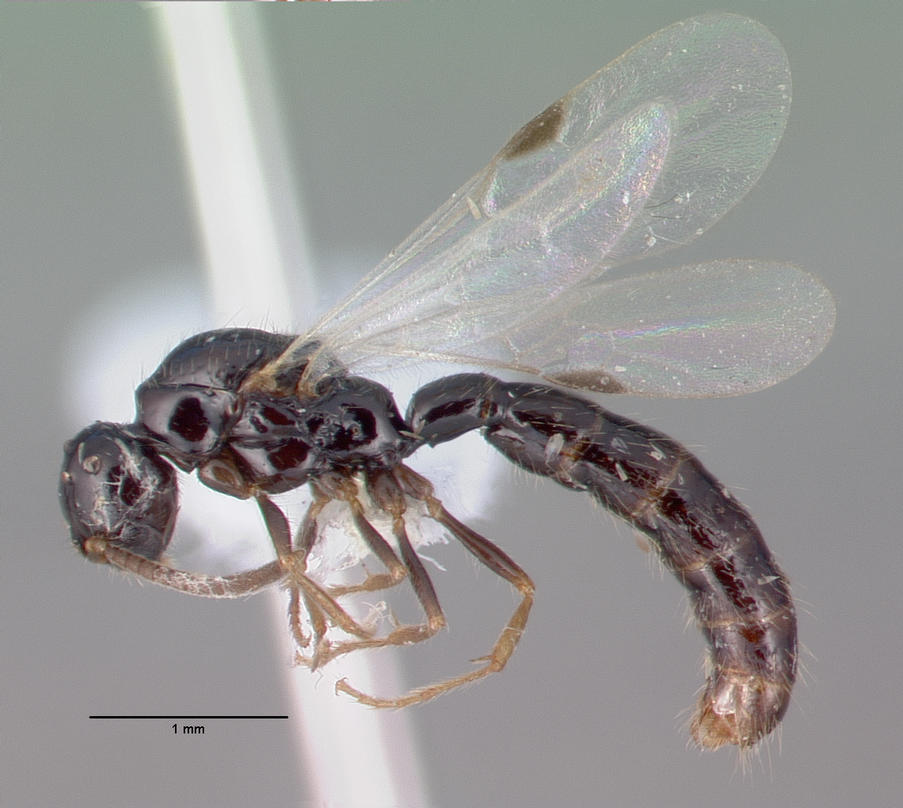

Scientific classification
- Kingdom: Animalia
- Phylum: Arthropoda
- Class: Insecta
- Order: Hymenoptera
- Family: Formicidae
- Genus: Syscia
- Species: S. augustae

Binomial name
- Syscia augustae (Wheeler, 1902)

= Syscia augustae =

Species of ant

Syscia augustae, formerly Cerapachys augustae, is a species of doryline ant in the family Formicidae.
