= FAM210B =

Protein-coding gene in the species Homo sapiens

Identifiers
- Aliases: FAM210B, 5A3, C20orf108, dJ1167H4.1, family with sequence similarity 210 member B
- External IDs: MGI: 1914267; HomoloGene: 32646; GeneCards: FAM210B; OMA:FAM210B - orthologs

Gene location (Human)
Chr.	Chromosome 20 (human)
Band	20q13.2	Start	56,358,974 bp
Band	20q13.2	End	56,368,663 bp

Gene location (Mouse)
Chr.	Chromosome 2 (mouse)
Band	2|2 H3	Start	172,187,485 bp
Band	2|2 H3	End	172,197,669 bp
RNA expression pattern
Bgee	Human / Mouse (ortholog); Top expressed in: parotid gland; trabecular bone; skin of hip; left adrenal gland; adrenal cortex; left adrenal cortex; right adrenal cortex; seminal vesicula; lactiferous duct; skin of thigh / Top expressed in: fetal liver hematopoietic progenitor cell; blood; ventricular zone; left lobe of liver; transitional epithelium of urinary bladder; gastrula; medial ganglionic eminence; Rostral migratory stream; medial dorsal nucleus; substantia nigra; More reference expression data
BioGPS	n/a
Orthologs
Species	Human	Mouse
Entrez	116151	67017
Ensembl	ENSG00000124098	ENSMUSG00000027495
UniProt	Q96KR6	Q9D8B6
RefSeq (mRNA)	NM_080821	NM_025912
RefSeq (protein)	NP_543011	NP_080188
Location (UCSC)	Chr 20: 56.36 – 56.37 Mb	Chr 2: 172.19 – 172.2 Mb
PubMed search
- Wikidata
View/Edit Human	View/Edit Mouse

FAM210B is a gene that which in Homo sapiens encodes the protein FAM210B. It has been conserved throughout evolutionary history, and is highly expressed in multiple tissues within the human body. FAM210B's primary location is the endoplasmic reticulum.

== Gene ==
=== Locus ===
FAM210B is found on the plus strand of chromosome 20, precisely at 20q13.2. This gene is 9,749 bases in length, corresponding to a 192 amino acid protein.

=== Aliases ===
Alternative names include C20orf108, Hypothetical protein LOC116151, DJ116H4.1, and 5A3.

== mRNA ==
FAM210B has 2 known splice variants, formally known as FAM210B-001 an FAM210B-002. FAM210B-001 is 3 exons in length, whereas FAM210B-002 is 2 exons.

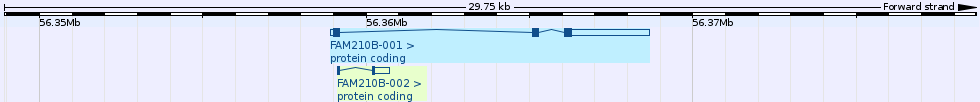

== Protein ==
The longest precursor protein is 192 amino acids in length. The molecular weight is 20.4 kdal, and isoelectric point is 10.8.

=== Structure ===
==== Primary Structure ====
There is 1 positive charge run of 4 residues at position 79, EEKK. A high scoring transmembrane sequence is present at positions 99–123, VGVSLHIGISLISLGIFYM VVSSGV. An endoplasmic reticulum retention signal (PAAK) is present at positions 187–191.

==== Secondary Structure ====
The majority of the structure is composed of alpha helices. As predicted my Phyre 2, 61% of the protein forms alpha helices, and 28% forms transmembrane segments. A detailed map of the transmembrane topology is shown below.

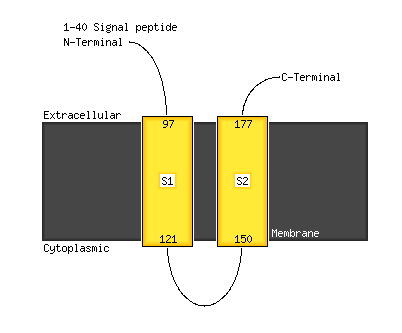

==== Tertiary Structure ====
I-Tasser predicted the folding of FAM210B to be as shown below.

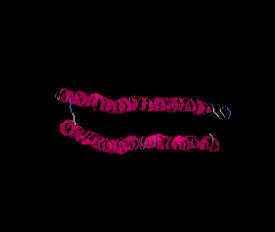
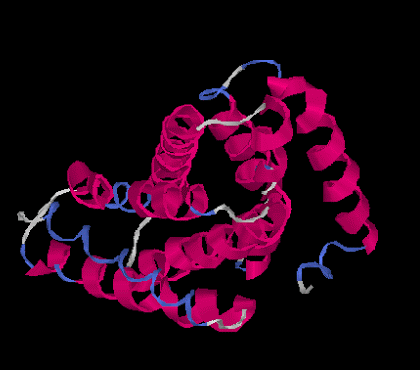

=== Subcellular Location ===
The primary location of the FAM210B protein is the endoplasmic reticulum. The amino acid sequence contains the endoplasmic retention signal PAAK near the C-terminus. There are 2 transmembrane domains, which have been determined and reaffirmed by multiple methods. They are highlighted in the post-translational modification image below.

=== Post-Translational Modifications ===
The following conceptual translation presents expected post-translational modifications. The modifications were predicted by MotifScan, and then searched in greater detail in Expasy Modifications found include propeptide cleavage sites, C-mannosylation sites, GalNAc O-glycosylation sites, lysine glycation sites, phosphorylation sites, a Coronavirus 3C-like proteinase cleavage site, and a GPI modification site.

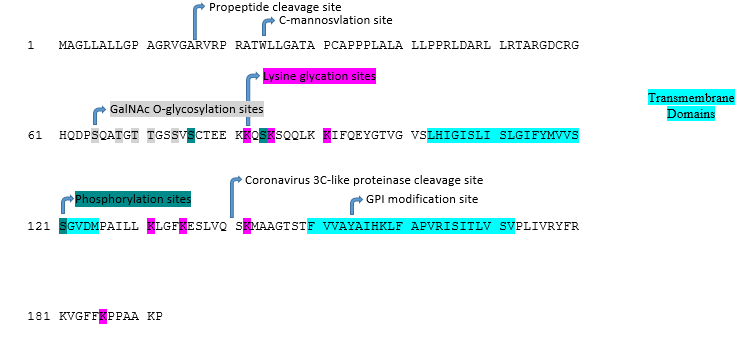

== Homology ==
An important paralog for FAM210B is FAM210A. Orthologs and distant homologs have been found throughout mammalia, reptiles, birds, invertebrates, fish, amphibian, trichoplax, and fungi.

=== Paralogs ===
Gene Name	Common name	Accession number	Sequence length	E-value	Identity	Query cover
RCE1 protein	RCE1	AAH52622.1	329	0.063	42%	28%
Serine/Threonine-protein kinase	SBK2	NP_001094871.2	348	1.3	54%	15%
FAM210A	FAM210A	NP_689565.2	272	1.4	31%	53%

=== Orthologs ===
Genus and species	Common name	Date of divergence (MYA)	Accession number	Sequence length	E-value	Identity	Query cover	Notes
Homo sapiens	Human	-	NP_543011.2	192	2.00E-138	100%	100%	Mammal
Tarsius syrichta	Philippine tarsier	67.6	XP_008058424.1	150	3.00E-88	88%	76%	Mammal
Fukomys damarensis	Damaraland mole-rat	90.9	XP_010627139.1	184	1.00E-77	82%	76%	Mammal
Orninus orca	Killer whale	97.5	XP_004282340.1	192	2.00E-98	81%	100%	Mammal
Camelus ferus	Bactrian camel	97.5	EPY80008.1	251	7.00E-72	87%	69%	Mammal
Anolis carolinensis	Carolina anole	320.5	XP_003223790.1	215	4.00E-60	65%	78%	Reptile
Thamnophis sirtalis	Common garter snake	320.5	XP_013919769.1	286	3.00E-59	67%	71%	Reptile
Ophiophagus hannah	King cobra	320.5	ETE65490.1	152	8.00E-59	68%	67%	Reptile
Cariama cristata	Reg-legged seriema	320.5	KRP59646.1	115	7.00E-58	78%	59%	Bird
Egretta garzetta	Little egret	320.5	KFP21403.1	115	1.00E-57	77%	59%	Bird
Anas platyrhynchos	Mallard	320.5	EOB08268.1	97	2.00E-14	44%	50%	Bird
Gekko japonicus	Gekko	320.5	XP_015277771.1	304	1.00E-11	34%	57%	Reptile
Xenopus tropicalis	Western clawed frog	355.7	NP_001072818.1	196	5.00E-57	55%	94%	Amphibian
Xenopus laevis	African clawed-frog	355.7	NP_001088884.1	275	8.00E-10	29%	53%	Amphibian
Callorhinchus milii	Australian ghostshark	482.9	XP_007910267.1	217	1.00E-48	73%	55%	Fish
Drosophila sechellia	Fruit fly	847	XP_002037687.1	135	5.00E-31	48%	71%	Invertebrate
Cerapachys biroi	Clonal raider ant	847	XP_011331931.1	344	3.00E-15	36%	56%	Invertebrate
Ogataea parapolymorpha	Microorganism	1302.5	XP_013935759.1	208	7.00E-05	29%	60%	Fungus
Populus trichocarpa	Black cottonwood	1513.9	XP_006379359.1	242	5.00E-04	33%	49%	Plant
Trichoplax adhaerens	Trichoplax	Unknown	XP_002116161.1	149	5.00E-29	40%	63%	Trichoplax
Mitosporidium daphinae	Parasite	Unknown	XP_013239484.1	162	1.00E-07	35%	48%	Fungus

== Evolutionary History ==
The size of the gene family is two, and includes FAM210A and FAM210B. Gene duplication seems to have occurred when plants diverged from protists. The most distant ortholog found was Populus trichocarpa, also known as the black cottonwood tree. The unrooted phylogenetic tree below demonstrates this divergence. All of the organisms in the tree can also be found in the ortholog table above.

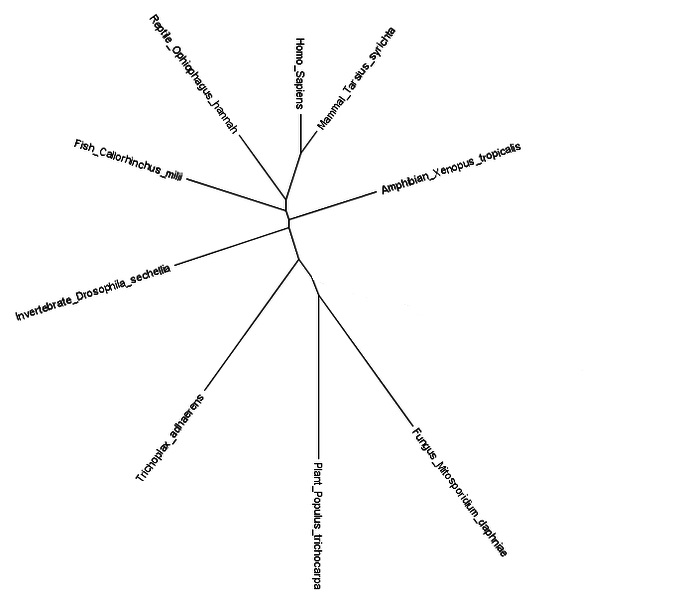

== Expression ==
FAM210B is ubiquitously expressed in Homo sapiens. It is expressed in each stage of development, and in many compromised health states including breast, cervical, liver, lung, ovarian, and pancreatic tumors.

=== Allen Brain Atlas ===
These images were taken from Allen Brain Atlas and demonstrate expression of FAM210B in the mouse brain. The images compare the expression of FAM210B (left) to dopamine beta hydroxylase (right) in a sagittal cut of the cerebellum.

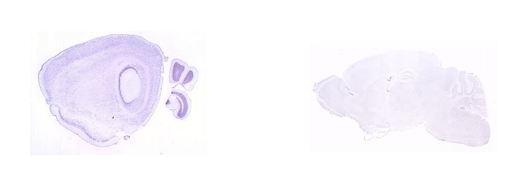

=== GEO Profiles ===
The following image contains the gene expression of FAM210B in patients with dengue fever or those who are convalescent. As seen by the blue dots, there is decreased rank of FAM210B in patients experiencing hemorrhagic fever and fever as compared to the healthy controls.

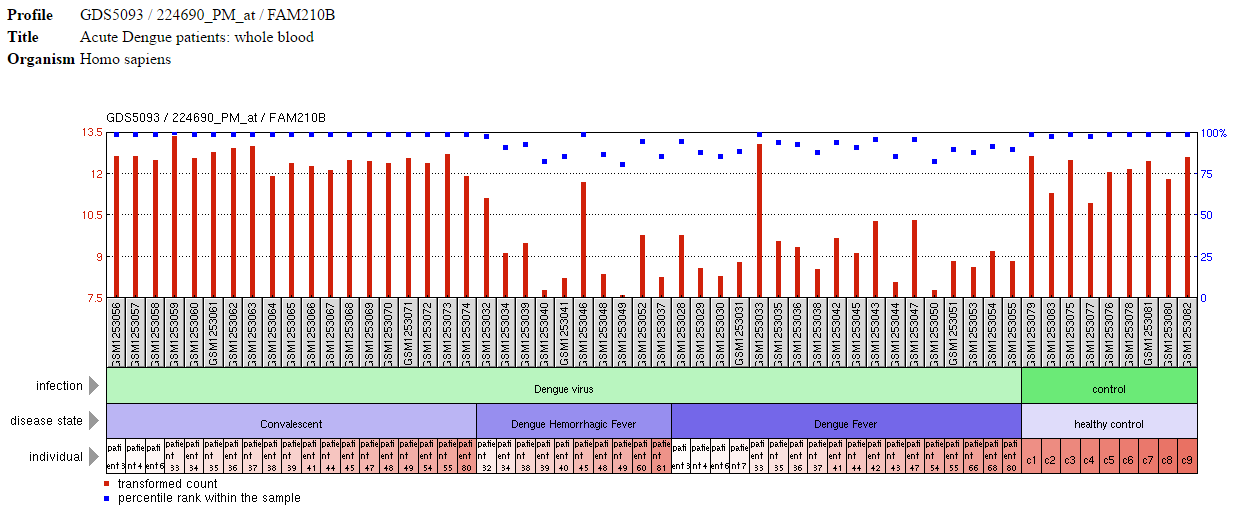

The following image contains the gene expression of FAM210B in patients with severe bacterial pneumonia, severe influenza, and those who received the influenza vaccine. As seen in the image, FAM210B is lower in rank in the patients with severe bacterial pneumonia and are even lower in those with severe influenza, as compared to those who received the influenza vaccine.

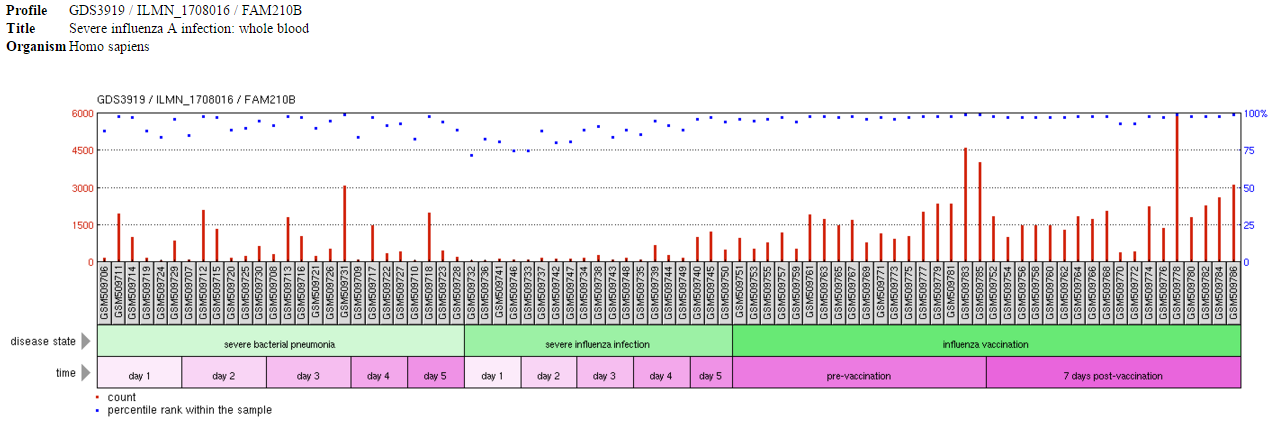

== Interacting Proteins ==
The following proteins were determined to interact with FAM210B. Their interaction was determined by affinity capture and mass spectrometric methods. By analyzing the function of these proteins, more insight can be given into the function of FAM210B.

Protein	Function
HTR2C	Encodes transmembrane G-protein-coupled receptor. Responds to signaling through serotonin.
LPAR1	Protein encoded by this gene is a LPA receptor. Mediate functions such as proliferation, platelet aggregation, smooth muscle contraction, tumor cell invasion.
REEP5	May promote functional cell surface expression of olfactory receptors.
RTN1	Reticulon encoding gene, associated with the ER and involved in neuroendocrine secretion.
RTN4	Reticulon encoding gene, associated with the ER and involved in neuroendocrine secretion.
TM4SF20	Interact with integrins to function cell adhesion, proliferation, and motility.
TSPAN5	Mediate signal transduction events that regulate cell development, activation, growth, and motility.
TSPAN17	Encodes member of transmembrane 4 superfamily, function is undetermined.
ATP6V0D1	Encodes V-ATPase that mediates acidification of eukaryotic intracellular organelles.
