= Lioponera elegans =

Scientific classification
- Kingdom: Animalia
- Phylum: Arthropoda
- Class: Insecta
- Order: Hymenoptera
- Family: Formicidae
- Genus: Lioponera
- Species: L. elegans

Binomial name
- Lioponera elegans (Wheeler, 1918)

Synonyms
- Cerapachys elegans (Wheeler, 1918); Phyracaces elegans Wheeler, 1918

Species of ant

Lioponera elegans, formerly Cerapachys elegans, is an dorline ant species found in Australia.
