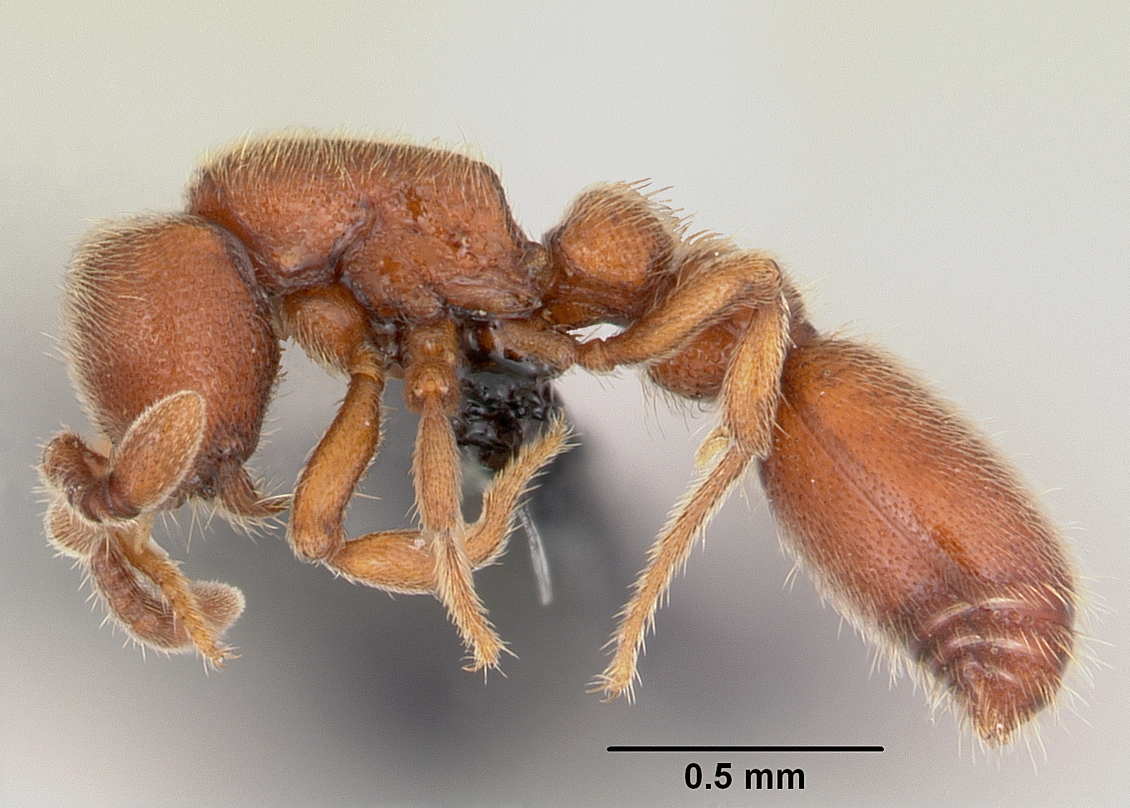
- Pinned Ooceraea biroi worker

Scientific classification
- Kingdom: Animalia
- Phylum: Arthropoda
- Class: Insecta
- Order: Hymenoptera
- Family: Formicidae
- Genus: Ooceraea
- Species: O. biroi

Binomial name
- Ooceraea biroi (Forel, 1907)

Synonyms
- Cerapachys (Syscia) biroi Forel, 1907; Ooceraea ierensis (Weber, 1939); Ooceraea seini (Mann, 1931); Ooceraea silvestrii (Wheeler, 1909); Ooceraea sinensis (Wheeler, 1928)

= Ooceraea biroi =

Species of ant

Ooceraea biroi, the clonal raider ant, is a queenless clonal ant in the genus Ooceraea (recently transferred from the genus Cerapachys). Native to the Asian mainland, this species has become invasive on tropical and subtropical islands throughout the world. Unlike most ants, which have reproductive queens and mostly nonreproductive workers, all individuals in a O. biroi colony reproduce clonally via thelytokous parthenogenesis. Like most dorylines, O. biroi are obligate myrmecophages and raid nests of other ant species to feed on the brood.

== Description ==
Clonal raider ants are small, about 2 mm long, but relatively stocky. Like many former cerapachyines, O. biroi is heavily armored, with the short, thick antennae that give the old subfamily its name (from Greek, keras/κέρας, meaning horn and pachys/παχυς, meaning thick). The other defining characteristic of the former Cerapachyinae, a row of teeth over the pygidium (last visible abdominal segment), is very small in O. biroi and difficult to see. O. biroi can be distinguished from many other former cerapachyines by combining highly reduced or nonexistent eyes, a rectangular head, and a distinct postpetiole.

== Cyclic life history ==
Like many myrmecophagous ants, O. biroi exhibits synchronized oviposition and cyclic behavior, shifting between a reproductive phase and a foraging phase. The reproductive phase begins when a cohort of larvae pupate and all the adults in the colony activate their ovaries. Thelytokously produced eggs are then laid synchronously after about four days and develop for roughly 10 days while the adults remain within the nest, cleaning and tending the eggs and pupae. Eggs hatch roughly two weeks into the reproductive phase, and then a few days later, the foraging phase begins with the emergence of new adults from the pupae. Adults forage for the next two weeks, raiding the nests of other ant species to bring back food for the larvae. The cycle completes with the pupation of the new larval cohort and the resumption of the reproductive phase.

== Genetics and genomics ==
The effects of central fusion and terminal fusion on heterozygosity

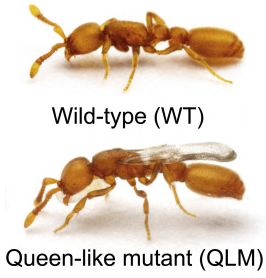
Clonal raider ant phenotype for a supergene on chromosome 13 presenting as the normal heterozygous wild type and the queen-like mutant.

Parthenogenesis is a natural form of reproduction in which growth and development of embryos occur without fertilisation. Thelytoky is a particular form of parthenogenesis in which the development of a female individual occurs from an unfertilized egg. Automixis is a form of thelytoky, but different kinds are seen. The kind of automixis relevant here is one in which two haploid products from the same meiosis combine to form a diploid zygote. Because O. biroi can be very easily maintained in laboratory conditions, it has attracted attention as a potential model organism for studying the molecular biology of sociality. Laboratory maintenance is made easy by the clonality of the species; a few individuals placed in an airtight box and given ant brood as food can be grown up into many large colonies. Clonal reproduction is achieved by automixis with central fusion (see diagram), as is common in the Hymenoptera, yet unlike most clonal Hymenoptera, loss of heterozygosity is extraordinarily slow. The upshot of this is that offspring are almost genetically identical to the parent, allowing nearly complete control over the genotype of experimental subjects. Finally, since O. biroi colonies are queenless and all workers reproduce, generation time is about two months (the developmental time of a single individual), rather than many years as is the case for most ant species.

It has been also reported that clonal raider ants have a supergene on their 13 chromosome which normally is present heterozygotically and only expressed in homozygous clonal raiders which will possess more queen-like characteristics such having small wing buds, laying twice as many eggs and engaging in social parasitism where the care of their eggs is left to the heterozygous workers.
