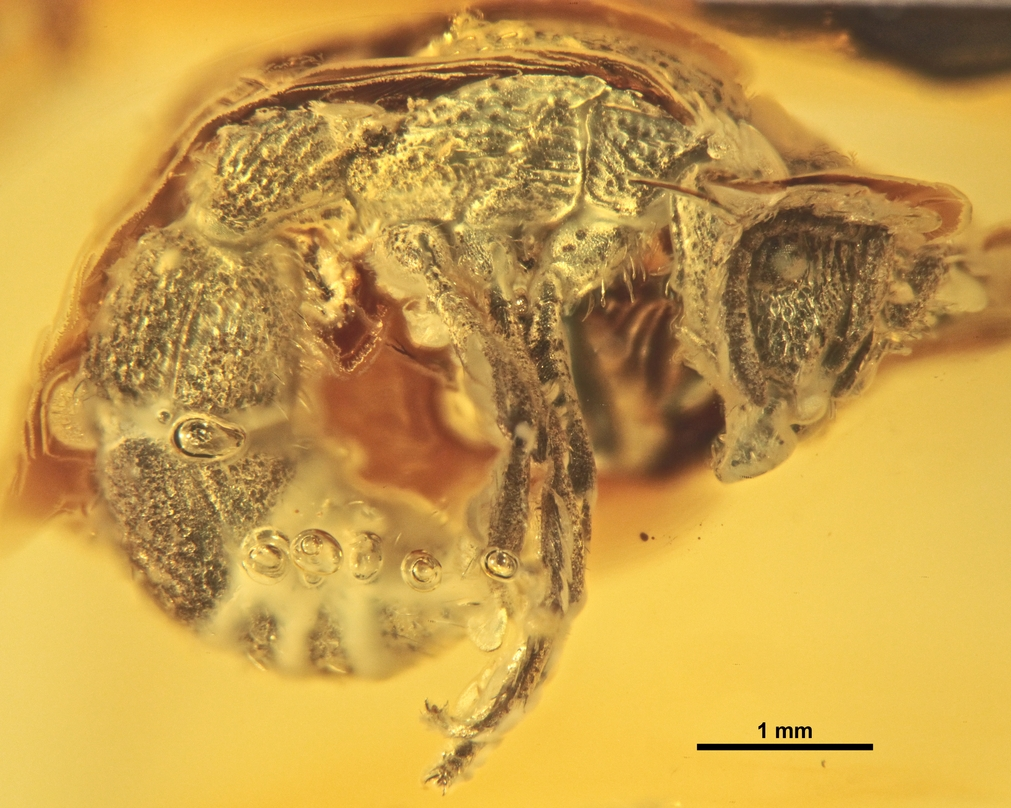
- Procerapachys annosus

Scientific classification
- Domain: Eukaryota
- Kingdom: Animalia
- Phylum: Arthropoda
- Class: Insecta
- Order: Hymenoptera
- Family: Formicidae
- Subfamily: Dorylinae
- Genus: †Procerapachys; Wheeler, 1915

Type species
- Procerapachys annosus

Species
- P. annosus Wheeler, 1915; P. favosus Wheeler, 1915; P. sulcatus Dlussky, 2009

= Procerapachys =

Procerapachys Temporal range: Middle to Late Eocene, 42–37 Ma

Genus of ants

Procerapachys is an extinct genus of ants which existed 37 to 42 million years ago. A member of the subfamily Dorylinae of the family Formicidae, Procerapachys was first described by American entomologist William Morton Wheeler in 1915.
