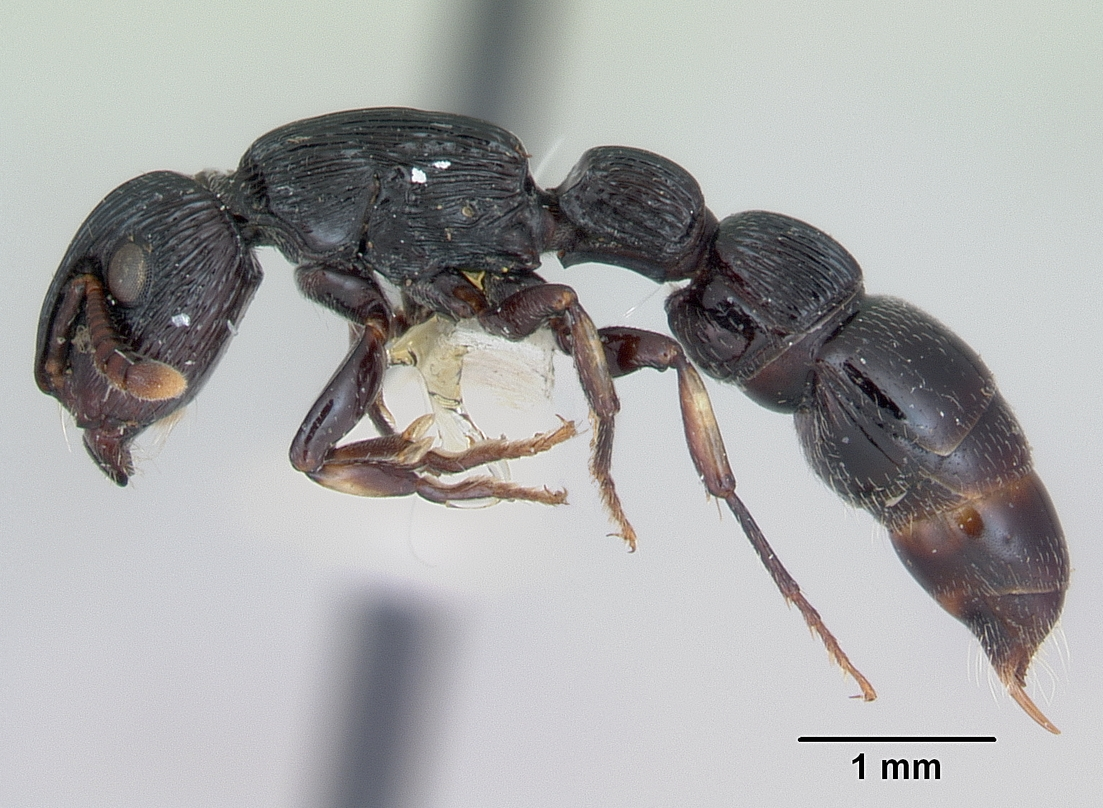
- Cylindromyrmex whymperi worker form Isabela Island, Galápagos

Scientific classification
- Kingdom: Animalia
- Phylum: Arthropoda
- Class: Insecta
- Order: Hymenoptera
- Family: Formicidae
- Subfamily: Dorylinae
- Genus: Cylindromyrmex; Mayr, 1870

Type species
- Cylindromyrmex striatus Mayr, 1870

Diversity
- 13 species

Synonyms
- Holcoponera Cameron, 1891; Hypocylindromyrmex Wheeler, 1924; Metacylindromyrmex Wheeler, 1924

= Cylindromyrmex =

Genus of ants

Cylindromyrmex is a Neotropical genus of ants in the subfamily Dorylinae.

== Distribution and habitat ==
The genus is known from the New World, from Central America to Brazil, Bolivia and the Galápagos Islands, and currently contains 10 extant species and 3 fossil species. The fossil species, all described from single or a small number of specimens, were found in Dominican amber. Their nesting place include cavities of wood and even termite nests. Like their nesting habits, their feeding habits are not fully know, but they are said to be predators of termites.

== Species ==
- †Cylindromyrmex antillanus De Andrade, 1998
- Cylindromyrmex boliviae Wheeler, 1924
- Cylindromyrmex brasiliensis Emery, 1901
- Cylindromyrmex brevitarsus Santschi, 1925
- Cylindromyrmex darlingtoni Wheeler, 1937
- †Cylindromyrmex electrinus De Andrade, 1998
- Cylindromyrmex escobari De Andrade, 1998
- Cylindromyrmex godmani Forel, 1899
- †Cylindromyrmex inopinatus De Andrade, 2001
- Cylindromyrmex longiceps André, 1892
- Cylindromyrmex meinerti Forel, 1905
- Cylindromyrmex striatus Mayr, 1870
- Cylindromyrmex whymperi (Cameron, 1891)
