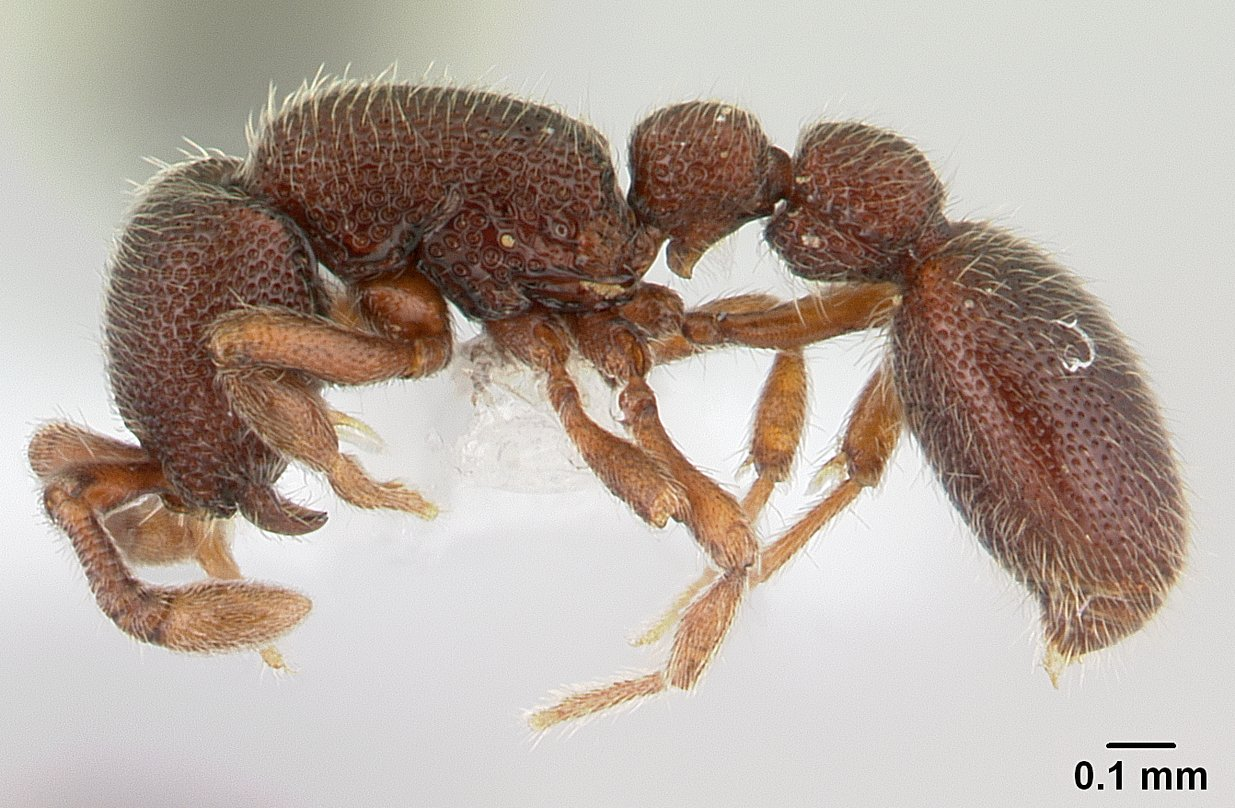

Scientific classification
- Kingdom: Animalia
- Phylum: Arthropoda
- Clade: Pancrustacea
- Class: Insecta
- Order: Hymenoptera
- Family: Formicidae
- Genus: Ooceraea
- Species: O. fragosa

Binomial name
- Ooceraea fragosa Roger, 1862

Synonyms
- Cerapachys fragosus

= Ooceraea fragosa =

Species of ant

Ooceraea fragosa is a species of reddish-brown army ant that is found in Sri Lanka, and the type species for the genus Ooceraea.
