= Eburopone =

Scientific classification
- Kingdom: Animalia
- Phylum: Arthropoda
- Class: Insecta
- Order: Hymenoptera
- Family: Formicidae
- Subfamily: Dorylinae
- Genus: Eburopone; Borowiec, 2016

Genus of ants

Eburopone is a genus of ants belonging to the subfamily Dorylinae.

The species of this genus are found in Africa and Vietnam.

== Species ==
Species:

- Eburopone easoana Yamada et al., 2023
- Eburopone wroughtoni (Forel, 1910)
