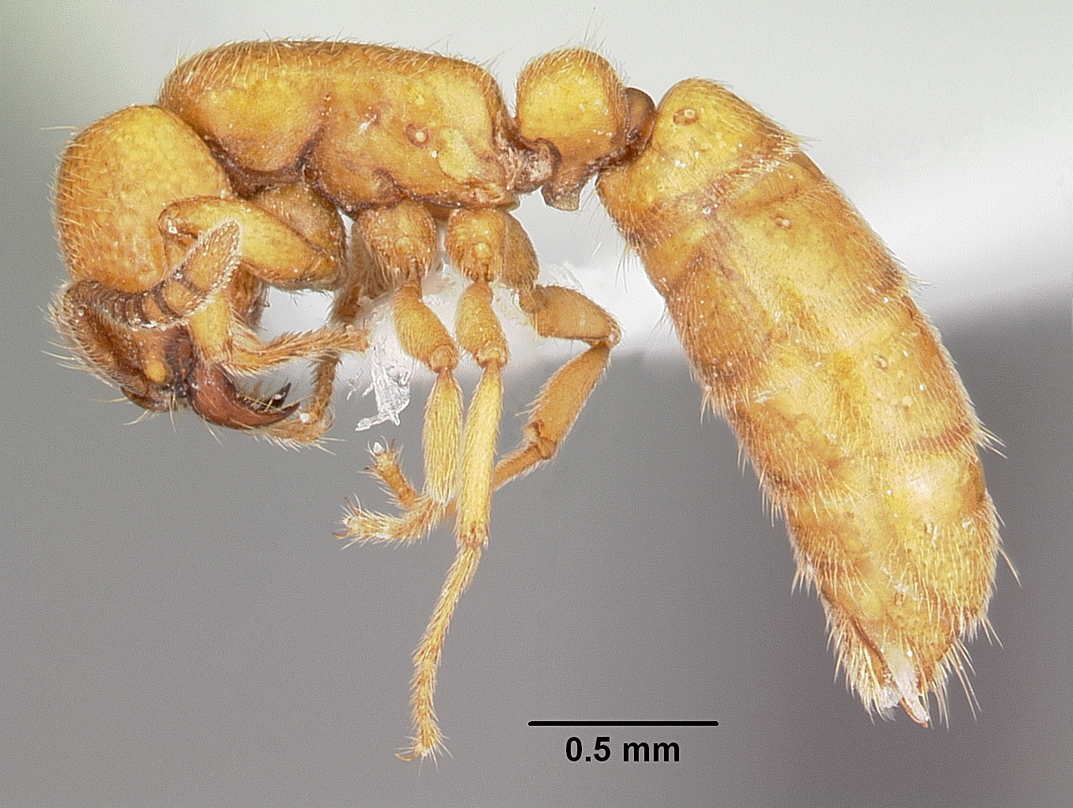
- Yunodorylus sexspinus lateral
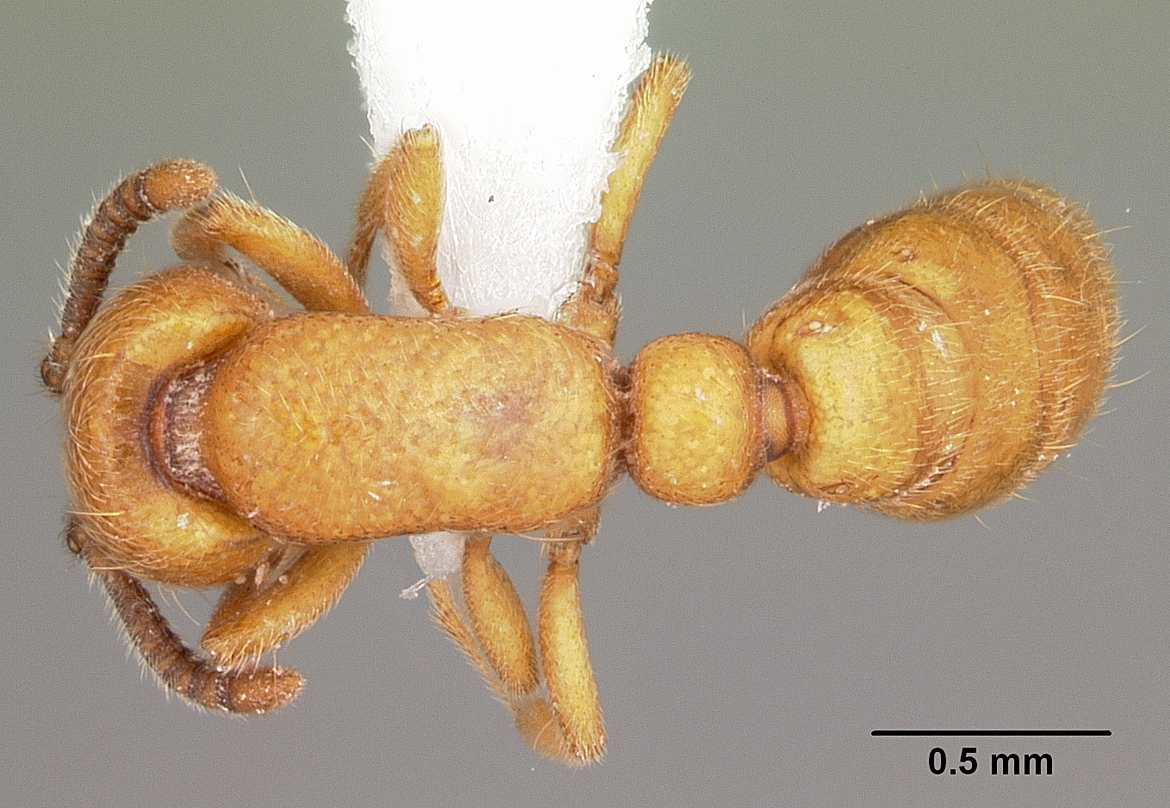
- Yunodorylus sexspinus dorsal

Scientific classification
- Domain: Eukaryota
- Kingdom: Animalia
- Phylum: Arthropoda
- Class: Insecta
- Order: Hymenoptera
- Family: Formicidae
- Subfamily: Dorylinae
- Genus: Yunodorylus; Xu, 2000

Type species
- Yunodorylus antennatus Xu, 2000

Diversity
- 4 species

= Yunodorylus =

Genus of ants

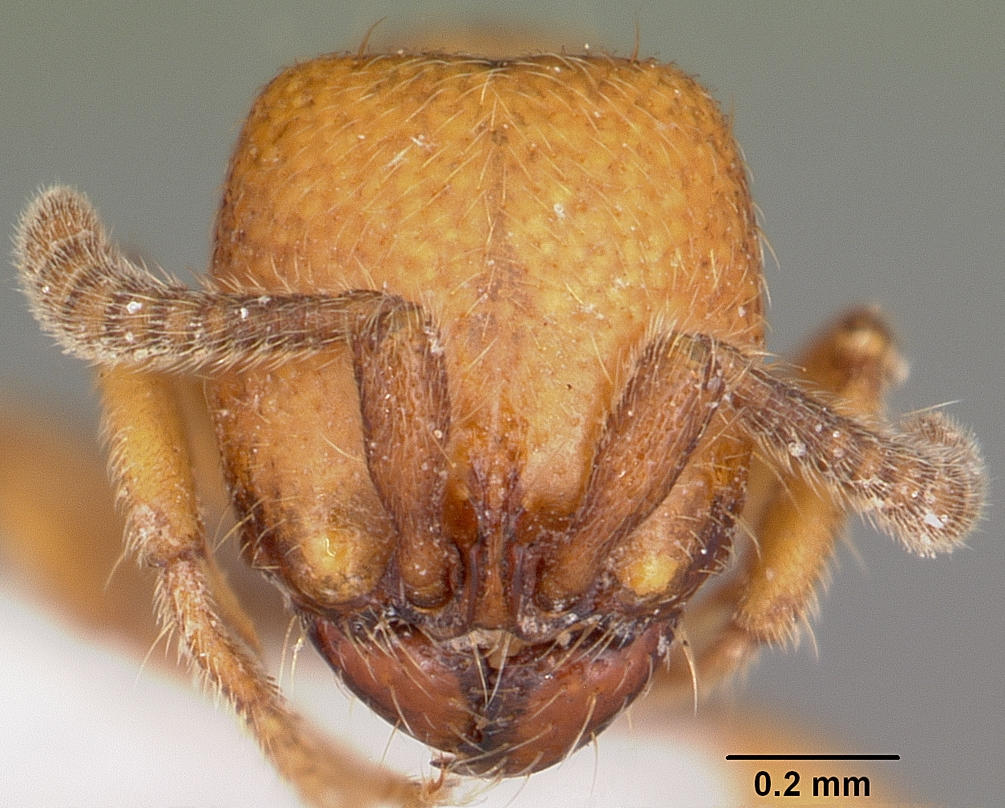
Yunodorylus sexspinus head

Yunodorylus is a genus of ants in the subfamily Dorylinae containing four described species. The genus is distributed widely across mainland Southeast Asia and the island of Borneo. Yunodorylus was described in 2000, later placed as a junior synonym of Cerapachys by Bolton (2003), and was resurrected as a valid genus by Borowiec (2016)

== Species ==
- Yunodorylus doryloides (Borowiec, 2009)
- Yunodorylus eguchii (Borowiec, 2009)
- Yunodorylus paradoxus (Borowiec, 2009)
- Yunodorylus sexspinus Xu, 2000
