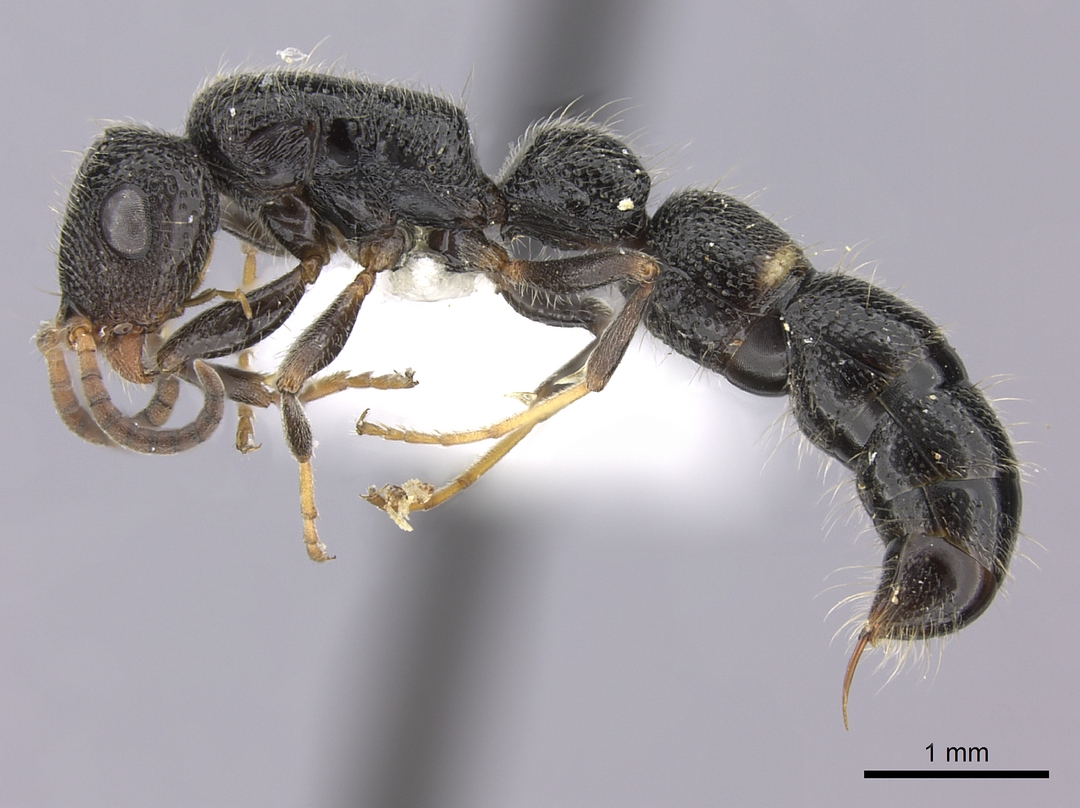
- Tanipone hirsuta

Scientific classification
- Kingdom: Animalia
- Phylum: Arthropoda
- Class: Insecta
- Order: Hymenoptera
- Family: Formicidae
- Subfamily: Dorylinae
- Genus: Tanipone; Bolton & Fisher, 2012

Type species
- Tanipone hirsuta Bolton & Fisher, 2012

Diversity
- 10 species

= Tanipone =

Genus of ants

Tanipone is a Malagasy genus of ants in the subfamily Dorylinae.

== Distribution ==
Endemic to Madagascar, species of Tanipone are predominantly terrestrial to subarboreal, being found as ground foragers in leaf litter, under stones, in rotten stumps and in rotten logs. Just as commonly workers have been captured on low vegetation, in living and dead stems above the ground and in rot pockets in tree trunks.

== Species ==
- Tanipone aglandula Bolton & Fisher, 2012
- Tanipone aversa Bolton & Fisher, 2012
- Tanipone cognata Bolton & Fisher, 2012
- Tanipone hirsuta Bolton & Fisher, 2012
- Tanipone maculata Bolton & Fisher, 2012
- Tanipone pilosa Bolton & Fisher, 2012
- Tanipone scelesta Bolton & Fisher, 2012
- Tanipone subpilosa Bolton & Fisher, 2012
- Tanipone varia Bolton & Fisher, 2012
- Tanipone zona Bolton & Fisher, 2012
