= Ooceraea coeca =

Scientific classification
- Kingdom: Animalia
- Phylum: Arthropoda
- Clade: Pancrustacea
- Class: Insecta
- Order: Hymenoptera
- Family: Formicidae
- Genus: Ooceraea
- Species: O. coeca

Binomial name
- Ooceraea coeca Mayr, 1897

Synonyms
- Cerapachys coecus

Species of ant

Ooceraea coeca is a species of reddish-brown army ant found in Sri Lanka.
