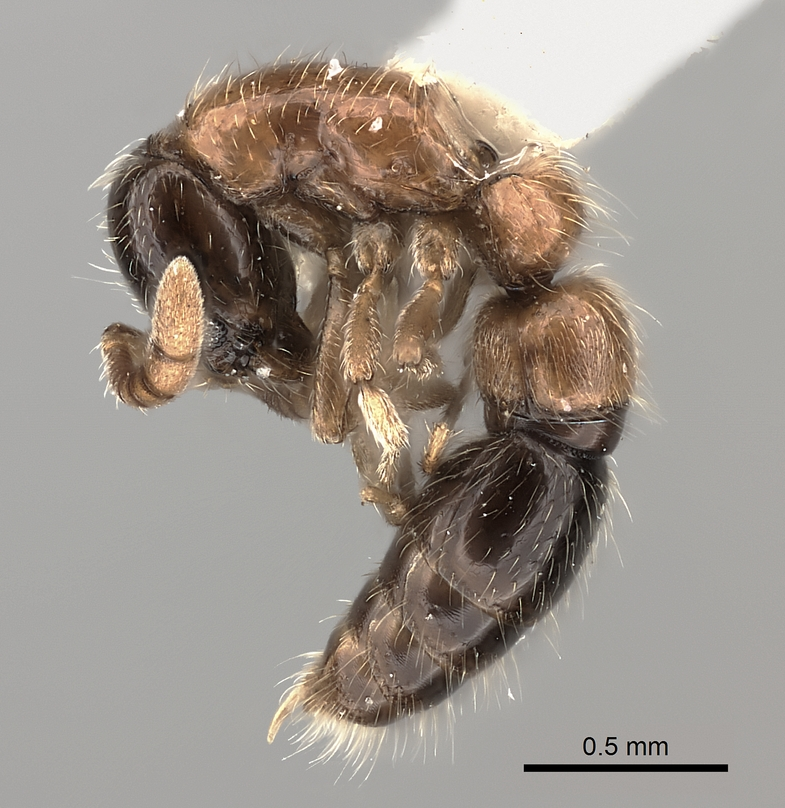
- Lioponera longitarsus worker

Scientific classification
- Domain: Eukaryota
- Kingdom: Animalia
- Phylum: Arthropoda
- Class: Insecta
- Order: Hymenoptera
- Family: Formicidae
- Subfamily: Dorylinae
- Genus: Lioponera; Mayr, 1879

Type species
- Lioponera longitarsus Mayr, 1879

Diversity
- 76 species

= Lioponera =

Genus of ants

Lioponera is a genus of ants in the subfamily Dorylinae containing approximately 74 described species. The genus is distributed widely across the Afrotropical, Australasia, Indomalaya, Malagasy, and Palearctic bioregions. Lioponera was described by Mayr (1879) and later placed as a junior synonym of Cerapachys by Brown (1975). Lioponera was resurrected as a valid genus by Borowiec (2016) during redescription of the doryline genera.

== Species ==
- Lioponera costatus (Bharti & Wachkoo, 2013)
- Lioponera aberrans (Clark, 1934)
- Lioponera adama Forel, 1910
- Lioponera augustae Wheeler, 1902
- Lioponera anokha (Bharti & Akbar, 2013)
- Lioponera bakeri (Wheeler & Chapman, 1925)
- Lioponera bicolor (Clark, 1924)
- Lioponera binodis Forel, 1910
- Lioponera bispinata (Chen et al., 2016)
- Lioponera braunsi (Emery, 1902)
- Lioponera braytoni (Weber, 1949)
- Lioponera brevicollis (Clark, 1924)
- Lioponera brevis (Clark, 1924)
- Lioponera clara (Clark, 1930)
- Lioponera clarki (Crawley, 1922)
- Lioponera cohici (Wilson, 1957)
- Lioponera collingwoodi Sharaf, 2007
- Lioponera constricta (Clark, 1924)
- Lioponera coxalis (Arnold, 1926)
- Lioponera crassa (Clark, 1941)
- Lioponera daikoku Terayama, 1996
- Lioponera decorsei Santschi, 1912
- Lioponera desertorum (Dlussky, 1990)
- Lioponera dumbletoni (Wilson, 1957)
- Lioponera elegans (Wheeler, 1918)
- Lioponera emeryi (Viehmeyer, 1914)
- Lioponera fervida (Wheeler, 1918)
- Lioponera ficosa (Wheeler, 1918)
- Lioponera flammea (Clark, 1930)
- Lioponera foreli (Santschi, 1914)
- Lioponera gilesi (Clark, 1924)
- Lioponera grandis (Clark, 1934)
- Lioponera greavesi (Clark, 1934)
- Lioponera gwynethae (Clark, 1941)
- Lioponera heros (Wheeler, 1918)
- Lioponera hewitti (Wheeler, 1919)
- Lioponera huode (Terayama, 2009)
- Lioponera inconspicua (Clark, 1924)
- Lioponera iovis Forel, 1915
- Lioponera kraepelinii (Forel, 1895)
- Lioponera krombeini (Donisthorpe, 1947)
- Lioponera larvata (Wheeler, 1918)
- Lioponera longitarsus Mayr, 1879
- Lioponera luzuriagae Wheeler & Chapman, 1925
- Lioponera macrops (Clark, 1941)
- Lioponera marginata (Emery, 1897)
- Lioponera mayri (Forel, 1892)
- Lioponera mjoebergi (Forel, 1915)
- Lioponera mullewana (Wheeler, 1918)
- Lioponera nayana (Bharti & Akbar, 2013)
- Lioponera neocaledonica Jouault et al., 2019
- Lioponera nigra Santschi, 1914
- Lioponera nigriventris (Clark, 1924)
- Lioponera nkomoensis (Forel, 1916)
- Lioponera noctambula Santschi, 1910
- Lioponera parva Forel, 1900
- Lioponera picipes (Clark, 1924)
- Lioponera picta (Clark, 1934)
- Lioponera piliventris (Clark, 1941)
- Lioponera potteri (Clark, 1941)
- Lioponera pruinosa (Brown, 1975)
- Lioponera pubescens (Emery, 1902)
- Lioponera punctatissima (Clark, 1924)
- Lioponera reticulata (Clark, 1926)
- Lioponera ruficornis (Clark, 1924)
- Lioponera rugulinodis (Wheeler, 1918)
- Lioponera senescens (Wheeler, 1918)
- Lioponera similis Santschi, 1930
- Lioponera simmonsae (Clark, 1924)
- Lioponera singaporensis (Viehmeyer, 1916)
- Lioponera singularis (Forel, 1900)
- Lioponera sjostedti (Forel, 1915)
- Lioponera suscitata (Viehmeyer, 1913)
- Lioponera turneri (Forel, 1902)
- Lioponera varians (Clark, 1924)
- Lioponera versicolor (Donisthorpe, 1948)
- Lioponera vespula (Weber, 1949)
