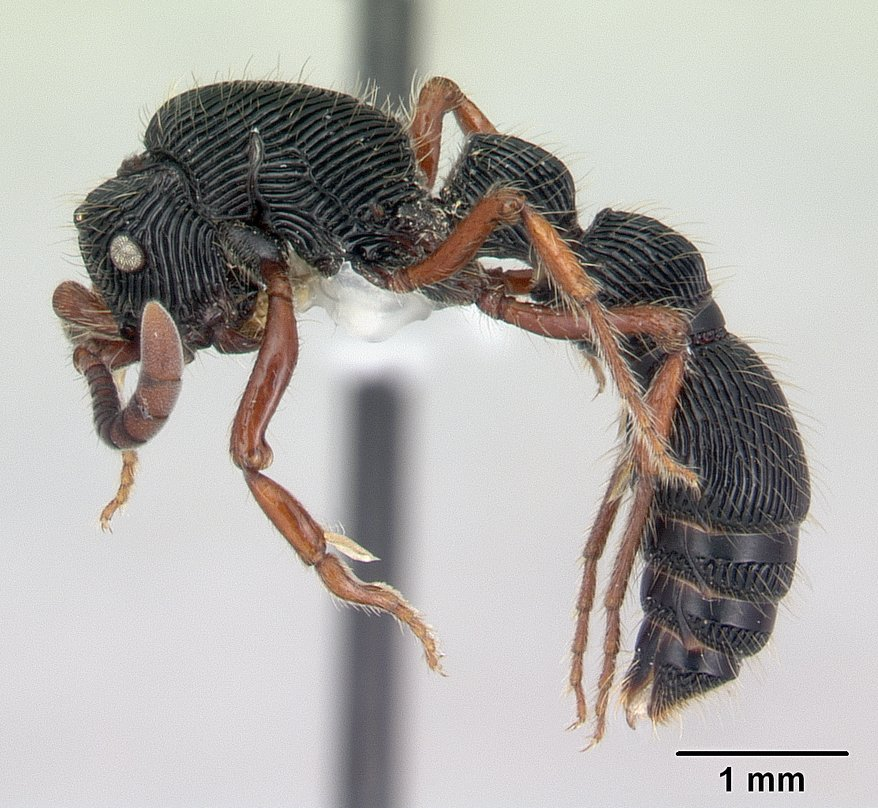
- C. crawleyi worker

Scientific classification
- Kingdom: Animalia
- Phylum: Arthropoda
- Class: Insecta
- Order: Hymenoptera
- Family: Formicidae
- Subfamily: Dorylinae
- Genus: Chrysapace; Crawley, 1924

Type species
- Chrysapace jacobsoni Crawley, 1924

Diversity
- 38 species

= Chrysapace =

Chrysapace Temporal range: Priabonian–Recent Priabonian - Recent

Genus of ants

Chrysapace is a genus of ants in the subfamily Dorylinae containing four described species. The genus is distributed across the Malaysian peninsula, Indonesia, and the Philippines, with undescribed species from Madagascar and from Baltic amber Chrysapace was described by Crawley (1924) and later placed as a junior synonym of Cerapachys by Brown (1975). Chrysapace was resurrected as a valid genus by Borowiec (2016) during redescription of the doryline genera.

== Species ==
- Chrysapace costatus (Bharti & Wachkoo, 2013)
- Chrysapace jacobsoni Crawley, 1924
- Chrysapace merimbunensis Yamada & Eguchi, 2019
- Chrysapace sauteri (Forel, 1913)
