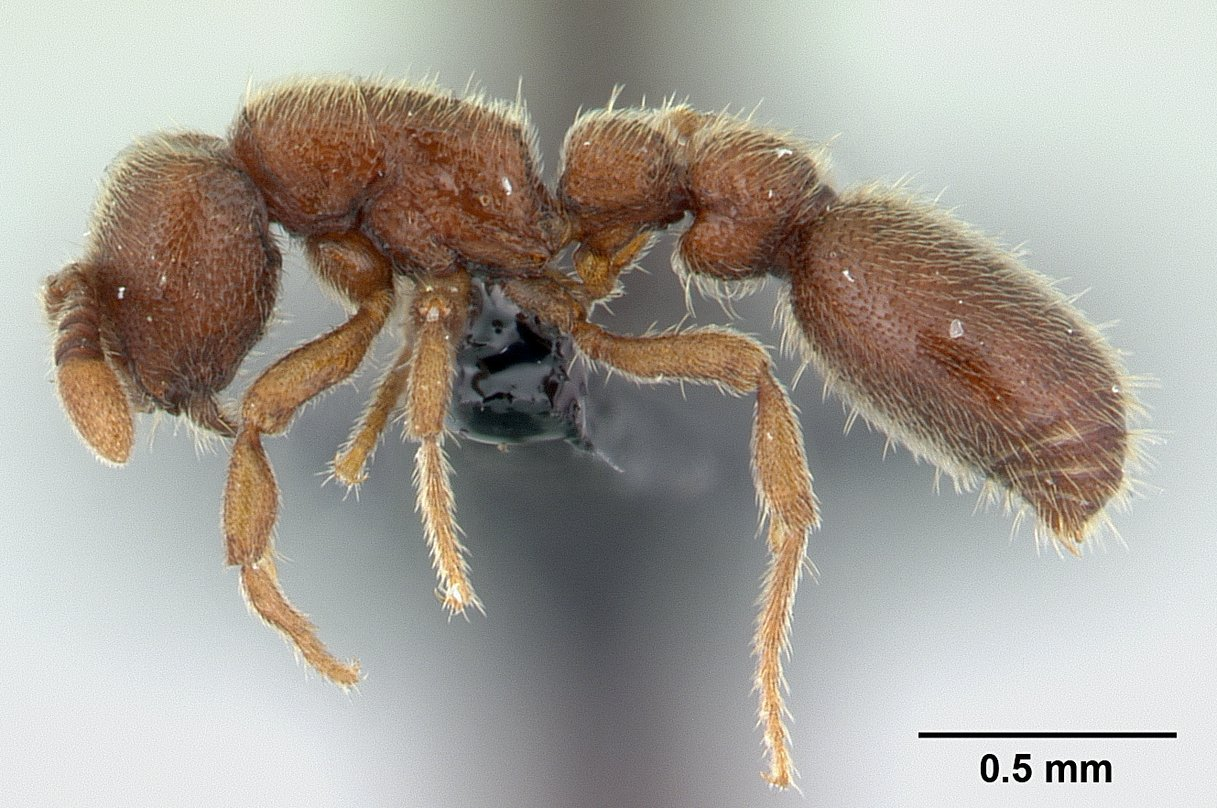
- C. biroi worker from Madagascar

Scientific classification
- Kingdom: Animalia
- Phylum: Arthropoda
- Class: Insecta
- Order: Hymenoptera
- Family: Formicidae
- Subfamily: Dorylinae
- Genus: Cerapachys; Smith, 1857

Type species
- Cerapachys antennatus

Diversity
- 5 species

Synonyms
- Ceratopachys Schulz, 1906; Cysias Emery, 1902; Neophyracaces Clark, 1941; Parasyscia Emery, 1882; Phyracaces Emery, 1902

= Cerapachys =

Genus of ants

Cerapachys (common names include "raider ant" and "ant-raiding ant") is a genus of ants in the subfamily Dorylinae. Species are mainly myrmecophagous ants which raid the nests of other ants for prey. The genus is distributed widely throughout the Indomalayan region. The genus was revised by BoroWiec (2016) who split a number of previously synonymized genera out of Cerapachys, leaving only 5 species in the genus.

== Species ==
- Cerapachys anokha (Bharti & Akbar, 2013)
- Cerapachys antennatus (Smith, 1857)
- Cerapachys aranus (Bolton, 1995)
- Cerapachys crawleyi (Wheeler, 1924)
- Cerapachys doryloides (Borowiec, M. L., 2009)
- Cerapachys edentatus (Forel, 1900)
- Cerapachys eguchii (Borowiec, M. L., 2009)
- Cerapachys iaianstewarti (Fisher, 2007)
- Cerapachys incontentus (Brown, 1975)
- Cerapachys latus (Brown, 1975)
- Cerapachys lividus (Brown, 1975)
- Cerapachys manni (Crawley, 1926)
- Cerapachys neotropicus (Weber, 1939)
- Cerapachys paradoxus (Borowiec, M. L., 2009)
- Cerapachys princeps (Clark, 1934)
- Cerapachys splendens (Borgmeier, 1957)
- Cerapachys sulcinodis (Emery, 1889)
- Cerapachys wroughtoni (Forel, 1910)
- Cerapachys xizangensis (Tang & Li, 1982)
