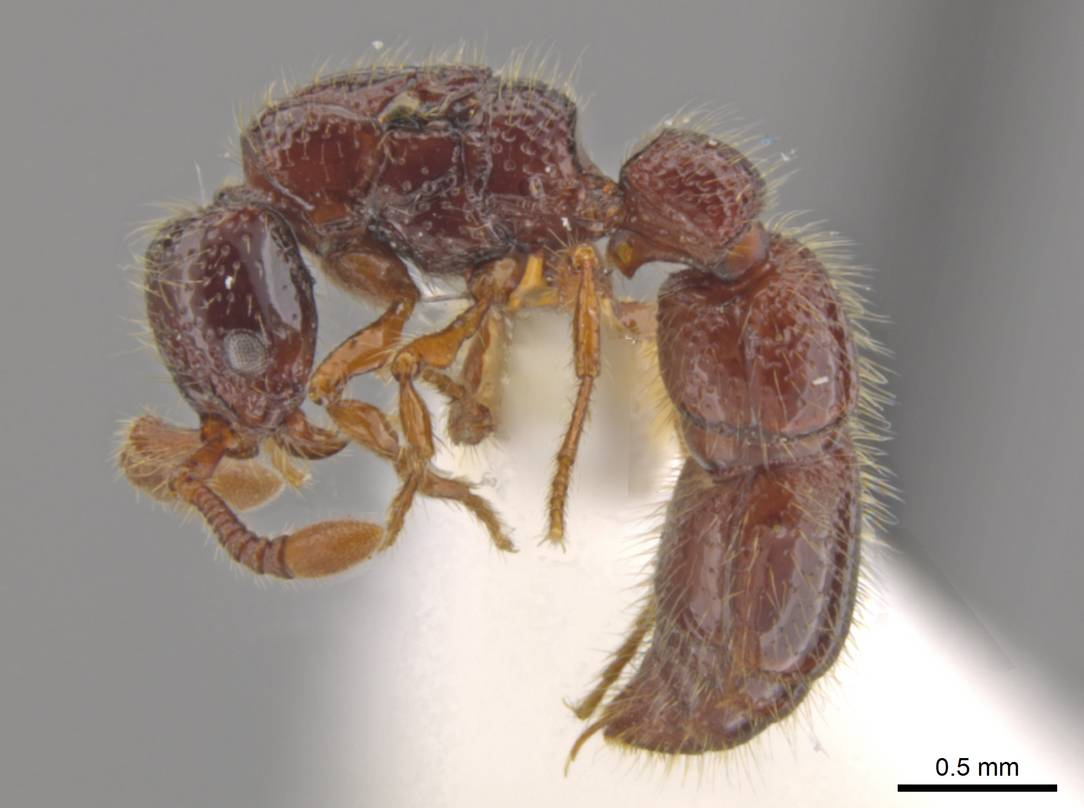
- Neocerapachys neotropicus

Scientific classification
- Domain: Eukaryota
- Kingdom: Animalia
- Phylum: Arthropoda
- Class: Insecta
- Order: Hymenoptera
- Family: Formicidae
- Subfamily: Dorylinae
- Genus: Neocerapachys; Borowiec, 2016

Type species
- Cerapachys neotropicus Weber, 1939

Diversity
- 2 species

= Neocerapachys =

Genus of ants

Neocerapachys is a genus of ants in the subfamily Dorylinae containing 2 described species. The genus is distributed across the Neotropical bioregion in central and South America. Neocerapachys was described by Borowiec (2016) during redescription of the doryline genera.

== Species ==
Species:

- Neocerapachys neotropicus (Weber, 1939)
- Neocerapachys splendens (Borgmeier, 1957)
