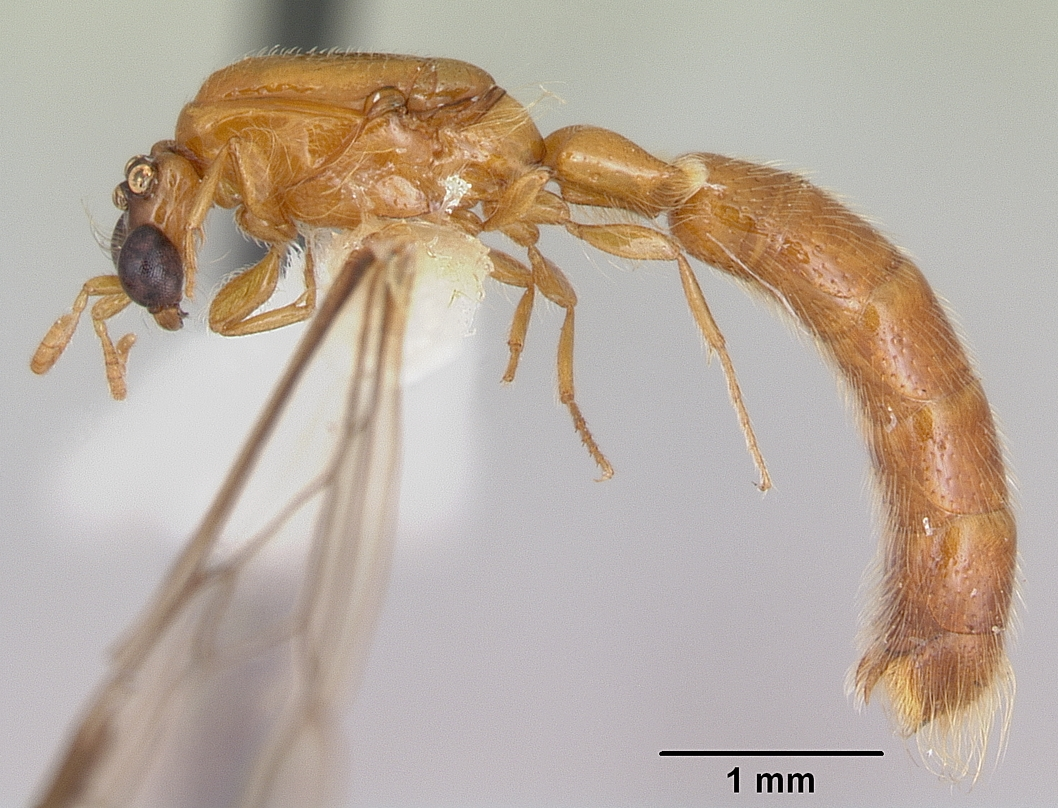
- Aenictogiton sp. male from Zambia

Scientific classification
- Domain: Eukaryota
- Kingdom: Animalia
- Phylum: Arthropoda
- Class: Insecta
- Order: Hymenoptera
- Family: Formicidae
- Subfamily: Dorylinae
- Genus: Aenictogiton; Emery, 1901

Type species
- Aenictogiton fossiceps

Diversity
- 7 species

= Aenictogiton =

Genus of ants

Aenictogiton is a genus of ants, comprising seven rarely collected species. All the species are known only from males found in Central Africa, and show a morphological and phylogenetic affinity to the army ant genus Dorylus. The dorylomorph ants include six subfamilies– Aenictogitoninae, Cerapachyinae, Leptanilloidinae, and the three army ant subfamilies Aenictinae, Dorylinae and Ecitoninae.

== Origin ==
Army ants predominantly reside in tropical and subtropical areas of Africa, the Americas, Asia, and Indo-Australia, however, a few species range into more temperate regions. The Ecitoninae all reside in the New World with an exception to two army ant subfamilies that are located in the Old World. Most of the species are located in Oriental and Indo-Australian regions and a small variety in the Afrotropical region.

== Behavioral and Reproductive Traits ==
All species within the three army ant subfamilies have similar behavioral and reproductive traits such as, obligate collective foraging, nomadism, and highly modified queens called dichthadiigynes. Aenictogiton or army ants never forage or hunt alone, they instead use leaderless, co-operative mass of ants to overwhelm their prey all at once. The army ants never reside in one location and do not build permanent nests. Therefore, they forage and hunt in different locations and emigrate periodically. The Queen are wingless and contain expandable abdomens that allow them to produce millions of eggs per month, which allows variation to occur within the species.

== Species ==
- Aenictogiton attenuatus Santschi, 1919
- Aenictogiton bequaerti Forel, 1913
- Aenictogiton elongatus Santschi, 1919
- Aenictogiton emeryi Forel, 1913
- Aenictogiton fossiceps Emery, 1901 (type species)
- Aenictogiton schoutedeni Santschi, 1924
- Aenictogiton sulcatus Santschi, 1919
