= Sphinctomyrmex marcoyi =

Scientific classification
- Domain: Eukaryota
- Kingdom: Animalia
- Phylum: Arthropoda
- Class: Insecta
- Order: Hymenoptera
- Family: Formicidae
- Genus: Sphinctomyrmex
- Species: S. marcoyi

Binomial name
- Sphinctomyrmex marcoyi Feitosa, Brandão, et al. 2011

Species of ant

Sphinctomyrmex marcoyi is a Neotropical species of ants in the subfamily Dorylinae. It is the only Sphinctomyrmex species recorded in the Amazon Forest. Gynes and males are unknown.

== Description ==
Sphinctomyrmex marcoyi is known only from the holotype, a worker collected from a soil sample. Nothing is known about its biology. S. marcoyi can be easily separated from other species in the genus by its comparatively diminutive size, conspicuously elongate head, comparatively short scapes, and by the presence of a smooth longitudinal stripe on the dorsum of mesosoma, which is otherwise covered by foveolae and subdecumbent to erect hairs.
