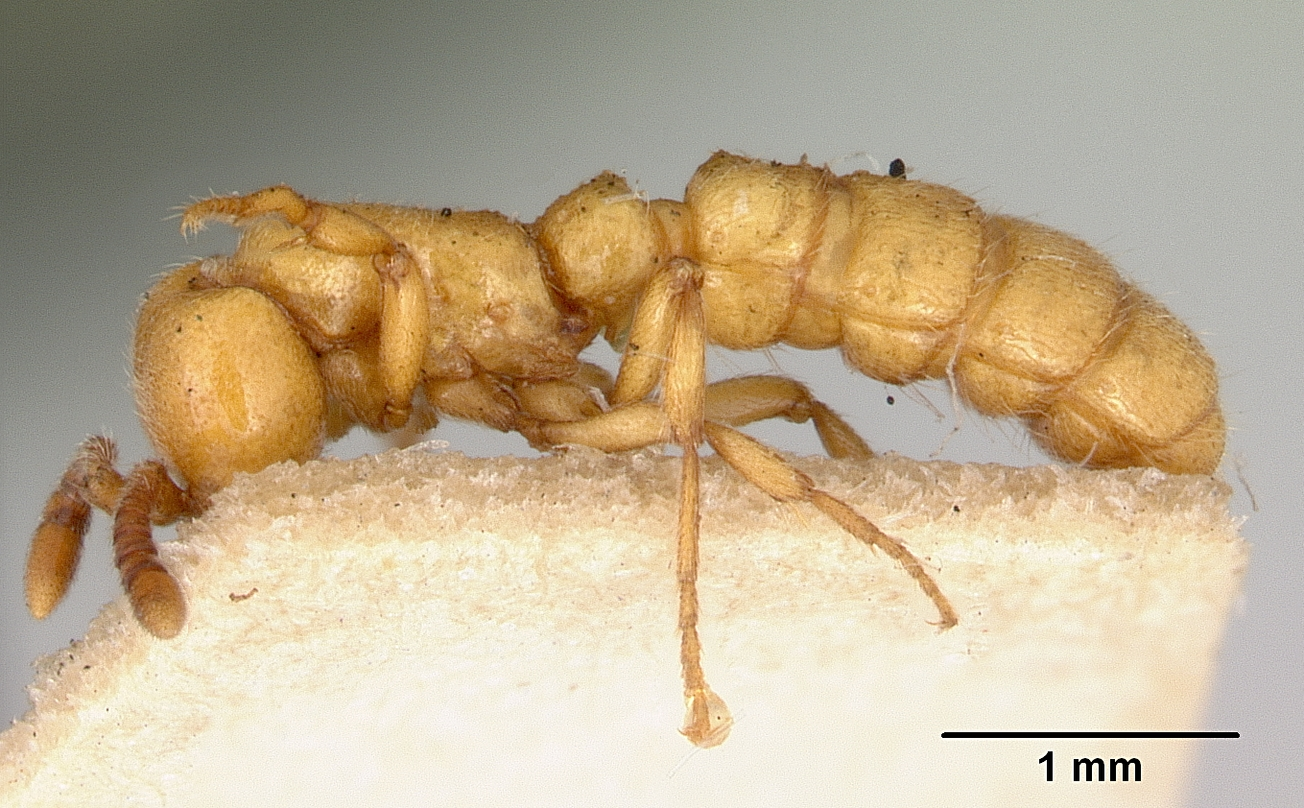
- Zasphinctus imbecilis worker from Australia

Scientific classification
- Kingdom: Animalia
- Phylum: Arthropoda
- Class: Insecta
- Order: Hymenoptera
- Family: Formicidae
- Subfamily: Dorylinae
- Genus: Zasphinctus; Wheeler, 1918

Type species
- Sphinctomyrmex stali Forel, 1900

Diversity
- 23 species

Synonyms
- Eusphinctus (Zasphinctus) Wheeler, 1918

= Zasphinctus =

Genus of ants

Zasphinctus is a genus of ants in the subfamily Dorylinae. The genus is a pantropical and distinctive group, originally described by Wheeler (1918) based on "Sphinctomyrmex" turneri collected in Queensland, Australia. Zasphinctus was first described as a subgenus of "Eusphinctus", and then synonymized into Sphinctomyrmex, to later be raised to full genus status by Borowiec (2016), who included approximately 20 species in the new genus circumscription.

The species Zasphinctus sarowiwai was named in honor of Nigerian peace activist and writer Ken Saro-Wiwa in 2017.

== Species ==
- Zasphinctus asper (Brown, 1975)
- Zasphinctus caledonicus (Wilson, 1957)
- Zasphinctus cedaris (Forel, 1915)
- Zasphinctus chariensis (Santschi, 1915)
- Zasphinctus clarus (Forel, 1893)
- Zasphinctus cribratus (Emery, 1897)
- Zasphinctus duchaussoyi (Andre, 1905)
- Zasphinctus emeryi (Forel, 1893)
- Zasphinctus froggatti (Forel, 1900)
- Zasphinctus imbecilis (Forel, 1907)
- Zasphinctus marcoyi (Feitosa et al. 2011)
- Zasphinctus mjobergi (Forel, 1915)
- Zasphinctus myops (Forel, 1895)
- Zasphinctus nigricans (Clark, 1926)
- Zasphinctus obamai Hita Garcia, 2017
- Zasphinctus occidentalis ((Clark, 1923)
- Zasphinctus rufiventris (Santschi, 1915)
- Zasphinctus sarowiwai Hita Garcia, 2017
- Zasphinctus septtrionalis (Crawley, 1925)
- Zasphinctus siamensis (Jaitrong, 2016)
- Zasphinctus steinheili (Forel, 1900)
- Zasphinctus trux (Brown, 1975)
- Zasphinctus turneri (Forel, 1900)
- Zasphinctus wilsoni Hita Garcia, 2017
