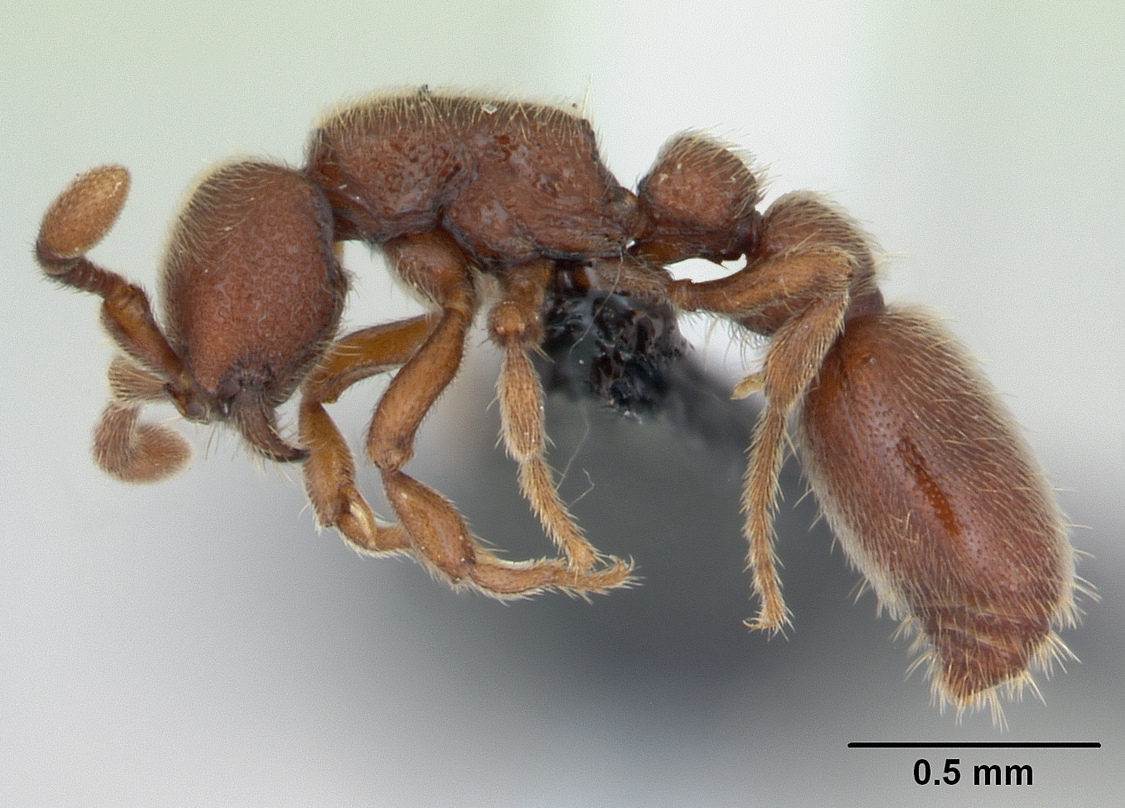
- Ooceraea biroi

Scientific classification
- Kingdom: Animalia
- Phylum: Arthropoda
- Class: Insecta
- Order: Hymenoptera
- Family: Formicidae
- Subfamily: Dorylinae
- Genus: Ooceraea; Roger, 1862

Type species
- Ooceraea fragosa Roger, 1862

Diversity
- 16 species

= Ooceraea =

Genus of ants

Ooceraea is a genus of ants in the subfamily Dorylinae containing approximately 16 described species. The genus is distributed across the Australasia, Indomalaya, Malagasy, Neotropical, Oceania, and Palearctic bioregions. Ooceraea was described by Roger (1862) and later placed as a junior synonym of Cerapachys by Brown (1973). Ooceraea was resurrected as a valid genus by Borowiec (2016) during redescription of the doryline genera.

== Species ==
- Ooceraea alii (Bharti & Akbar, 2013)
- Ooceraea australis (Forel, 1900)
- Ooceraea besucheti (Brown, 1975)
- Ooceraea biroi (Forel, 1907)
- Ooceraea coeca Mayr, 1897
- Ooceraea crypta (Mann, 1921)
- Ooceraea decamera Bharti et al., 2021
- Ooceraea fragosa Roger, 1862
- Ooceraea fuscior (Mann, 1921)
- Ooceraea guizhouensis (Zhou, 2006)
- Ooceraea joshii Bharti et al., 2021
- Ooceraea octoantenna (Zhou et al, 2020)
- Ooceraea papuana Emery, 1897
- Ooceraea pawa (Mann, 1919)
- Ooceraea pusilla Emery, 1897
- Ooceraea quadridentata Yamada et al., 2018
