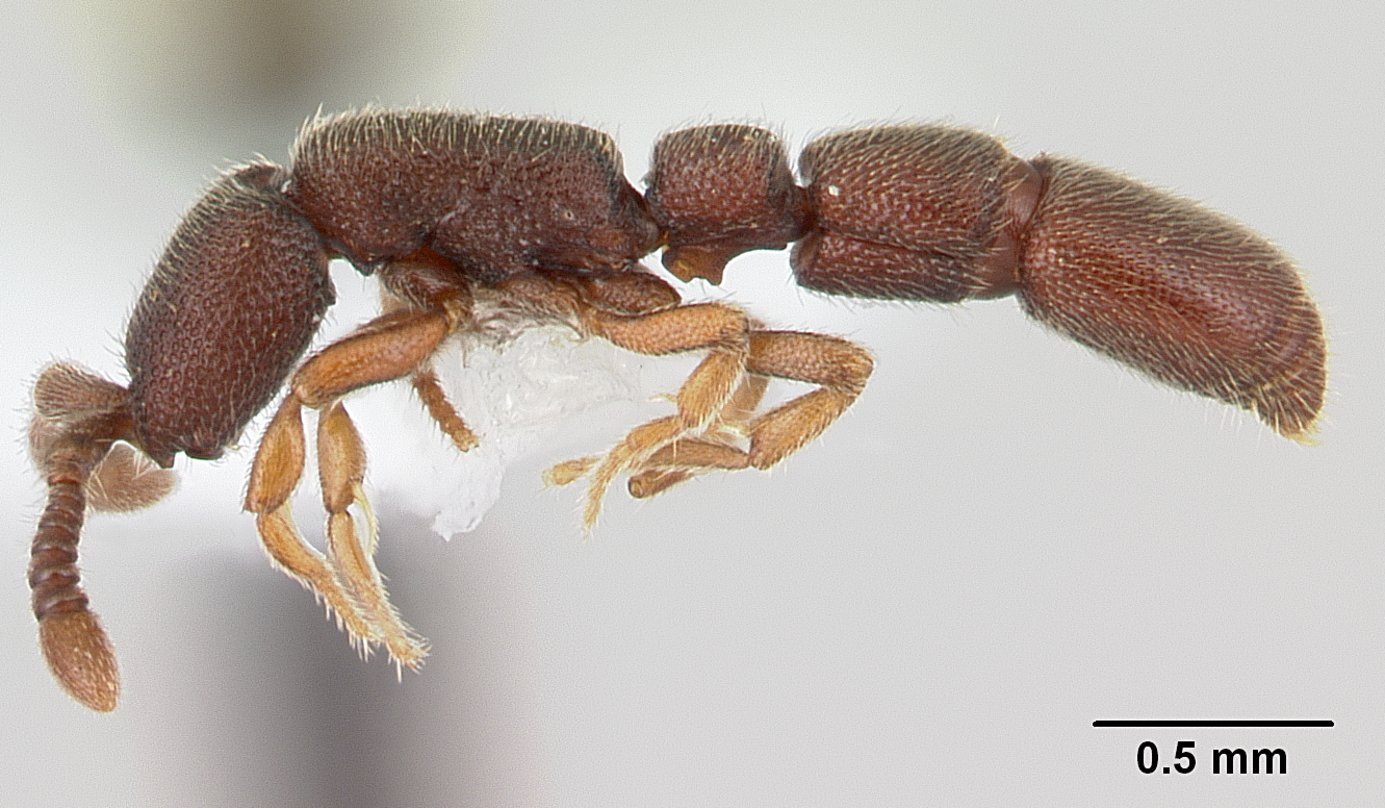
- Profile view

Scientific classification
- Kingdom: Animalia
- Phylum: Arthropoda
- Clade: Pancrustacea
- Class: Insecta
- Order: Hymenoptera
- Family: Formicidae
- Genus: Syscia
- Species: S. typhla

Binomial name
- Syscia typhla Roger, 1861

Synonyms
- Cerapachys typhlus

= Syscia typhla =

Species of ant

Syscia typhla is a species of reddish brown army ant found in the Sinharaja Rain Forest, Sri Lanka.
