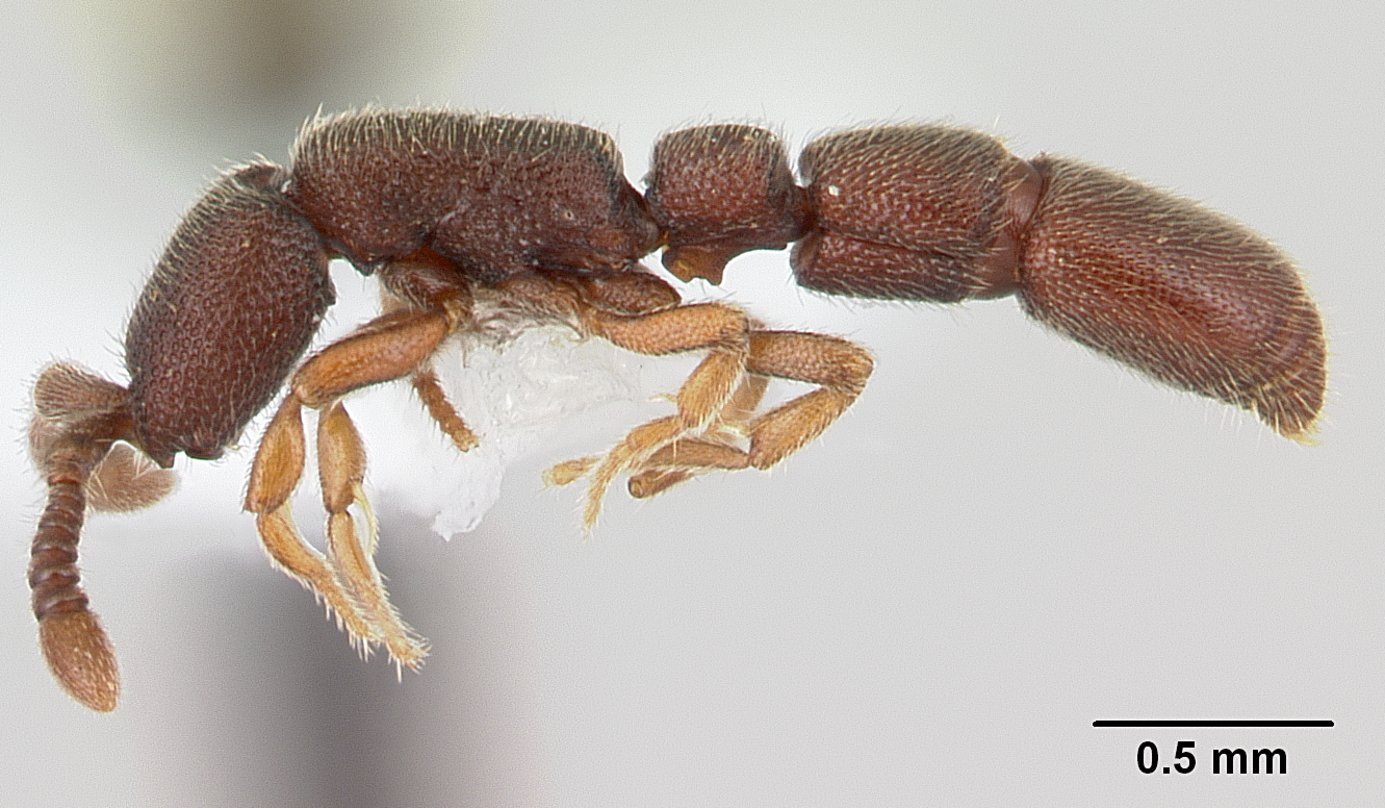
- S. typhla worker

Scientific classification
- Domain: Eukaryota
- Kingdom: Animalia
- Phylum: Arthropoda
- Class: Insecta
- Order: Hymenoptera
- Family: Formicidae
- Subfamily: Dorylinae
- Genus: Syscia; Roger, 1861

Type species
- Syscia typhla Roger, 1861

Diversity
- 38 species

= Syscia =

Genus of ants

Syscia is a genus of ants in the subfamily Dorylinae containing thirty eight described species. The genus is distributed widely across the Eastern Asia, North America, and South America. Syscia was described by Roger (1861), later placed as a Cerapachys subgenus by Wheeler (1902) and then junior synonym of Cerapachys by Kempf (1972). Syscia was resurrected as a valid genus by Borowiec (2016) during redescription of the doryline genera.

== Species ==
- Syscia amblyogyna Longino & Branstetter, 2021
- Syscia atitlana Longino & Branstetter, 2021
- Syscia augustae (Wheeler, 1902)
- Syscia austrella Longino & Branstetter, 2021
- Syscia benevidesae Longino & Branstetter, 2021
- Syscia borowieci Longino & Branstetter, 2021
- Syscia boudinoti Longino & Branstetter, 2021
- Syscia brachyptera Longino & Branstetter, 2021
- Syscia chaladthanyakiji Jaitrong et al., 2020
- Syscia chiapaneca Longino & Branstetter, 2021
- Syscia disjuncta Longino & Branstetter, 2021
- Syscia grandis Longino & Branstetter, 2021
- Syscia honduriana (Mann, 1922)
- Syscia humicola (Ogata, 1983)
- Syscia jennierussae Longino & Branstetter, 2021
- Syscia lacandona Longino & Branstetter, 2021
- Syscia latepunctata Longino & Branstetter, 2021
- Syscia machaquila Longino & Branstetter, 2021
- Syscia madrensis Longino & Branstetter, 2021
- Syscia minuta Longino & Branstetter, 2021
- Syscia murillocruzae Longino & Branstetter, 2021
- Syscia parietalis Longino & Branstetter, 2021
- Syscia parva Longino & Branstetter, 2021
- Syscia persimilis Longino & Branstetter, 2021
- Syscia pervagata Longino & Branstetter, 2021
- Syscia peten Longino & Branstetter, 2021
- Syscia pollula Longino & Branstetter, 2021
- Syscia quisquilis Longino & Branstetter, 2021
- Syscia reticularis Jaitrong et al., 2020
- Syscia setosa Longino & Branstetter, 2021
- Syscia sumnichti Longino & Branstetter, 2021
- Syscia ticomontana Longino & Branstetter, 2021
- Syscia tolteca (Forel, 1909)
- Syscia transisthmica Longino & Branstetter, 2021
- Syscia truncata Longino & Branstetter, 2021
- Syscia typhla Roger, 1861
- Syscia valenzuelai Longino & Branstetter, 2021
- Syscia volucris Longino & Branstetter, 2021
