= Cerapachys paradoxus =

Scientific classification
- Domain: Eukaryota
- Kingdom: Animalia
- Phylum: Arthropoda
- Class: Insecta
- Order: Hymenoptera
- Family: Formicidae
- Genus: Cerapachys
- Species: C. paradoxus

Binomial name
- Cerapachys paradoxus Borowiec, M. L., 2009

Species of ant

Cerapachys paradoxus is a species of ant in the genus Cerapachys. It was discovered and described by Borowiec, M. L. in 2009.
