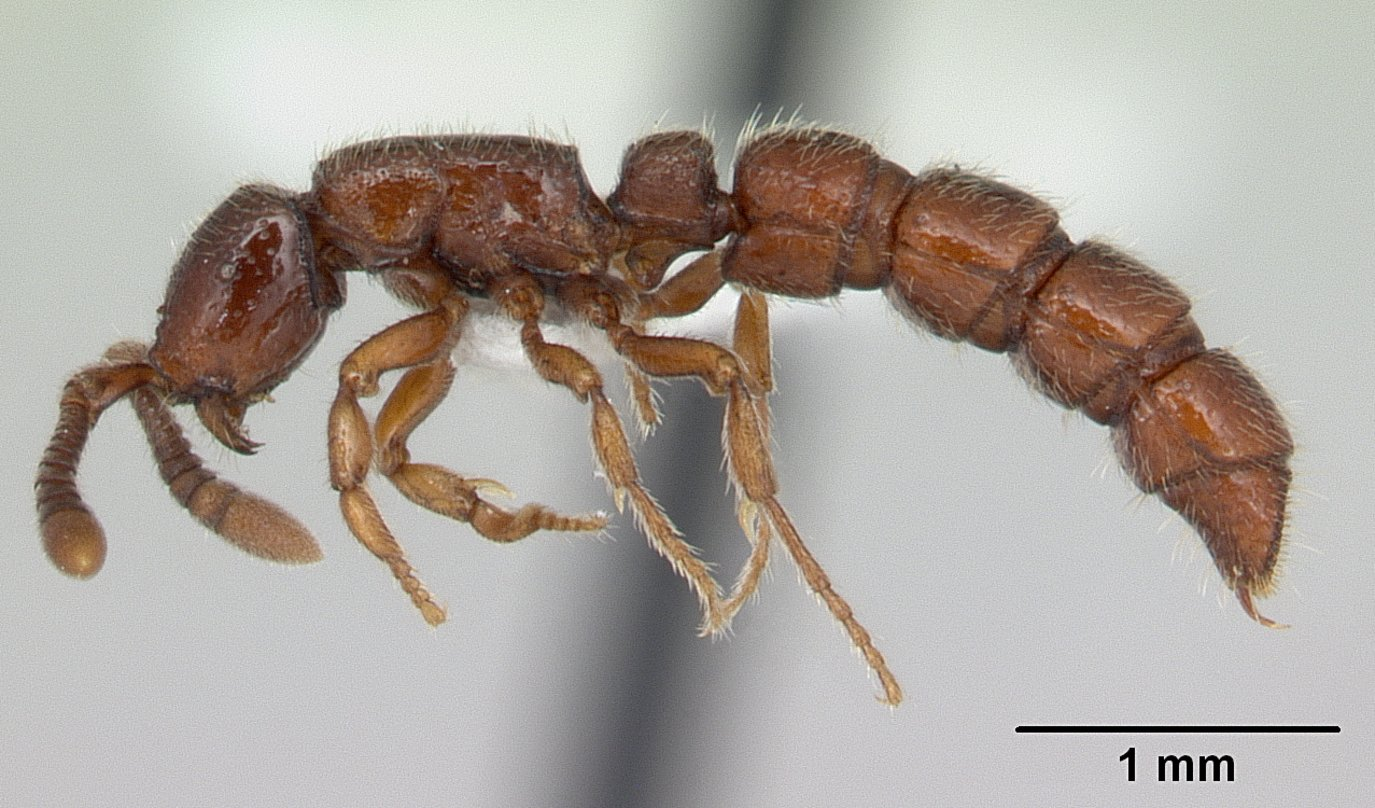
- S. stali worker Santa Catarina state, Brazil

Scientific classification
- Domain: Eukaryota
- Kingdom: Animalia
- Phylum: Arthropoda
- Class: Insecta
- Order: Hymenoptera
- Family: Formicidae
- Subfamily: Dorylinae
- Genus: Sphinctomyrmex; Mayr, 1866

Type species
- Sphinctomyrmex stali Mayr, 1866

Diversity
- 3 species

Synonyms
- Aethiopopone Santschi, 1930; Nothosphinctus Wheeler, 1918

= Sphinctomyrmex =

Genus of ants

Sphinctomyrmex is a genus of ants in the subfamily Dorylinae. The genus is a tropical and distinctive group, originally described by Mayr based on a single gyne collected in Brazil. Morphologically, the genus is characterized by the unique arrangement of the gastric segments, which are nearly equal in length and separated from each other by distinct constrictions. Very little is known on the natural history of Sphinctomyrmex. The few observations so far suggest that ants of this genus are nomadic predators of other ants. The genus Zasphinctus and approximately 20 species were formerly included, but were split out during revision of the Dorylinae genera by Borowiec (2016).

== Species ==
- Sphinctomyrmex marcoyi Feitosa, Brandão, et al. 2011
- Sphinctomyrmex schoerederi Feitosa, Brandão, et al. 2011
- Sphinctomyrmex stali Mayr, 1866
