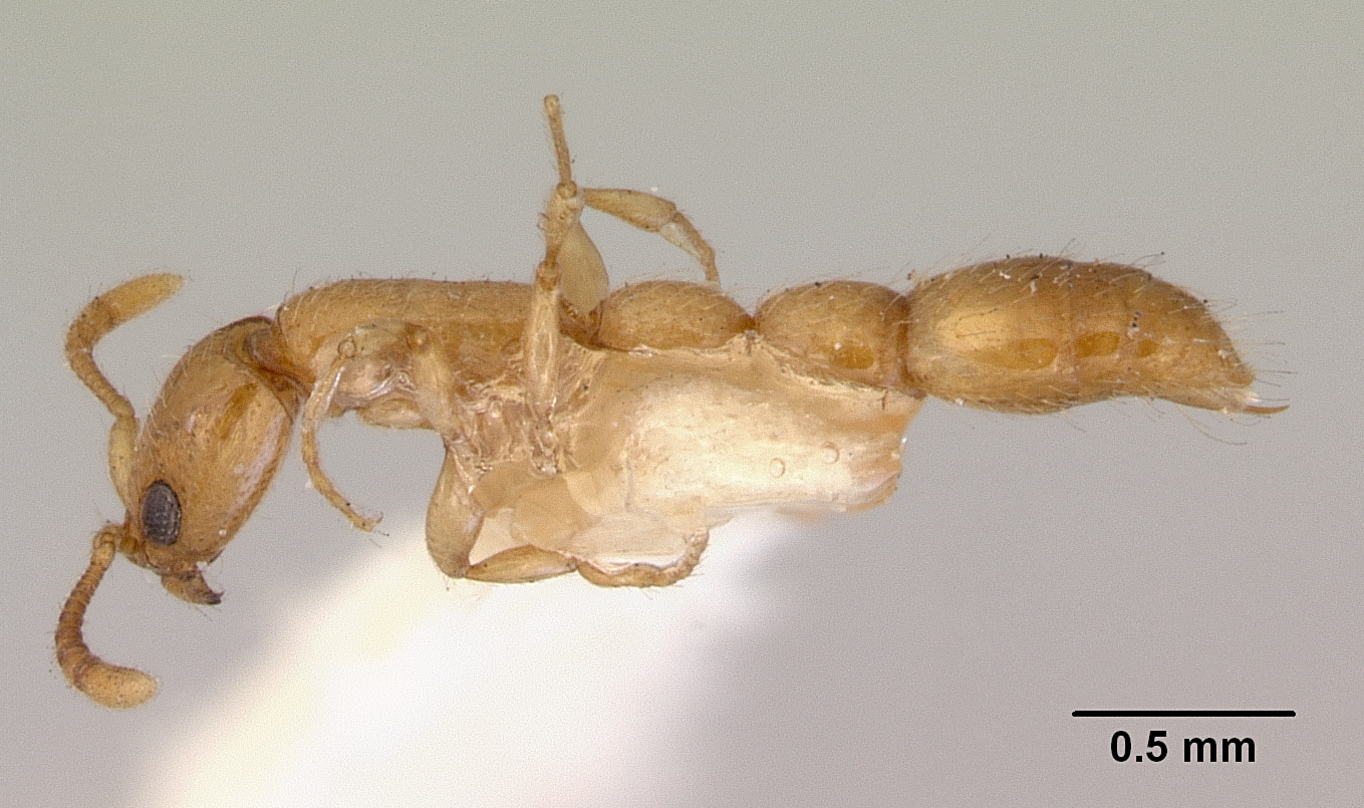
- Vicinopone conciliatrix worker from Ghana

Scientific classification
- Kingdom: Animalia
- Phylum: Arthropoda
- Clade: Pancrustacea
- Class: Insecta
- Order: Hymenoptera
- Family: Formicidae
- Subfamily: Dorylinae
- Genus: Vicinopone; Bolton & Fisher, 2012
- Species: V. conciliatrix

Binomial name
- Vicinopone conciliatrix (Brown, 1975)

Synonyms
- Simopone conciliatrix Brown, 1975 (type species of Vicinopone)

= Vicinopone =

Genus of ants

Vicinopone is a monotypic Afrotropical genus of arboreal ants in the subfamily Dorylinae. Vicinopone conciliatrix, the only species in the genus, was first described as Simopone conciliatrix by Brown in 1975 and was transferred to its own genus by Bolton & Fisher in 2012. V. conciliatrix appears to be quite widely distributed but rare. Its rarity is more likely apparent than real because it nests and forages in trees, rarely if ever coming down to the ground.
