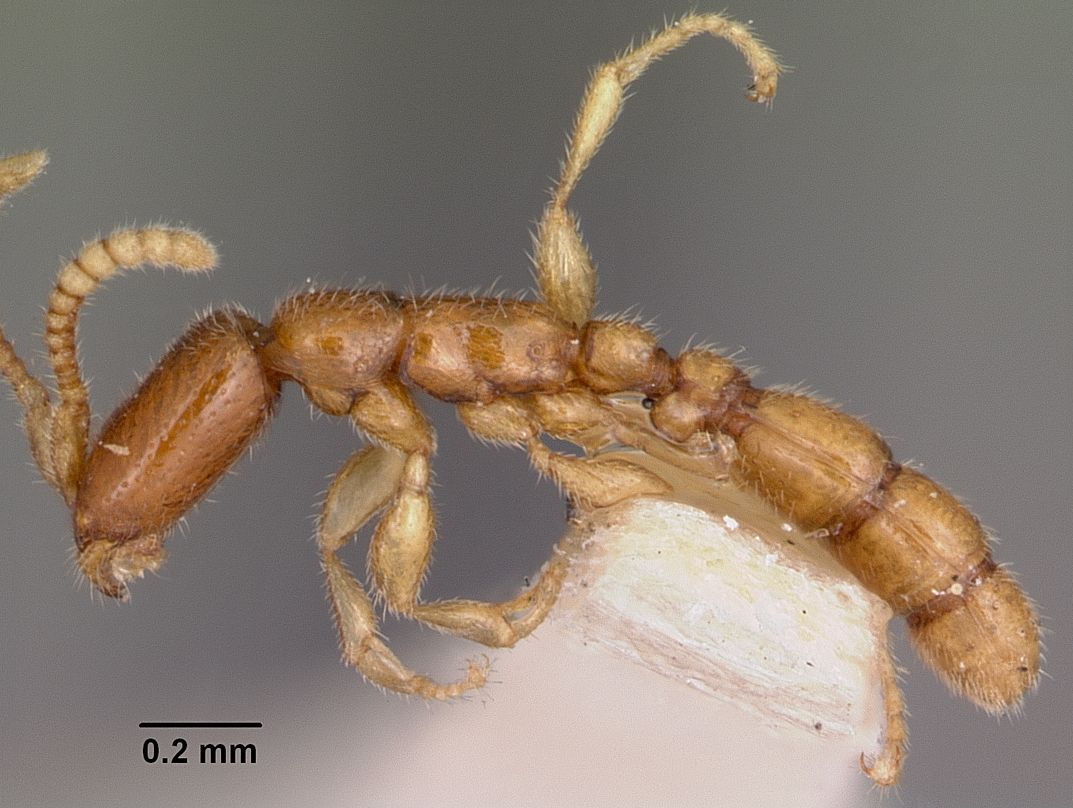
- Leptanilloides biconstricta worker from Bolivia

Scientific classification
- Kingdom: Animalia
- Phylum: Arthropoda
- Class: Insecta
- Order: Hymenoptera
- Family: Formicidae
- Subfamily: Dorylinae
- Genus: Leptanilloides; Mann, 1923

Type species
- Leptanilloides biconstricta Mann, 1923

Diversity
- 19 species

Synonyms
- Amyrmex Kusnezov, 1953; Asphinctanilloides Brandão et al., 1999

= Leptanilloides =

Genus of ants

Leptanilloides is a genus of ants in the subfamily Dorylinae. Leptanilloides is an uncommonly collected genus with subterranean habits in the New World Andean and sub-Andean tropics.

== Taxonomy ==
With cryptic and eyeless worker ants, the genus was included in the ant subfamily Cerapachyinae until the establishment of a separate subfamily, Leptanilloidinae, hypothesized as the sister group to the Cerapachyinae and all other members of the dorylomorphs. However, they were synonymized with the previous dorylomorph subfamilies (including the Leptanilloidinae) under Dorylinae.

== Species ==
- Leptanilloides amazonus (Brandão et al., 1999)
- Leptanilloides anae (Brandão et al., 1999)
- Leptanilloides atlanticus Silva et al., 2013
- Leptanilloides biconstrictus Mann, 1923
- Leptanilloides caracola Donoso et al., 2006
- Leptanilloides chihuahuaensis MacGown et al., 2015
- Leptanilloides copalinga Delsinne & Donoso, 2015
- Leptanilloides erinys Borowiec & Longino, 201
- Leptanilloides femoralis Borowiec & Longino, 2011
- Leptanilloides golbachi (Kusnezov, 1953)
- Leptanilloides gracilis Borowiec & Longino, 2011
- Leptanilloides improvisus Brandão et al., 1999
- Leptanilloides legionarius Brandão et al., 1999
- Leptanilloides manauara (Brandão et al., 1999)
- Leptanilloides mckennae Longino, 2003
- Leptanilloides nomadus Donoso et al., 2006
- Leptanilloides nubecula Donoso et al., 2006
- Leptanilloides prometeus Delsinne & Donoso, 2015
- Leptanilloides sculpturatus Brandão et al., 1999
