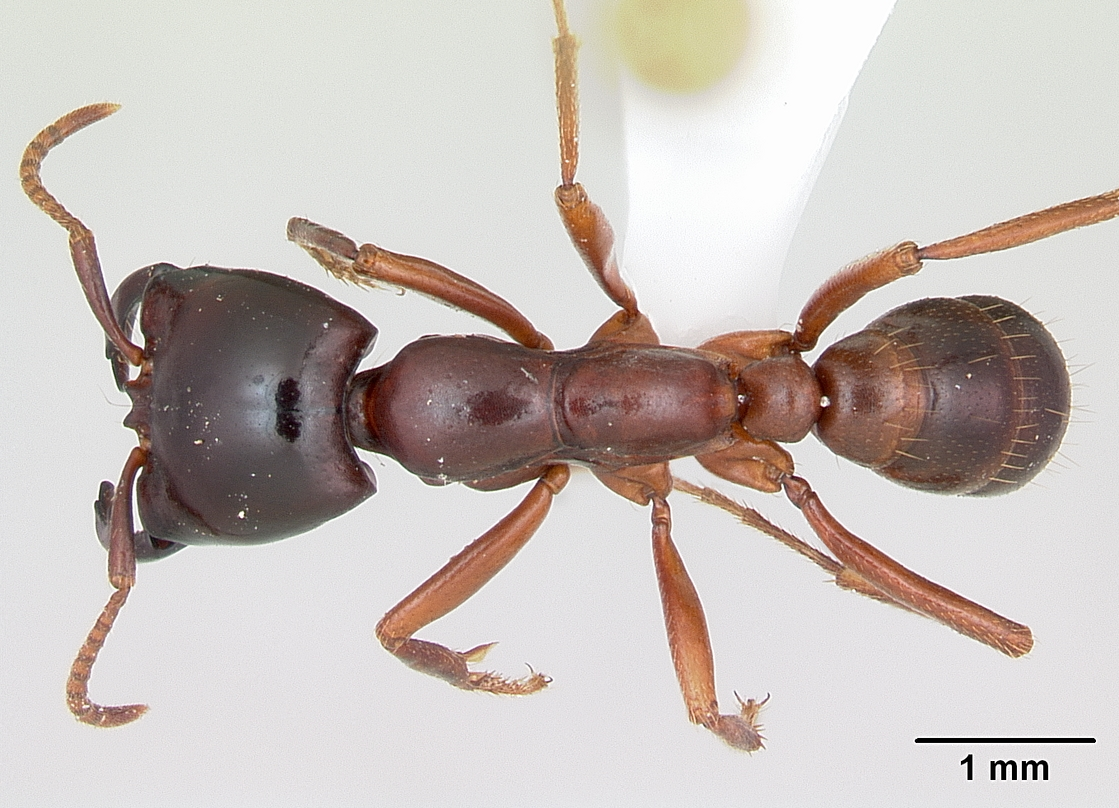
- D. gribodoi

Scientific classification
- Kingdom: Animalia
- Phylum: Arthropoda
- Class: Insecta
- Order: Hymenoptera
- Family: Formicidae
- Subfamily: Dorylinae; Leach, 1815

Type genus
- Dorylus Fabricius, 1793

Diversity
- 28 genera

= Dorylinae =

Subfamily of ants

Dorylinae is an ant subfamily, with distributions in both the Old World and New World. Brady et al. (2014) synonymized the previous dorylomorph subfamilies (Aenictinae, Aenictogitoninae, Cerapachyinae, Ecitoninae, and Leptanilloidinae) under Dorylinae, while Borowiec (2016) reviewed and revised the genera, resurrecting many genera which had previously been merged. Dorylinae genera are suggested to have evolved sometime between 102 to 74 million years ago, subsequently undergoing rapid adaptive radiation events during their early history. Dorylinae ants including Eciton species, exhibit army ant behavior. Non-army Doryline ants like Yunodorylus provides evolution of the army ant adaptive syndrome, including group foraging, nomadism, and specialized queens.

== Genera ==
- Acanthostichus Mayr, 1887
- Aenictogiton Emery, 1901
- Aenictus Shuckard, 1840
- Cerapachys Smith, 1857
- Cheliomyrmex Mayr, 1870
- Chrysapace Crawley, 1924
- Cylindromyrmex Mayr, 1870
- Dorylus Fabricius, 1793
- Eburopone Borowiec, 2016
- Eciton Latreille, 1804
- Eusphinctus Emery, 1893
- Labidus Jurine, 1807
- Leptanilloides Mann, 1923
- Lioponera Mayr, 1879
- Lividopone Bolton & Fisher, 2016
- Neivamyrmex Borgmeier, 1940
- Neocerapachys Borowiec, 2016
- Nomamyrmex Borgmeier, 1936
- Ooceraea Roger, 1862
- Parasyscia Emery, 1882
- †Procerapachys Wheeler, 1915
- Simopone Forel, 1891
- Sphinctomyrmex Mayr, 1866
- Syscia Roger, 1861
- Tanipone Bolton & Fisher, 2012
- Vicinopone Bolton & Fisher, 2012
- Yunodorylus Xu, 2000
- Zasphinctus Wheeler, 1918
