= List of Haeteriinae genera =

These 111 genera belong to Haeteriinae, a subfamily of clown beetles in the family Histeridae. There are at least 330 described species in Haeteriinae.

== Haeteriinae genera ==
- Aemulister Reichensperger, 1938
- Alienister Reichensperger, 1926
- Alienodites Tishechkin, 2007
- Alloiodites Reichensperger, 1939
- Amiculus Dégallier & Bello, 2008
- Anasynodites Reichensperger, 1935
- Aneuterapus Reichensperger, 1958
- Aphanister Reichensperger, 1933
- Aristomorphus Lewis, 1913
- Aristonister Dégallier, 1998
- Aritaerius Kovarik & Tishechkin, 2004
- Attalister Bruch, 1937
- Bastactister Reichensperger, 1939
- Brasilister Dégallier, 1999
- Bruchodites Tishechkin, 2007
- Cachexia Lewis, 1888
- Cheilister Reichensperger, 1924
- Chelonarhister Dégallier, 2004
- Chelonosternus Bickhardt, 1909
- Chelyocephalus Schmidt, 1893
- Chrysetaerius Reichensperger, 1923
- Clientister Reichensperger, 1935
- Coelister Bickhardt, 1917
- Colonides Schmidt, 1889
- Convivister Reichensperger, 1936
- Cossyphodister Reichensperger, 1936
- Cyclechinus Bickhardt, 1917
- Daitrosister Helava in Helava et al., 1985
- Daptesister Helava in Helava et al., 1985
- Discoscelis Schmidt, 1889
- Ecclisister Reichensperger, 1935
- Enicosoma Lewis, 1904
- Eretmotus Lacordaire, 1854
- Euclasea Lewis, 1888
- Eurysister Helava in Helava et al., 1985
- Euxenister Reichensperger, 1923
- Fistulaster Helava in Helava et al., 1985
- Glyptosister Helava in Helava et al., 1985
- Guianahister Tishechkin, 2007
- Haeterius Dejean, 1833
- Helavadites Tishechkin, 2007
- Hemicolonides Reichensperger, 1939
- Hesperodromus Schmidt, 1889
- Hetaeriobius Reichensperger, 1925
- Hetaeriodes Schmidt, 1893
- Hetaeriomorphus Schmidt, 1893
- Hippeutister Reichensperger, 1935
- Homalopygus Boheman, 1858
- Iugulister Reichensperger, 1958
- Kleptisister Helava in Helava et al., 1985
- Latronister Reichensperger, 1932
- Leptosister Helava in Helava et al., 1985
- Lissosternus Lewis, 1905
- Mesynodites Reichardt, 1924
- Metasynodites Reichensperger, 1930
- Microsynodites Tishechkin, 2007
- Monotonodites Reichensperger, 1939
- Morphetaerius Reichensperger, 1939
- Murexus Lewis, 1907
- Mutodites Tishechkin, 2007
- Neocolonides Dégallier, 1998
- Neoterapus Dégallier, 2004
- Nevermannister Reichensperger, 1938
- Nicolasites Tishechkin, 2007
- Nomadister Borgmeier, 1948
- Notocoelis Lewis, 1900
- Nymphister Reichensperger, 1933
- Opadosister Helava in Helava et al., 1985
- Panoplitellus Hedicke, 1923
- Parasynodites Bruch, 1930
- Paratropinus Reichensperger, 1923
- Parodites Reichensperger, 1923
- Paroecister Reichensperger, 1923
- Pelatetister Reichensperger, 1939
- Pinaxister Reichensperger, 1939
- Plagioscelis Bickhardt, 1917
- Plaumannister Reichensperger, 1958
- Procolonides Reichensperger, 1935
- Psalidister Reichensperger, 1924
- Pselaphister Bruch, 1926
- Pterotister Reichensperger, 1939
- Pulvinister Reichensperger, 1933
- Reichenspergerites Tishechkin, 2007
- Renclasea Tishechkin & Caterino, 2009
- Reninoides Helava in Helava et al., 1985
- Reninopsis Helava in Helava et al., 1985
- Reninus Lewis, 1889
- Satrapes Schmidt, 1885
- Scapicoelis Marseul, 1862
- Scapolister Borgmeier, 1930
- Sternocoelis Lewis, 1888
- Sternocoelopsis Reichensperger, 1923
- Symphilister Reichensperger, 1923
- Synetister Reichensperger, 1924
- Synoditinus Reichensperger, 1929
- Synoditulus Reichensperger, 1924
- Terapus Marseul, 1862
- Teratolister Bruch, 1930
- Teratosoma Lewis, 1885
- Termitolister Bruch, 1930
- Termitoxenus Schmidt, 1889
- Thaumataerius Mann, 1923
- Trichoreninus Lewis, 1891
- Troglosternus Bickhardt, 1917
- Tubulister Borgmeier, 1948
- Tylois Marseul, 1864
- Ulkeopsis Helava in Helava et al., 1985
- Ulkeus Horn, 1885
- Voratister Helava, 1989
- Wasmannister Bruch, 1929
- Xenister Borgmeier, 1929
