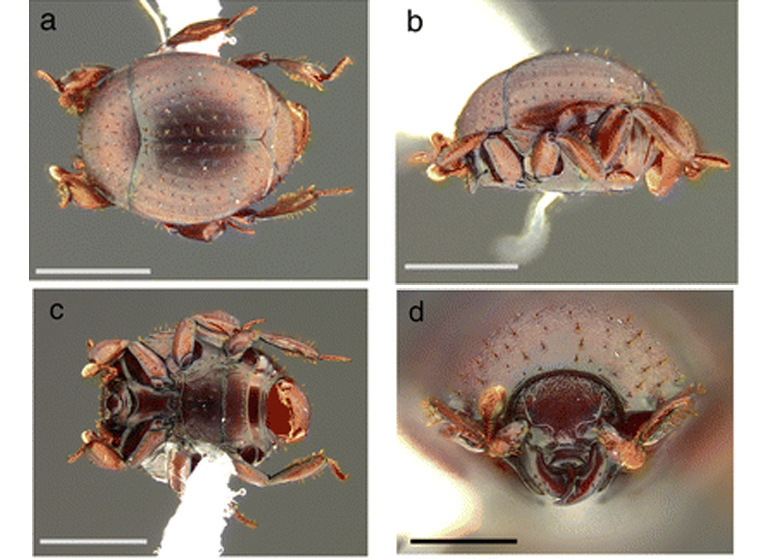

Scientific classification
- Kingdom: Animalia
- Phylum: Arthropoda
- Class: Insecta
- Order: Coleoptera
- Suborder: Polyphaga
- Infraorder: Staphyliniformia
- Family: Histeridae
- Genus: Nymphister
- Species: N. kronaueri

Binomial name
- Nymphister kronaueri von Beeren & Tishechkin 2017

= Nymphister kronaueri =

Species of beetle

Nymphister kronaueri is a species of histerid beetle native to Costa Rica. It was first discovered in 2014. The discovery of the beetle received much media attention due to its unusual habit of hitchhiking on army ants. It was formally described in 2017.

== Discovery ==
The beetle was discovered by biologists Christoph von Beeren and Daniel Kronauer whilst investigating the relationships between army ants of the genus Eciton and their diverse fauna of symbionts in Costa Rica. Alexey Tishechkin, together with Christoph von Beeren, named the new species after their colleague Daniel Kronauer, honoring his many discoveries in army ant research.

== Taxonomy ==
von Beeren and Tishechkin used DNA barcoding as well as the identification of morphological features to conclude that the new species is situated in the genus Nymphister, which previously contained only three other species N. monotonus, N. rettenmeyeri, and N. simplicissimus. Nymphister is a genus in the histerid subfamily Haeteriinae, whose members are often associated with ants or termites. These myrmecophiles or termitophiles often steal food from host colonies or even consume social insect brood.

== Description ==
Nymphister kronaueri is a small, dark red-brown beetle measuring 1.40-1.58 mm in length and 1.18-1.40 mm wide.

== Behaviour ==
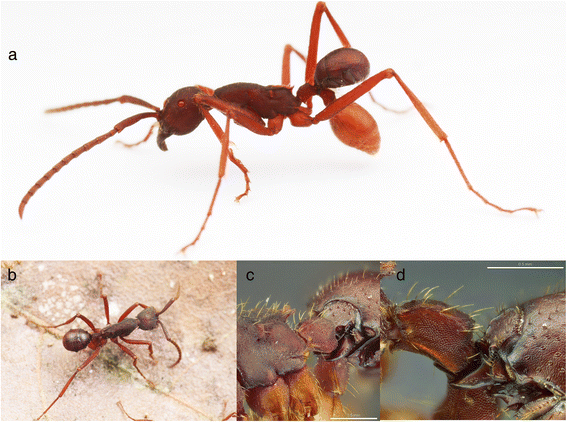
Army ant Eciton mexicanum workers with N. kronaueri attached between the ants’ petiole and postpetiole.

Nymphister kronaueri is noted for its unusual mechanism of phoretic transport - it uses its mouthparts (the mandibles) to attach itself to the waist (between the petiole and postpetiole) of medium sized ant workers of the species Eciton mexicanum. N. kronaueri was observed using this transport mechanism on different classes of worker ant when moving in a night-time emigration column; in almost all cases (>95%), specimens were found toward the end of this column where ant numbers were lower and no ant brood was being carried.

Once attached, the beetles appear to mimic the ants' abdomens. To human eyes, this makes it appear that the ant has two abdominal segments, one above the other. However, given that their activities are largely nocturnal (they don't accompany the ants in daylight), it doesn't seem likely that the organism's nocturnal predators have forced N. kronaueri to look like part of a host's body as they do not hunt by sight. If morphological mimicry is a significant factor at all, it might rather be aimed at the ants themselves, helping N. kronaueri to conceal itself in the ant population (e.g., via Wasmannian/tactile mimicry). Besides the assumed morphological resemblance, the beetle mimics the chemical recognition cues of their host ants, thus smelling like an ant. It has also been shown to be intensively licked/groomed by ant workers, indicating that it might additionally produce appeasing chemical compounds from exocrine glands. Lastly, the beetle, like many members of the subfamily Haeteriinae, is able to retract all its extremities into preformed body cavities, leaving the ants no point of attack.

Nymphister kronaueri has so far only been detected at a single site: La Selva Biological Station in Costa Rica, and has only been detected with the species Eciton mexicanum. Given the cryptic habit and the relatively recent discovery, its actual distribution across the Neotropics will likely expand beyond Costa Rica.
