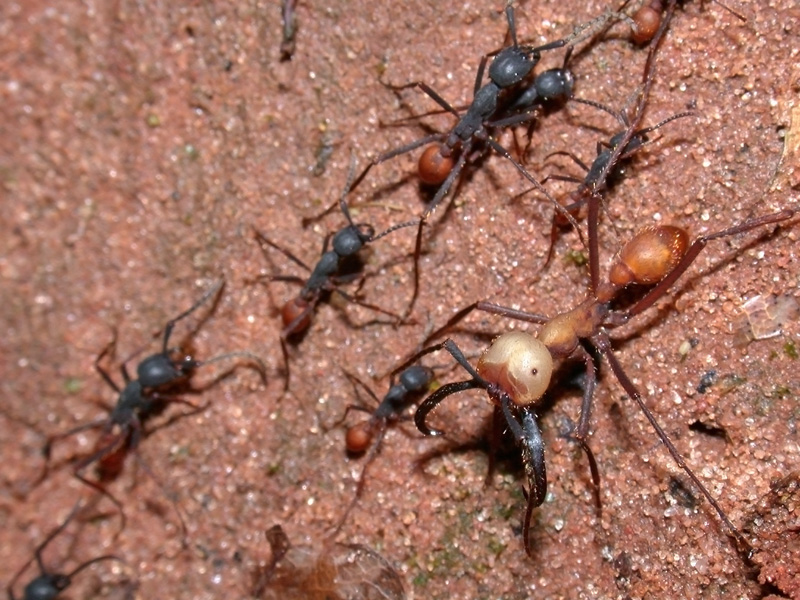
- E. burchellii

Scientific classification
- Kingdom: Animalia
- Phylum: Arthropoda
- Clade: Pancrustacea
- Class: Insecta
- Order: Hymenoptera
- Family: Formicidae
- Subfamily: Dorylinae
- Genus: Eciton; Latreille, 1804

Type species
- Formica hamata

Diversity
- 12 species

Synonyms
- Camptognatha Gray, 1832; Holopone Santschi, 1925; Mayromyrmex Ashmead, 1905

= Eciton =

Genus of ants

Eciton is a New World army ant genus that contains the most familiar species of army ants. The most predominant and well-known species is Eciton burchellii, which is also more commonly known as "Balichana" in the Colombian Caribbean Coast, but also as the army ant and is considered the type species.

Eciton burchellii and Eciton hamatum are the most visible and best studied of the New World army ants because they forage above ground and during the day, in enormous raiding swarms. Their range stretches from southern Mexico to the northern part of Argentina.

== Life cycle ==
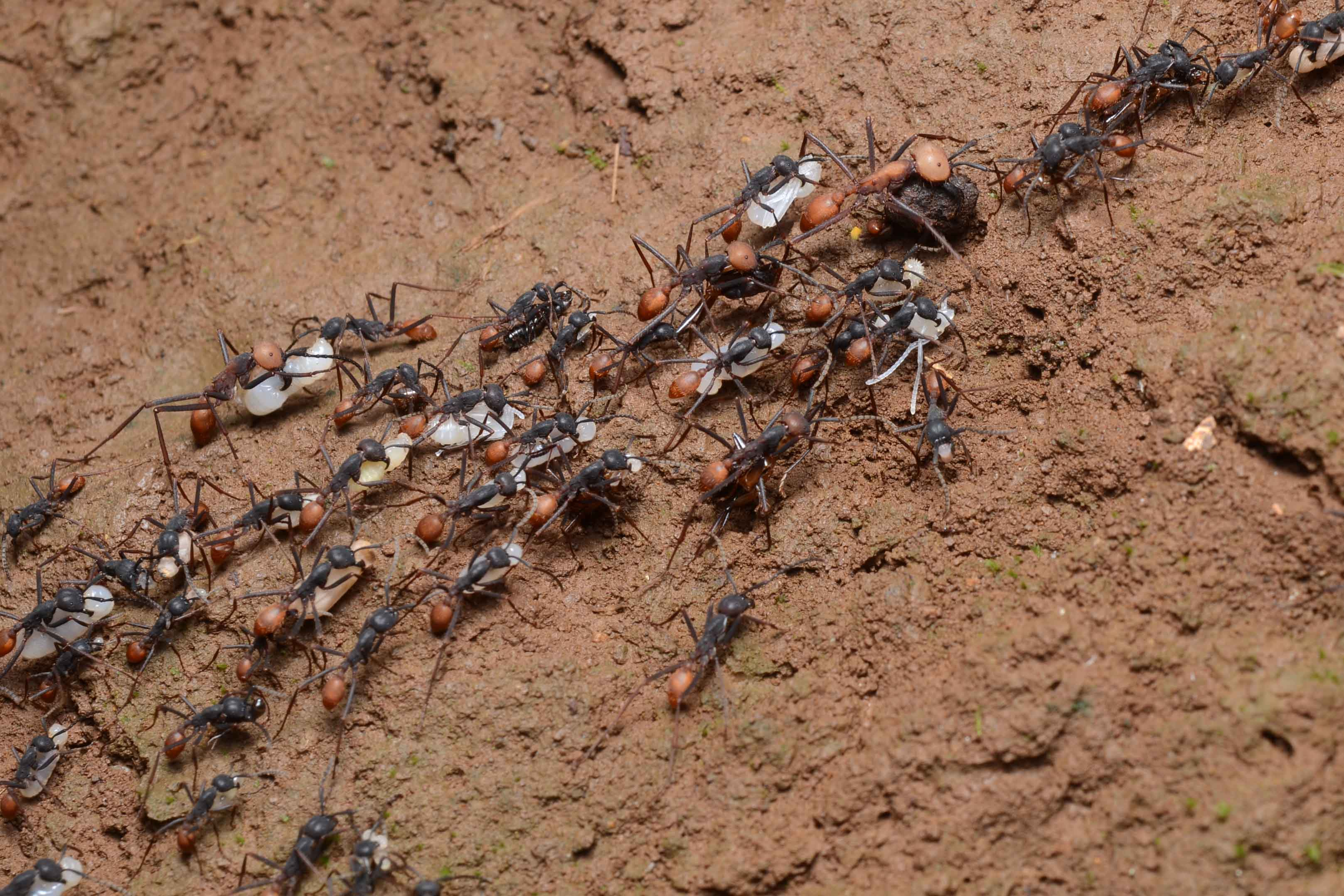
E. burchellii with larvae of a raided wasp nest

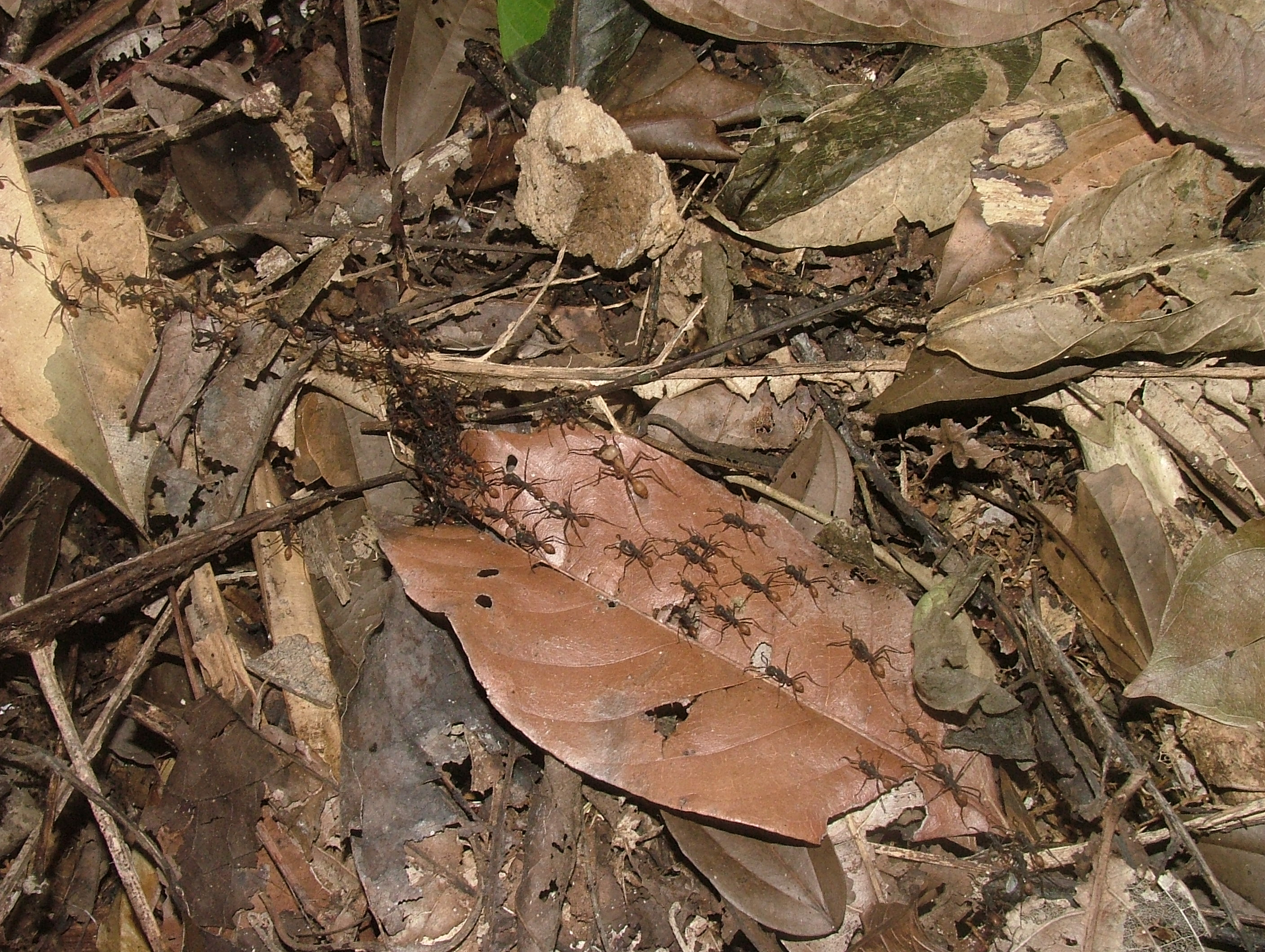
A trail of foraging E. burchellii

Eciton army ants have a bi-phasic lifestyle in which they alternate between a nomadic phase and a statary phase. In the statary phase, which lasts about three weeks, the ants remain in the same location every night. They arrange their own living bodies into a nest, protecting the queen and her eggs in the middle. Such a temporary home is called a "bivouac". In the nomadic phase the ants move their entire colony to a new location nearly every night for about two weeks on end. During said phase, the queen does not lay eggs.

When the ants enter the statary phase, the queen's body swells massively and she lays as many as 80,000 eggs in less than a week. While the eggs mature, the ants swarm with less frequency and intensity. When the eggs hatch, the excitement caused by the increased activity of the larvae causes the colony to enter the nomadic phase. The colony swarms much more intensely and does so nearly every day, and the ants move to a new location nearly every night. After two weeks, around the time when the larvae begin to pupate, the colony again enters the statary phase, and the cycle begins anew.

Because of the regularity and intensity of E. burchelli and E. hamatum swarms, many insect and bird species have evolved complex relationships with these ants. There are conopid flies (the entire genus Stylogaster) that are obligate associates of army ant raids, and females lay their eggs on insects (mostly crickets and roaches) flushed into the open by the ants, and there are also some tachinid flies that are somewhat similar in behavior. There are ant-mimicking staphylinid beetles, shaped like the ants they follow, that run with the swarm, some of them preying on stragglers or other insects injured or flushed by army-ant activity, though most of these are inquilines in the ant nest; these and other insects sometimes spend their entire lives hidden in Eciton colonies, often mimicking the ants or their larvae. Many species of birds — mostly cuckoos, woodcreepers, tanagers, and antbirds — feed near the swarms. About 50 of the approximately 200 species of antbirds specialize in preying on insects fleeing the ants, getting up to half their food this way. Some of these birds actively check army-ant bivouacs each morning and follow the foraging trail to the swarm front, where they take positions based on their species' relations in a dominance hierarchy. A swarm may be attended by as many as 25 birds of one or two "professional" species and individual birds of as many as 30 other species. There are even butterflies (esp. the family Hesperiidae) that feed almost exclusively on the feces of these bird species.

== Parasites ==
The mite Trichocylliba crinita (Elzinga & Rettenmeyer, 1975) (Mesostigmata: Uropodidae) was found on the jaws of the species Eciton dulcium, and nowhere else.

== Species ==
- Eciton burchellii (Westwood, 1842)
- Eciton drepanophorum Smith, 1858
- Eciton dulcium Forel, 1912
- Eciton hamatum (Fabricius, 1782)
- Eciton jansoni Forel, 1912
- Eciton lucanoides Emery, 1894
- Eciton mexicanum Roger, 1863
- Eciton quadriglume (Haliday, 1836)
- Eciton rapax Smith, 1855
- Eciton setigaster Borgmeier, 1953
- Eciton uncinatum Borgmeier, 1953
- Eciton vagans (Olivier, 1792)
