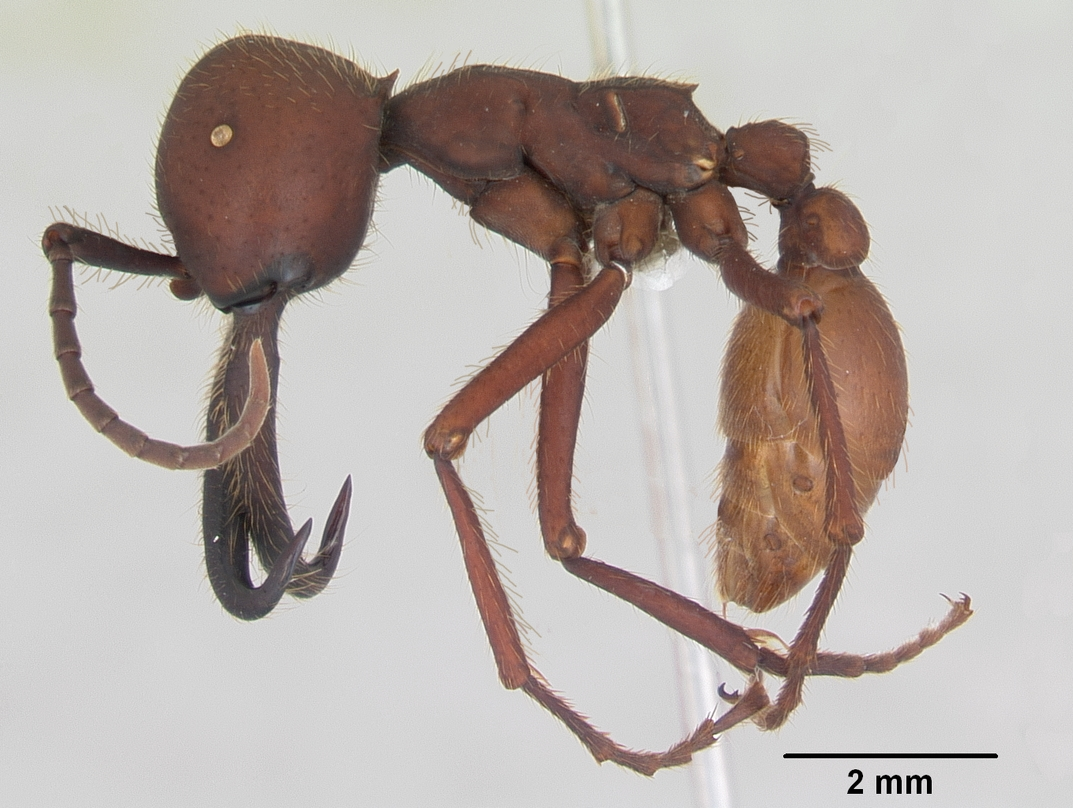
- Eciton vagans worker

Scientific classification
- Domain: Eukaryota
- Kingdom: Animalia
- Phylum: Arthropoda
- Class: Insecta
- Order: Hymenoptera
- Family: Formicidae
- Genus: Eciton
- Species: E. vagans

Binomial name
- Eciton vagans Olivier, 1792

Subspecies
- Eciton vagans allognathum Eciton vagans angustatum Eciton vagans dispar Eciton vagans dubitatum Eciton vagans fur Eciton vagans mutatum Eciton vagans vagans

= Eciton vagans =

Species of ant

Eciton vagans is a species of New World army ant in the genus Eciton. It occurs in dry and wet forest habitats, occupying a range extending from Mexico to throughout Costa Rica and possibly Panama and Colombia. Raids are always in columns and are distinguished in being usually nocturnal; preferred prey commonly include other ants. It is closely related to the Eciton burchellii species.
