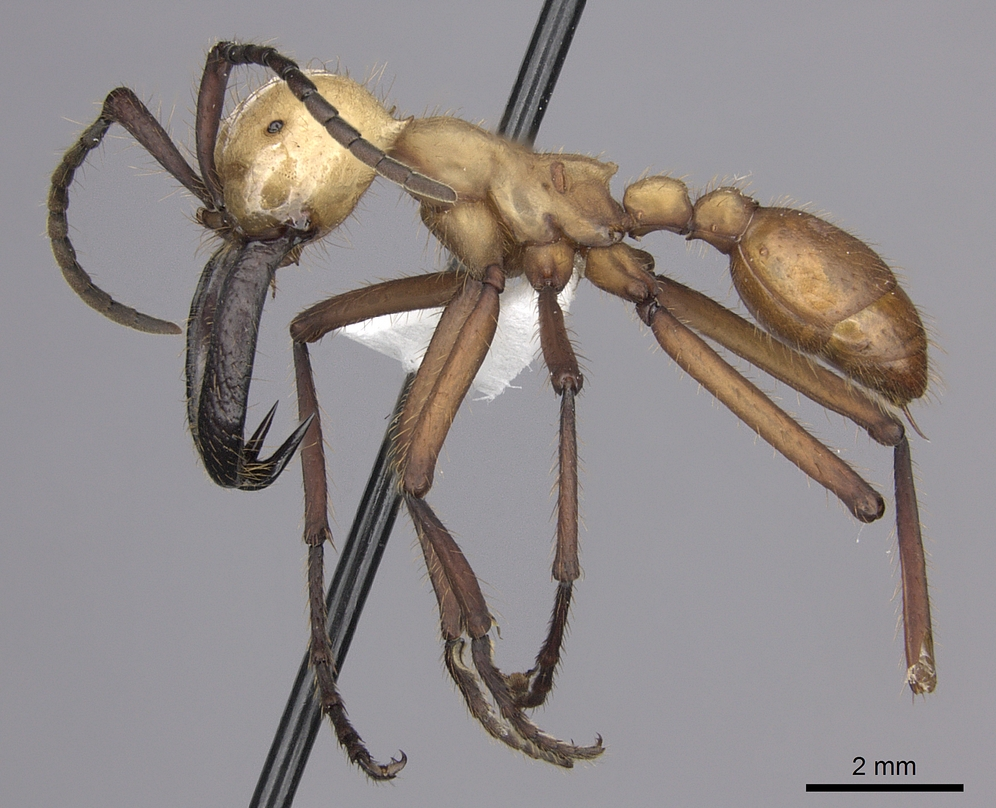

Scientific classification
- Domain: Eukaryota
- Kingdom: Animalia
- Phylum: Arthropoda
- Class: Insecta
- Order: Hymenoptera
- Family: Formicidae
- Genus: Eciton
- Species: E. hamatum

Binomial name
- Eciton hamatum (Fabricius, 1782)

= Eciton hamatum =

Species of ant

Eciton hamatum is a species of army ant in the subfamily Dorylinae; it is found from Mexico to central Brazil and Bolivia. The species differs from Eciton burchellii, in that it does not fan out into the underbrush when foraging. Rather, it forages in columns, often in trees and preying exclusively on the larvae of other social insects. Its prey are often broods of vespid wasps and ants of genera Dolichoderus and Camponotus, suggesting that E. hamatum is mainly an arboreal forager.

They are known to make living bridges with their bodies over small gaps.
