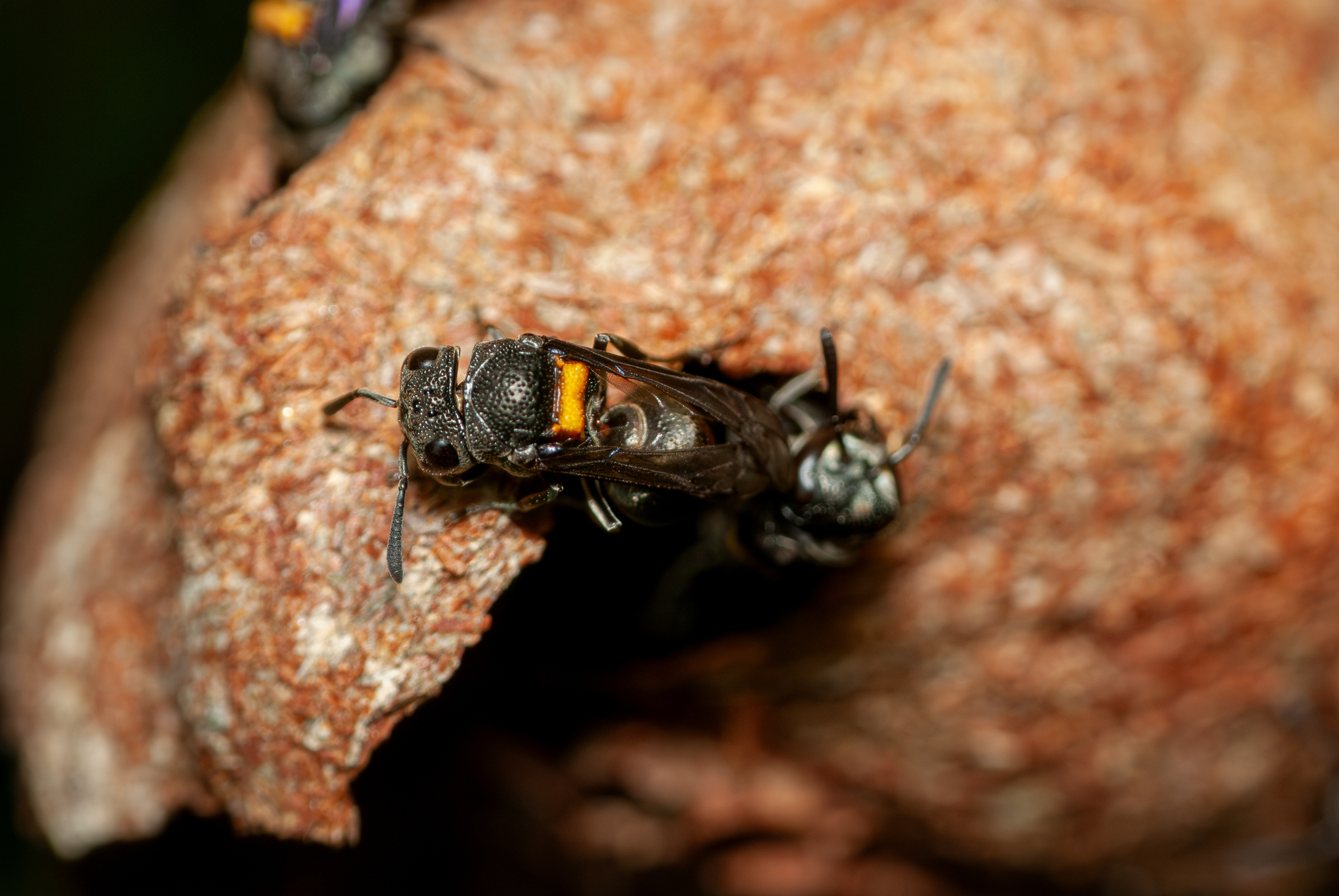

Scientific classification
- Kingdom: Animalia
- Phylum: Arthropoda
- Class: Insecta
- Order: Hymenoptera
- Family: Vespidae
- Genus: Brachygastra
- Species: B. scutellaris

Binomial name
- Brachygastra scutellaris (Fabricius, 1804)

= Brachygastra scutellaris =

Species of wasp

Brachygastra scutellaris, a honey wasp, is a Neotropical, swarm-founding species that is found in South America and has a medium-sized population of 100–1000 individuals per colony. It stores large amounts of nectar in its nest for the production of honey, and it was even found that at certain times of the year, the nectar is toxic to humans, as they will extract nectar from hallucinogenic plants, depending on the season.

== Etymology ==
The genus name Brachygastra comes from Ancient Greek βραχύς (brakhús), meaning "short", and γαστήρ (gastḗr), meaning "belly". The specific epithet scutellaris means "saucer-shaped" in Latin.

== Taxonomy and phylogenetics ==
Brachygastra scutellaris is a part of the family Vespidae and the subfamily Polistinae as well as the tribe Epiponini. As is characteristic of the Vespidae, B. scutellaris is a eusocial wasp, which refers to the complex organization of behavior defined by: living in groups, cooperative care of young, reproductive division of labor and reproductive castes and an overlap of generations. As part of the subfamily Polistinae, food is masticated and subsequently fed to their young. The larvae then regurgitate the masticated food in the form of a nutritious liquid, which is consumed by the adults. Furthermore, as part of the Epiponini tribe, B. scutellaris is observed to be a polygynous species with several queens, and it reproduces via swarming.

Close relatives of Brachygastra scutellaris include: B. azteca, B. lecheguana, and B. mellifica.

== Description and identification ==
Brachygastra scutellaris can be identified by characteristics that are specific to the genus Brachygastra. These include a prominent and projecting scutellum which, coupled with the metanotum and propodeum, form a vertical and flat thorax. Furthermore, the first tergum (abdominal segment) is short and cap-shaped. The second tergum, due to its large size, will conceal any successive terga, which gives these wasps a short appearance.

=== Variation ===
On top of more yellow coloration to signify caste differences, B. scutellaris shows continuous variation in bodily coloration ranging from fully black and fully yellow. The most common form of the wasp is presented in a mostly yellow abdomen (scutellum and metanotum) lined with pale and narrow bands. This form is extensively seen throughout Peru. As one moves to British Guiana, Bolivia, Ecuador and Brazil, the distinct yellow coloration of B. scutellaris is observably reduced.

On the other side of the spectrum, fully black B. scutellaris individuals are observed in Brazil. Both fully black and fully yellow individuals are found in Colombia. Though displaying a wide range of bodily coloration, these different variations of B. scutellaris must necessarily be grouped into a single species, as there is a distinct lack of difference in form and structure.

=== Sex identification ===
Both male and female B. scutellaris can range from 5–9mm with a wing length range of 5–9mm as well. Coloration varies for both sexes based on geographic location and environmental influences; B. scutellaris can range from fully black to fully yellow and anything variation in-between. Female heads have curved antennae and a mandible with two types of teeth: 3 large and acute, and 2 that are low, rounded and blunt. Males present shorter antennae as well as male genitalia with paramere 2–3x as long as high. Male abdomens have large punctures separated with a rough surface of tergum 2 whereas females have small punctures and a smooth surface of tergum 2. Lastly, males are observed to present more yellow pigmentation than females.

== Distribution and habitat ==
B. scutellaris is most commonly found in Bolivia, Costa Rica, and Peru ranging in altitudes from 175m–700m. It is most commonly found in humid and forested areas and more specifically, the Atlantic forest. The Atlantic Forest is a 4,000 km^{2} terrestrial biome along the Atlantic coast characterized by mostly tropical and subtropical rainforest and tropical and subtropical grasslands, savannas and shrub-lands. B. scutellaris has a similar distribution to relatives B. smithii and B. augusti, though it does not spread into Paraguay and Argentina.

Wasps of the genus Brachygastra create nests in trees. Its composition varies between short chips or fibers that eventually form a brown and brittle home. Their nests are seemingly without order, often arranged without pattern and with a varying number of entrances. While the primary comb is attached to the tree, it acts as an anchor to all subsequent, secondary combs, which can, as well, be orderly or chaotically constructed.

== Colony cycle ==
Characteristic to B. scutellaris is its inherent swarm-founding behavior, which presents in the form of a large group of workers and several queens initiating a new colony. Consequently, B. scutellaris will display mostly polygynous behavior. The colony cycle is the developmental period between one reproductive episode and the next. As part of the Epiponini tribe, B. scutellaris colonies will fluctuate between oligogyny and polygyny throughout the colony cycle. This oscillating property of the Epiponini colony cycle allows for greater genetic relatedness among the nest. The mechanism for queen selection in this process is unknown but is hypothesized that larger females are selected due to a higher expected fitness.

== Morphology ==
=== Reproductive caste morphology ===
B. scutellaris is observed to have 3 separate and distinct reproductive castes: queens, intermediates and workers. Workers are the most populous of individuals followed by intermediates and queens respectively. Intermediates are females that are not inseminated with partially developed ovaries.

Dimorphism between queens and non-queens is clear with queens having a mean wing length of 2.71mm versus 2.57mm and 2.62mm for intermediates and workers respectively. We also see a stark difference in number of hamulus, which are small bristle-like hooks on the anterior part of the wing. Queens were found to display significantly more hamulus than non-queens with 7.5 hooks versus 7.2 hooks. There was also found to be a positive correlation between yellow coloration and ovarian development.

There are also clear morphological differences between male and female B. scutellaris. Though the two are generally similar, there are a few stark differences that signify sexual dimorphism. Males have a smaller and more convex clypeus (shield-shaped part of the head), a more punctured and narrow abdomen, and a bright yellow spot on their abdomen that is usually indicative of sex.

=== Larvae morphology ===
Though adults have been widely catalogued in B. scutellaris, there has been very little research on the actual morphology of the larva. Lengths of B. scutellaris larvae include 5.7mm – 7.8mm with a maximum width of 2.2mm – 3.5mm. As the head is less developed, the head capsule is significantly softer than those of adults. Bands and lines on the abdomen are not yet developed and are weakly indicated.

== Behavior ==
=== Honey storage ===
B. scutellaris are honey wasps and will thus display honey storing behavior characteristic of its genus Brachygastra. This honey-storing pattern includes storing honey in empty cells in order to act as a food reserve. Because of the biome in which B. scutellaris is found, the honey it stores acts as a reserve for the nest for the entire year.

Mexican natives are known to maintain nests in a semidomestic manner in order to harvest their honey stores.

=== Predation and defense ===
Though most social wasps like B. scutellaris will suffer from heavy vertebrate predation i.e. birds; ant predation on wasp nests is the most frequent and is considered to be the driving evolutionary force for their nests. Their nests are frequently attacked because their eggs and larvae are concentrated and exposed in the combs. Furthermore, due to the sessile nature of their nests, it makes it difficult for escape. Thus these social wasp nests are a heavily desired source of food for predators.

Raids of Eciton (army ants) are cited as the most severe of attacks on the nest. Though Eciton raids are low in frequency, when they do occur, the entire brood is often decimated. Swarm-founding species like B. scutellaris will actually lay their eggs before their nest envelope is finished thus leaving their young unguarded to any foraging ants. However, due to the swarm-nature of the colony, the high numbers of workers will serve as guards for during this vulnerable stage of nest construction and egg-laying. After the envelope is constructed, only a narrow entrance needs to be constructed and thus fewer workers are allocated to defend against predation.

Guard B. scutellaris will position strategically on the edges of the entrance. On top of position, these individuals will also put their antennae and heads in a forward position in order to track movement outside the nest.

=== Nest ===
==== Nest evolution ====
As seen antecedently, B. scutellaris often falls prey to Eciton raids, which, however infrequently occur, have devastating results. Unlike many of their eusocial relatives who have developed chemical defenses through self-produced ant repellants, which they excrete around the nest, B. scutellaris must adapt through nest evolution.

The first variation of evolutionary response and most pertinent to B. scutellaris involves better choice of nest location. Locations that are less frequented by ants will ultimately result in higher fitness for the nest because they effectively give the colony and more importantly, the helpless larvae time to develop into functional adults. This can be accomplished through nesting in high locations, on leaves instead of twigs and nesting in buildings (as ants frequent them less than natural substrates).

Though less pertinent to B. scutellaris and members of the genus Brachygastra, it is worth mentioning that the other referenced forms of nest evolution include: shortening the colony cycle, increasing tolerance of frequent destructive attacks, and evolving defenses (e.g. chemical defense).

==== Nest construction ====
As part of the genus Brachygastra, B. scutellaris will have a sessile initiation onto a plant or tree upon which they will build the primary comb. Anchored to this will be the secondary combs built in seemingly random order. More specifically, B. scutellaris will build a Phragmocyttarous nest, which is characterized by a horizontal primary comb, covered by an envelope. Sessile to this primary comb will be secondary combs will be all subsequent combs, however, under the protection of the envelope.

A technique called surface-building is used by workers where thicken the side surfaces of the upper combs (more primary) which, in turn, will strengthen the support for the lower and secondary combs. Moreover, wasps of the genus Brachygastra will specifically use surface-building to increase carton thickness. Surface-building is accomplished by allocating supplementary pulp to the envelope's surface then subsequently pressed in, in order to create a smooth surface.
