= Ulkeus intricatus =

Scientific classification
- Kingdom: Animalia
- Phylum: Arthropoda
- Class: Insecta
- Order: Coleoptera
- Suborder: Polyphaga
- Infraorder: Staphyliniformia
- Family: Histeridae
- Genus: Ulkeus
- Species: U. intricatus

Binomial name
- Ulkeus intricatus Horn, 1885

Species of beetle

Ulkeus intricatus is a species of clown beetle in the family Histeridae. It is found in North America.
