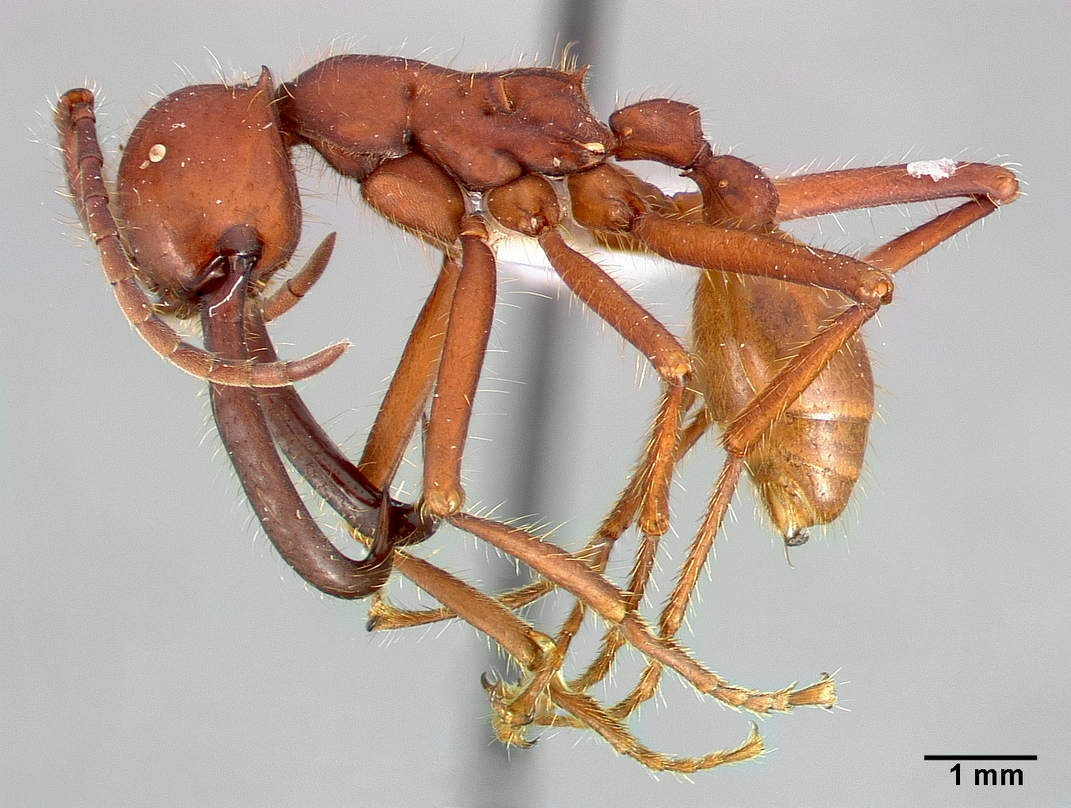
- Eciton mexicanum major worker

Scientific classification
- Domain: Eukaryota
- Kingdom: Animalia
- Phylum: Arthropoda
- Class: Insecta
- Order: Hymenoptera
- Family: Formicidae
- Genus: Eciton
- Species: E. mexicanum

Binomial name
- Eciton mexicanum Roger, 1863

Subspecies
- E. m. argentinum; E. m. goianum; E. m. latidens; E. m. mexicanum; E. m. moralum; E. m. panamense

= Eciton mexicanum =

Species of ant

Eciton mexicanum is a species of New World army ant in the genus Eciton. Present from Mexico to throughout Costa Rica and northern Argentina, it is found in dry and wet forests in sea level to montane areas. Raids always occur in columns, tending to be usually nocturnal but are sometimes also encountered during the day. It is closely related to the Eciton burchellii species.
