= Reninus =

Scientific classification
- Kingdom: Animalia
- Phylum: Arthropoda
- Class: Insecta
- Order: Coleoptera
- Suborder: Polyphaga
- Infraorder: Staphyliniformia
- Family: Histeridae
- Subfamily: Haeteriinae
- Genus: Reninus; Lewis, 1889

Genus of beetles

Reninus is a genus of clown beetles in the family Histeridae. There are about 13 described species in Reninus.

== Species ==
These 13 species belong to the genus Reninus:

- Reninus amazoniae (Lewis, 1898)
- Reninus arechavaletae (Marseul, 1870)
- Reninus breyeri Bruch, 1940
- Reninus bruchi Reichensperger, 1927
- Reninus curvatus (Lewis, 1912)
- Reninus distinguendus Desbordes, 1923
- Reninus meticulosus (Lewis, 1885)
- Reninus puncticollis Lewis, 1907
- Reninus pygidialis (Reichensperger, 1926)
- Reninus salvini (Lewis, 1888)
- Reninus seminitens Schmidt, 1893
- Reninus turritus Lewis, 1902
- Reninus wagneri Desbordes, 1923
