= Pinaxister decipiens =

Scientific classification
- Kingdom: Animalia
- Phylum: Arthropoda
- Class: Insecta
- Order: Coleoptera
- Suborder: Polyphaga
- Infraorder: Staphyliniformia
- Family: Histeridae
- Genus: Pinaxister
- Species: P. decipiens

Binomial name
- Pinaxister decipiens (Horn, 1883)

Species of beetle

Pinaxister decipiens is a species of clown beetle in the family Histeridae. It is found in North America.
