= Hippeutister =

Scientific classification
- Kingdom: Animalia
- Phylum: Arthropoda
- Class: Insecta
- Order: Coleoptera
- Suborder: Polyphaga
- Infraorder: Staphyliniformia
- Family: Histeridae
- Subfamily: Haeteriinae
- Genus: Hippeutister; Reichensperger, 1935

Genus of beetles

Hippeutister is a genus of clown beetles in the family Histeridae. There are about six described species in Hippeutister.

== Species ==
These six species belong to the genus Hippeutister:

- Hippeutister amabilis (Wenzel, 1938)
- Hippeutister californicus Caterino & Tishechkin, 2008
- Hippeutister castaneus (Lewis, 1891)
- Hippeutister manicatus (Lewis, 1891)
- Hippeutister plaumanni Reichensperger, 1936
- Hippeutister solisi Caterino & Tishechkin, 2008
