= Pinaxister =

Scientific classification
- Kingdom: Animalia
- Phylum: Arthropoda
- Class: Insecta
- Order: Coleoptera
- Suborder: Polyphaga
- Infraorder: Staphyliniformia
- Family: Histeridae
- Subfamily: Haeteriinae
- Genus: Pinaxister; Reichensperger, 1939

Genus of beetles

Pinaxister is a genus of clown beetles in the family Histeridae. There are at least four described species in Pinaxister.

== Species ==
These four species belong to the genus Pinaxister:

- Pinaxister decipiens (Horn, 1883)
- Pinaxister henricischmidti Reichensperger, 1939
- Pinaxister peninsularis (Mann, 1924)
- Pinaxister setiger (J. E. LeConte, 1860)
