= Renclasea =

Scientific classification
- Kingdom: Animalia
- Phylum: Arthropoda
- Class: Insecta
- Order: Coleoptera
- Suborder: Polyphaga
- Infraorder: Staphyliniformia
- Family: Histeridae
- Subfamily: Haeteriinae
- Genus: Renclasea; Tishechkin & Caterino, 2009

Genus of beetles

Renclasea is a genus of clown beetles in the family Histeridae. There are about six described species in Renclasea.

== Species ==
These six species belong to the genus Renclasea:

- Renclasea cazieri Tishechkin & Caterino, 2009
- Renclasea falli Tishechkin & Caterino, 2009
- Renclasea helavai Tishechkin & Caterino, 2009
- Renclasea mexicana Tishechkin & Caterino, 2009
- Renclasea occidentalis Tishechkin & Caterino, 2009
- Renclasea skelleyi Tishechkin & Caterino, 2009
