= Aritaerius =

Scientific classification
- Kingdom: Animalia
- Phylum: Arthropoda
- Class: Insecta
- Order: Coleoptera
- Suborder: Polyphaga
- Infraorder: Staphyliniformia
- Family: Histeridae
- Subfamily: Haeteriinae
- Genus: Aritaerius; Kovarik & Tishechkin, 2004

Genus of beetles

Aritaerius is a genus of clown beetles in the family Histeridae. There is one described species in Aritaerius, A. pallidus.
