= Renclasea falli =

Scientific classification
- Kingdom: Animalia
- Phylum: Arthropoda
- Class: Insecta
- Order: Coleoptera
- Suborder: Polyphaga
- Infraorder: Staphyliniformia
- Family: Histeridae
- Genus: Renclasea
- Species: R. falli

Binomial name
- Renclasea falli Tishechkin & Caterino, 2009

Species of beetle

Renclasea falli is a species of clown beetle in the family Histeridae. It is found in North America.

They belong to the clown beetle family Histeridae, whose members are typically small predatory beetles that feed on other insects and larvae in decaying organic material.

Clown beetles in this family are commonly found in habitats such as dung, carrion, forest litter, and under bark throughout their range in North America and elsewhere.
