= Hippeutister californicus =

Scientific classification
- Kingdom: Animalia
- Phylum: Arthropoda
- Class: Insecta
- Order: Coleoptera
- Suborder: Polyphaga
- Infraorder: Staphyliniformia
- Family: Histeridae
- Genus: Hippeutister
- Species: H. californicus

Binomial name
- Hippeutister californicus Caterino & Tishechkin, 2008

Species of beetle

Hippeutister californicus is a species of clown beetle in the family Histeridae. It is found in North America. It was discovered with an ant colony of Solenopsis amblychila.
