= Reninus salvini =

Scientific classification
- Kingdom: Animalia
- Phylum: Arthropoda
- Class: Insecta
- Order: Coleoptera
- Suborder: Polyphaga
- Infraorder: Staphyliniformia
- Family: Histeridae
- Genus: Reninus
- Species: R. salvini

Binomial name
- Reninus salvini (Lewis, 1888)

Species of beetle

Reninus salvini is a species of clown beetle in the family Histeridae. It is found in Central America and North America.
