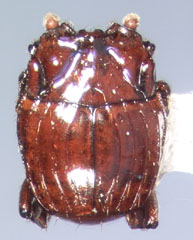

Scientific classification
- Kingdom: Animalia
- Phylum: Arthropoda
- Class: Insecta
- Order: Coleoptera
- Suborder: Polyphaga
- Infraorder: Staphyliniformia
- Family: Histeridae
- Subfamily: Haeteriinae
- Genus: Ulkeus; Horn, 1885

= Ulkeus =

Genus of beetles

Ulkeus is a genus of clown beetles in the family Histeridae. There are about six described species in Ulkeus.

== Species ==
These six species belong to the genus Ulkeus:

- Ulkeus discrepans (Reichensperger, 1939)
- Ulkeus gratianus (Bruch, 1926)
- Ulkeus henrici (Reichensperger, 1939)
- Ulkeus intricatus Horn, 1885
- Ulkeus pheidoliphilus (Bruch, 1930)
- Ulkeus sahlbergi (Schmidt, 1893)
