= Bivouac (ants) =

Type of ants' nest

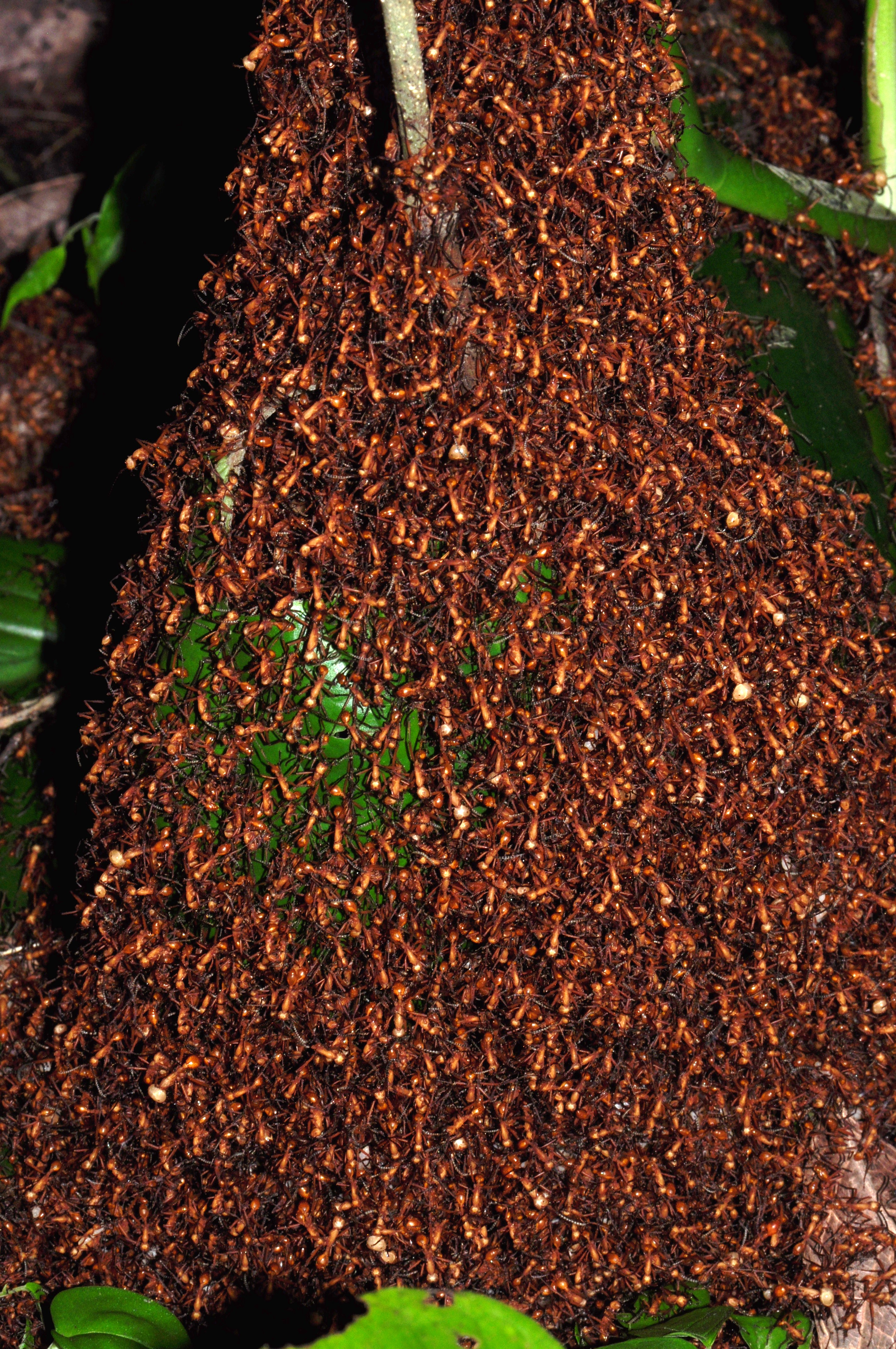
Army ant bivouac.

A bivouac is an organic structure formed by migratory driver ant and army ant colonies, such as the species Eciton burchellii. A nest is constructed out of the living ant workers' own bodies to protect the queen and larvae, and is later deconstructed as the ants move on.

Army ants can forage and feed on insects over large areas of more than 1,800 square yards in a single day, so they must constantly move to new areas. During what is called the migratory phase, the ants set up bivouacs at new sites each night. As many as 150,000 to 700,000 worker bodies cover and protect the queen, linking legs and bodies in a mass that measures a meter across. Thousands of larvae are located near the centre with the queen, and workers are responsible for feeding them. Larger workers also serve as porters, carrying larvae to new bivouacs. In the morning, the bivouac dissolves into raiding columns that form a fan-shaped front. These raiding columns can travel up to 20 metres per hour with lead workers laying a chemical trail for other workers to follow. Smaller workers lead the column, while larger, formidable soldiers protect the flanks.
