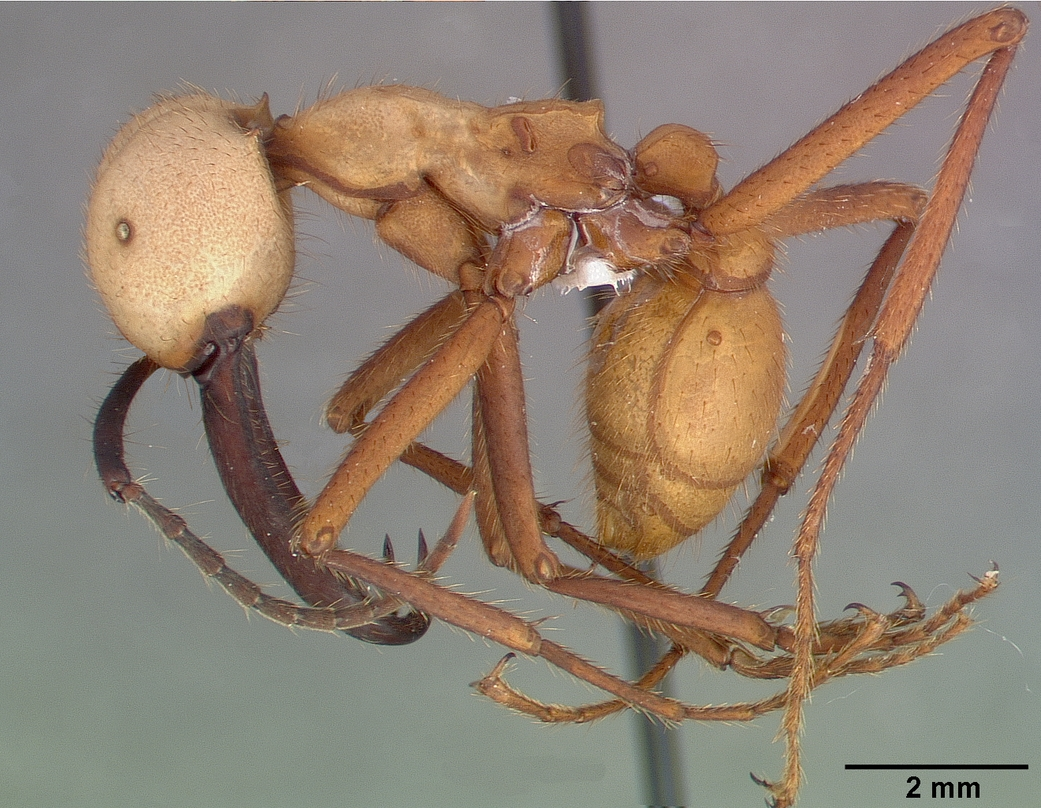
- Soldier of Eciton burchellii

Scientific classification
- Kingdom: Animalia
- Phylum: Arthropoda
- Clade: Pancrustacea
- Class: Insecta
- Order: Hymenoptera
- Family: Formicidae
- Clade: Doryloformicia
- Subfamily: Dorylinae
- Genus: Eciton
- Species: E. burchellii

Binomial name
- Eciton burchellii Westwood, 1842

Subspecies
- E. b. cupiens Santschi, 1923; E. b. urichi Forel, 1899; E. b. foreli Mayr, 1886; E. b. parvispinum Forel, 1899

= Eciton burchellii =

Species of ant

Eciton burchellii is a species of New World army ant in the genus Eciton. This species performs expansive, organized swarm raids that give it the informal name, Eciton army ant. This species displays a high degree of worker polymorphism.

== Description ==
=== Castes ===
Sterile workers are of four discrete size-castes: minors, medias, porters (sub-majors), and soldiers (majors). Soldiers have much larger heads and specialized mandibles for defense.

=== Nests ===
In lieu of underground excavated nests, colonies of E. burchellii form temporary living nests known as bivouacs, which are composed of hanging live worker bodies and which can be disassembled and relocated during colony emigrations. Eciton burchellii colonies cycle between stationary phases and nomadic phases when the colony emigrates nightly. These alternating phases of emigration frequency are governed by coinciding brood developmental stages.

=== Foraging behaviors ===
Group foraging efforts known as "raids" are maintained by the use of pheromones, can be 200 metres (660 ft) long, and employ up to 200,000 ants. Workers are also adept at making living structures out of their own bodies to improve efficiency of moving as a group across the forest floor while foraging or emigrating. Workers can fill "potholes" in the foraging trail with their own bodies, and can also form living bridges. Over 500 other species have been found living around the ant colonies, more than for any other individual species, with over 300 thought to be dependent on E. burchellii. These include numerous antbirds that follow raids and catch fleeing prey, parasitic mites that live on the ants, beetles that mimic the ants and beetles that feed on their refuse. In terms of geographical distribution, this species is found in the Amazon jungle and Central America.

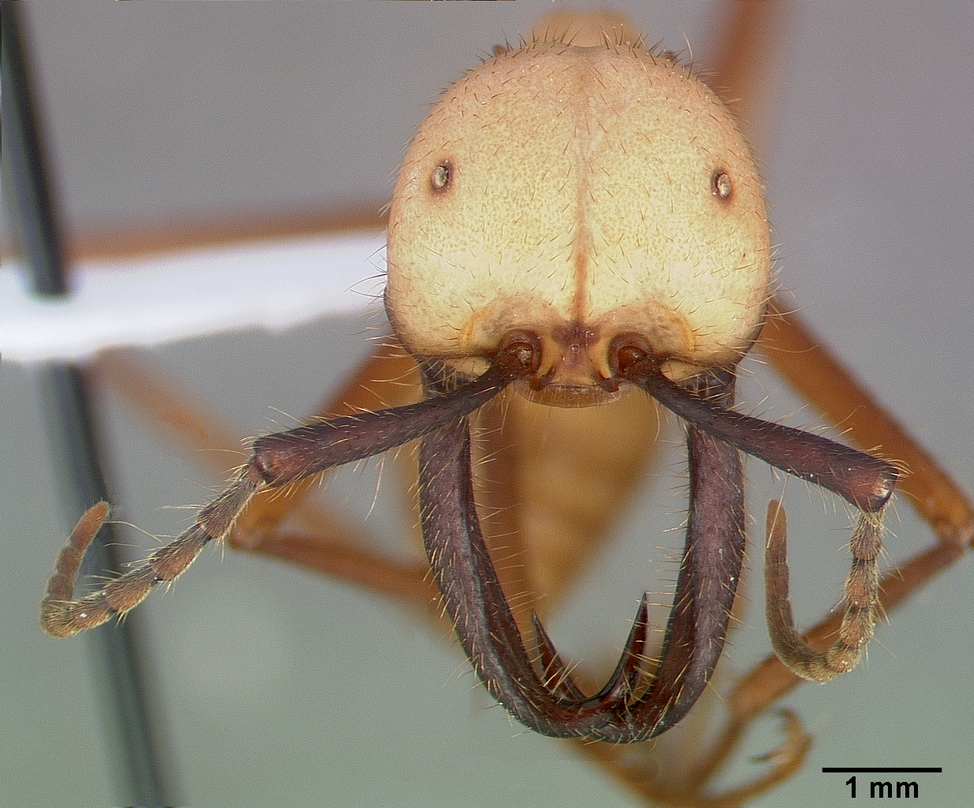
Head view of a soldier with characteristically shaped mandibles

Unlike most ant species, Eciton burchellii is polymorphic, meaning that features amongst smaller groups within the colony vary in size: a colony contains workers ranging from 3 mm to 12 mm, with each specific "caste" suited to specialized tasks. At least four castes of workers exist in its social system. Like other species of Eciton, Eciton burchellii features a highly modified soldier caste bearing long, pointed, characteristically falcate (sickle-shaped) mandibles. These features are much larger than on the "porter caste", the caste directly below that of the major "soldiers". Their long legs and elongated body lend them a spider-like appearance. Color varies from deep golden to dark brown. Workers possess single-faceted compound eyes, double-segmented waists, a well-developed sting, and specialized tarsal hooks on their feet with which they cling to one another to form bridges and bivouacs.

=== Range ===
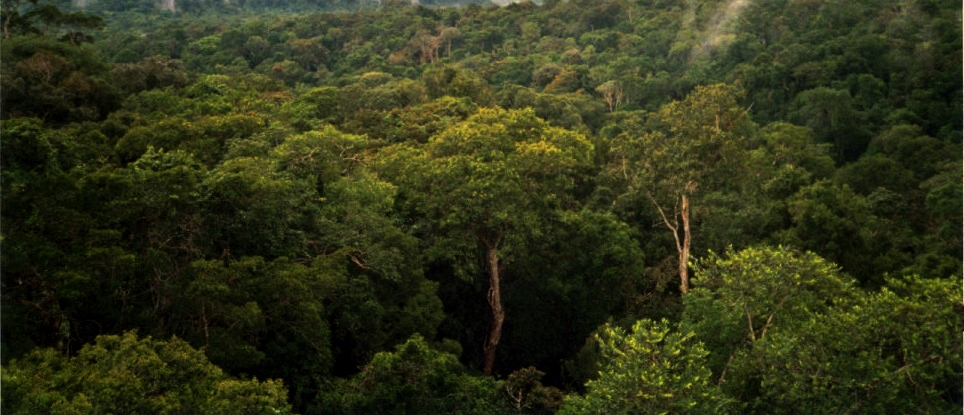
Overhead view of the Amazon forest

Eciton burchellii ants are found in the tropical jungles of Central and South America, from Mexico to Paraguay. This species dwells in damp and well-shaded areas, avoiding direct sunlight and high elevations.

=== Taxonomy ===
The species was referred to as Eciton burchellii in the original publication. The double i was subsequently deemed unnecessary in the later 1800s by taxonomists, and hence the name became Eciton burchelli. Recent taxonomic rules, however, adhere more strictly to the original form; the name Eciton burchelli is now largely regarded as invalid.

== Colony structure ==
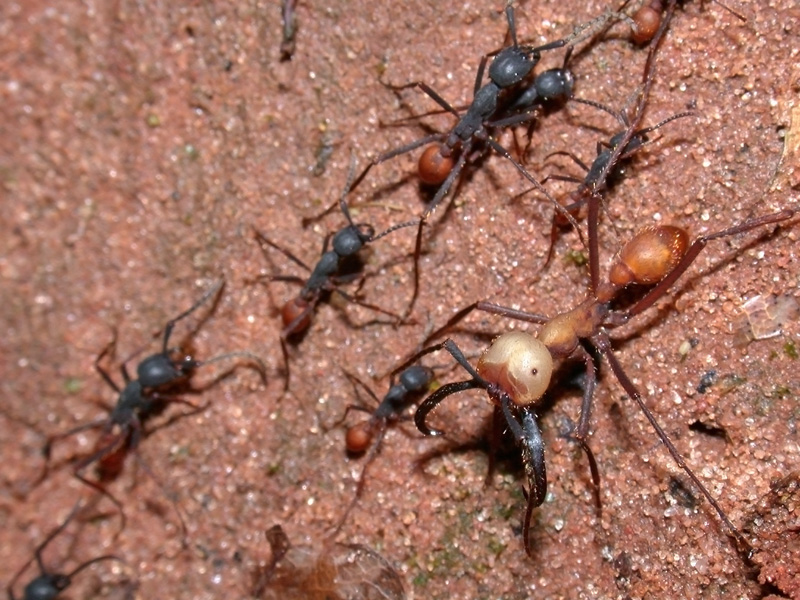
Size differences between the major workers and minors

Colonies may be quite large, accommodating as many as 100,000 to 600,000 adult individuals. Each colony consists of a single queen, a brood of developing young, and many adult workers. The adult workers make up the majority of the population. There are four distinct physical worker castes. The queen usually copulates with 10–20 males, which leads to a colony with a large number of worker patrilines, which are full-sibling families with the same father and mother. When a colony's size reaches a maximum, it can result in a split in the colony, with the old queen heading one resultant swarm and a daughter heading the other.

=== Caste determination ===
The diet and physical upbringing vary among the colony's larvae and is known to determine the physical characteristics of the adult insect. However, caste system determination has also been shown to be influenced by genetic differences. In a study of Eciton burchellii by Jaffé et al. (2007), each individual patriline in 5 colonies was examined. The researchers saw that each patriline had a significantly skewed proclivity for a certain caste, showing that there is considerable evidence for a genetic based caste determination amongst each patriline. These genetic components have been shown not only in Eciton burchellii, but across numerous other ant species—where queens mate with many males, known as polyandry, or where several queens lead a single colony, known as polygyny.

== Nesting ==
Unlike other Hymenoptera species, ants cannot actively thermoregulate through processes such as evaporation, fanning, or incubation. Therefore, they must rely on the location and architecture of their nests in order to regulate their temperature. For species of ants that migrate frequently, such as the Eciton burchellii, the location of the nest may be the most important thermoregulation tool. However, Eciton burchellii does not construct a physical nest. Instead, it builds a living nest out of the individual colony members (called a bivouac). Thermoregulation within these bivouacs is accomplished through the opening or sealing of airways. The colony members can also manipulate the bivouac to avoid rainfall or direct sunlight. Bivouacs are often found in hollow logs, animal burrows in the ground, and hanging in trees. During each nomadic phase, a new nesting site must be found. On average, it takes a colony six to eight hours to move their bivouac. This occurs primarily during the night.

== Foraging practices ==
Besides being group predators, members of an Eciton burchellii colony cycle between nomadic and stationary (or "statary") phases. During the twenty-day stationary phase, the pupae and newly laid eggs develop, and the colony goes on raids about every other day. During the fifteen-day nomadic phase, initiated after the eggs hatch and the pupae eclose, the colony goes on raids once every day. Each raid requires approximately one third of the colony, employing up to 200,000 members. The raids can be up to 20 meters in width and 200 meters in length. The raids never occupy the same area twice, so the trail to each new location is always changing. Eciton burchellii colonies avoid locations where they and other colonies have already foraged. This way, they ensure that there are available resources in their foraging area and they avoid any aggressive conspecific encounters. The inbound ants on the trail deliver prey that was captured by the outbound swarming ants.

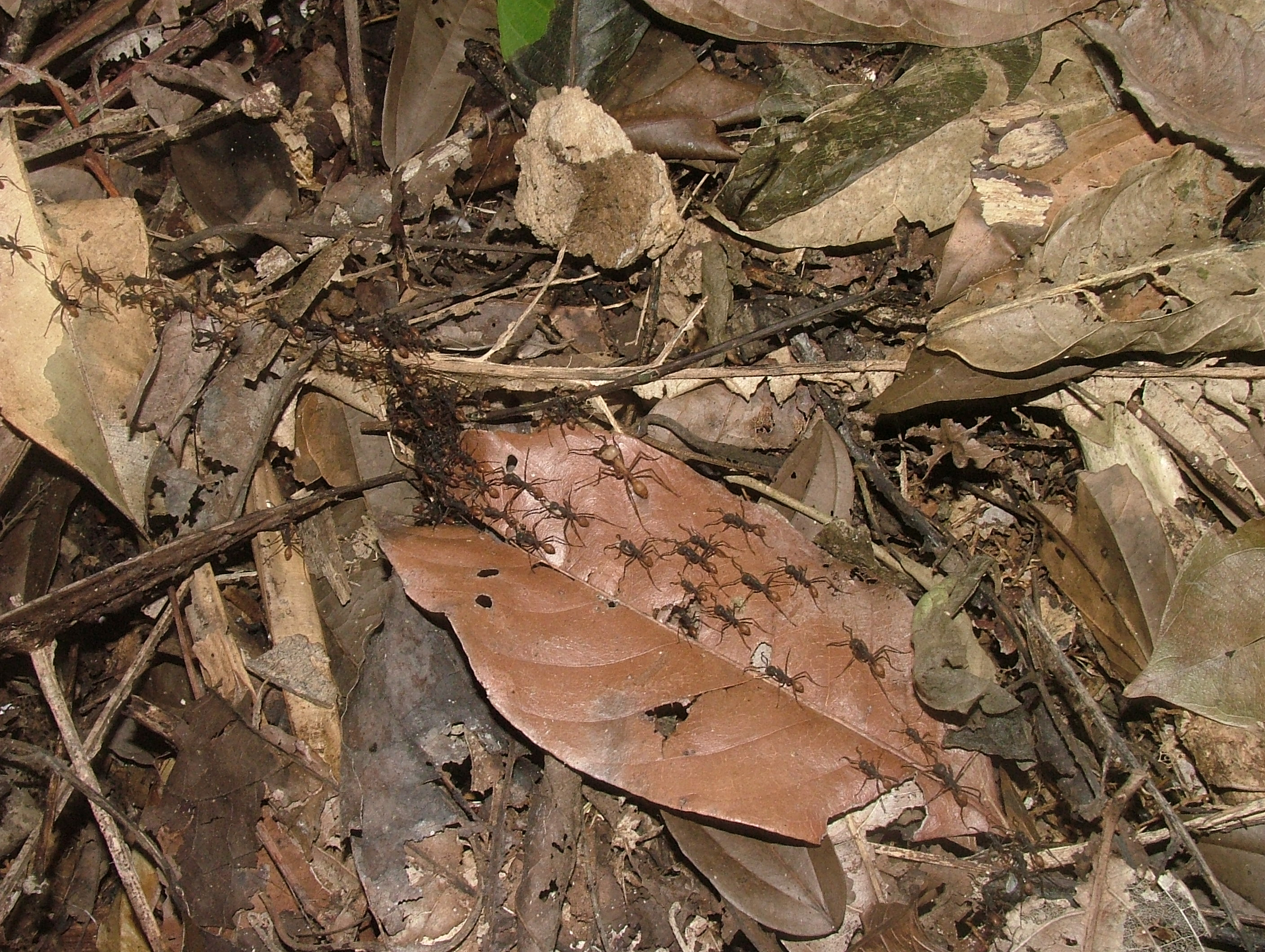
A trail of foraging Eciton burchellii

Eciton burchellii raids move as a loose swarm over the leaf litter. This allows for smaller prey to take shelter in the crevices of the leaf litter to hide from the oncoming ants. Since numerous insects and other small prey can escape the swarm, the frequent raids of the ants do not completely deplete an area's prey reserves. This chronic predation by the colonies will evolutionarily favor insects and other prey that possess adaptions to counteract the ants, such as chemical weaponry for defense or those that sexually mature at a smaller size. Since the larger Eciton burchellii ants require more prey for energy than other smaller ant colonies, only high biomass patches of prey will provide them with enough food. If the prey density in an area is too small, the colony may be forced to abandon the area and move on.

During their raids, Eciton burchellii have also been known to predate wasp nests of species such as Polistes erythrocephalus. These attacks often involve the destruction of the wasp nest as Eciton burchellii consume the larva and pupa. Eciton burchellii are also known to prey on wasp species like Brachygastra scutellaris – they are the most severe predators of the wasp and their raids have the most devastating of results. B. scutellaris' only mode of defense from these Eciton raids is attempting to find more elusive nesting locations.

Eciton burchellii ant colonies use pheromones to maintain a straight foraging pathway. The ants can detect the pheromones with their antennae and can tell the difference in concentration gradients of the pheromones as they move away from the center of the trail. Also, individuals who are outbound, turn to avoid the inbound ants more frequently, giving the prey-burdened ants the right-of-way on the trail.

Members of the species have been observed to use their bodies to fill potholes in the pathway between the nest and prey. By filling these obstacles, the ants greatly increase the overall prey-laden traffic back to the nest. Each ant will walk to a hole and measure itself to see if it fits; if it does, it will lie across the hole motionless to allow other members of the colony to cross at a higher speed. If it does not fit, it will continue past the hole and allow another ant to check. Ants will also cooperate, with multiple ants forming a plug, if one ant is too small for the hole. Once in place in a hole, the ant(s) can stay there for many hours or until it is dark and the traffic flow has diminished greatly, at which point they will return to the nest. This behavior most likely formed among members of the Eciton burchelli species because of its evolutionary advantage. An increase in trail speed and efficiency leads to a larger daily prey intake by the colony. This raises the colony's collective fitness, allowing for faster reproduction.

=== Abiotic factors influencing foraging ===
Ants, in general, are excellent organisms to study differences in thermal ecology for a number of reasons: they are ectothermic, can be collected easily, their environmental temperatures can be manipulated, and they can be held in captivity for extended periods of time. Eciton burchellii colonies have been found to inhabit areas with no direct sunlight, regulate their bivouac's temperature and airflow, and prefer the closed-canopy forest environment over a fragmented one. Temperature has been found to be the largest contributing factor to whether or not a swarm will cross into the open from a forest edge. When the ants meet an excessively hot patch, they will accelerate their movement, "shuttling" to minimize their exposure to the heat. If the temperature is too hot (>43 degrees Celsius), the ants will abandon that path and look for a new, cooler one. If need be, the ants retreat to the cool, humid bare soil or huddle beneath stones and logs in order to recover from the endurance of high temperatures. This "cooling off" behavior has been observed to last upwards of 30 minutes in some colonies.

==== Effects of forest clearing ====
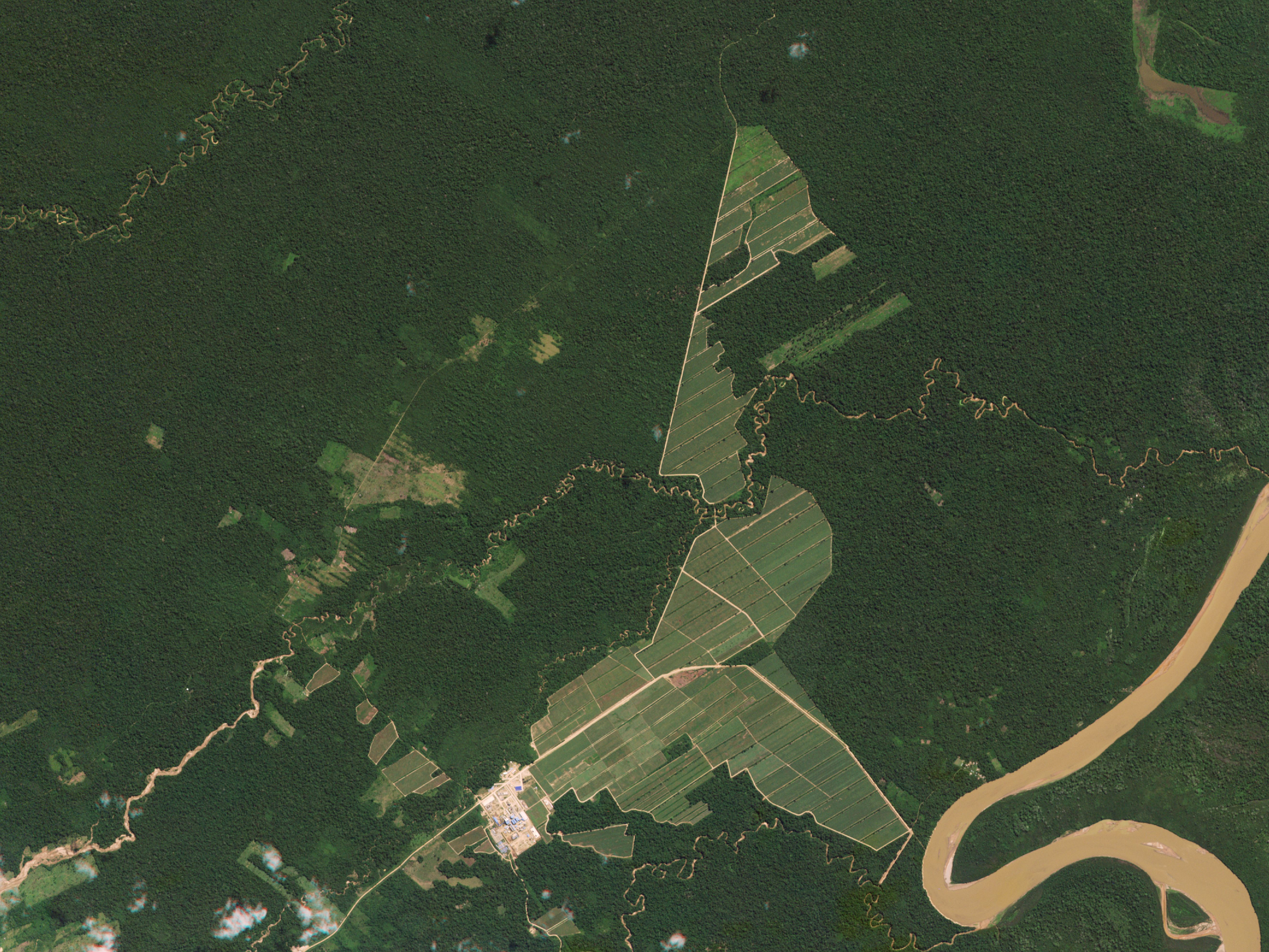
Deforestation on the Amazon Forest in Bolivia, 2016.

Tropical forest clearing efforts by humans has detrimented the survival of Eciton burchellii colonies. Since they are above-ground foragers, they are extremely sensitive to forest clearing and habitat destruction. These habitats have more variable ground-level temperatures, exposure to direct sunlight, and increased visibility. Insects, in general, are very vulnerable to the effects of dehydration because of their large surface area to volume ratio. Survival in the exposed conditions brought about by forest clearing is physiologically difficult.

The male Eciton burchellii are extremely affected by a fragmented forest habitat. Even though the males can fly, their dispersal is limited by the predation of nocturnal insectivores that can easily spot their larger bodies in the cleared forest patches. Also, the males seem to have no defenses, which contrasts greatly with the queen's hordes of stinging protectors. With the fragmented forest hindering the males' dispersal, gene flow is reduced among the Eciton burchellii populations.

Higher elevations were found to help alleviate some of the effects of the cleared forests because of the decreased temperature and increased cloud cover. However, the amount of above-ground raids were shown to decrease with an increase in elevation. No Eciton burchellii colonies were found above 23.8 degrees North.

==== Effects of pheromones and weather ====
In general, Eciton burchellii colonies do not follow the compass bearing of the previous day's raids based on pheromone trails. Additionally, rainfall has been shown to delay the colony's bivouac movement, sometimes for many days. Heavy rains have been observed to alter the foraging trails and movement patterns.

=== Alarm behavior ===
Social animals need an alarm system to alert others to defend against potential threats or to recruit others to attack prey. In Eciton burchellii, along with other large-colony ant species, the alarm pheromone is produced in mandible glands. This is evolutionarily advantageous because the mandible has a large surface area for pheromone's evaporation, the pheromone is released whenever the mandible is opened for biting, and the pheromone is rapidly released when the ant's head is crushed. The specific pheromone used by the Eciton burchellii species is 4-methyl-3-heptanone, which produces an intense, but short-lived, behavioral response by others in the colony.

== Antbirds and kleptoparasitism ==
There are many species of birds that use the foraging practices of the Eciton burchellii as a source of food. When the ant colony swarms the forest leaf litter, arthropods flee, which are then eaten by the birds, lizards, insects, and even some mammals that attend the raids. However, this source of food can be unpredictable, as the Eciton burchellii colonies' raiding zones are always shifting. It has been shown that the obligate army ant-following antbird Phaenostictus mcleannani uses a network of individuals to locate swarms. Each mated pair of birds holds a single dominance zone that they control, which is part of a larger non-exclusive feeding zone occupied by other mated pairs. Consequently, a single mated pair may track several colonies a day by drawing on the collective knowledge of this larger network. Departure calls can be used as cues to tell the other mate where the location of the raid is. However, it has been shown that there is little opportunity for kin selection to influence group feeding in the antbirds.

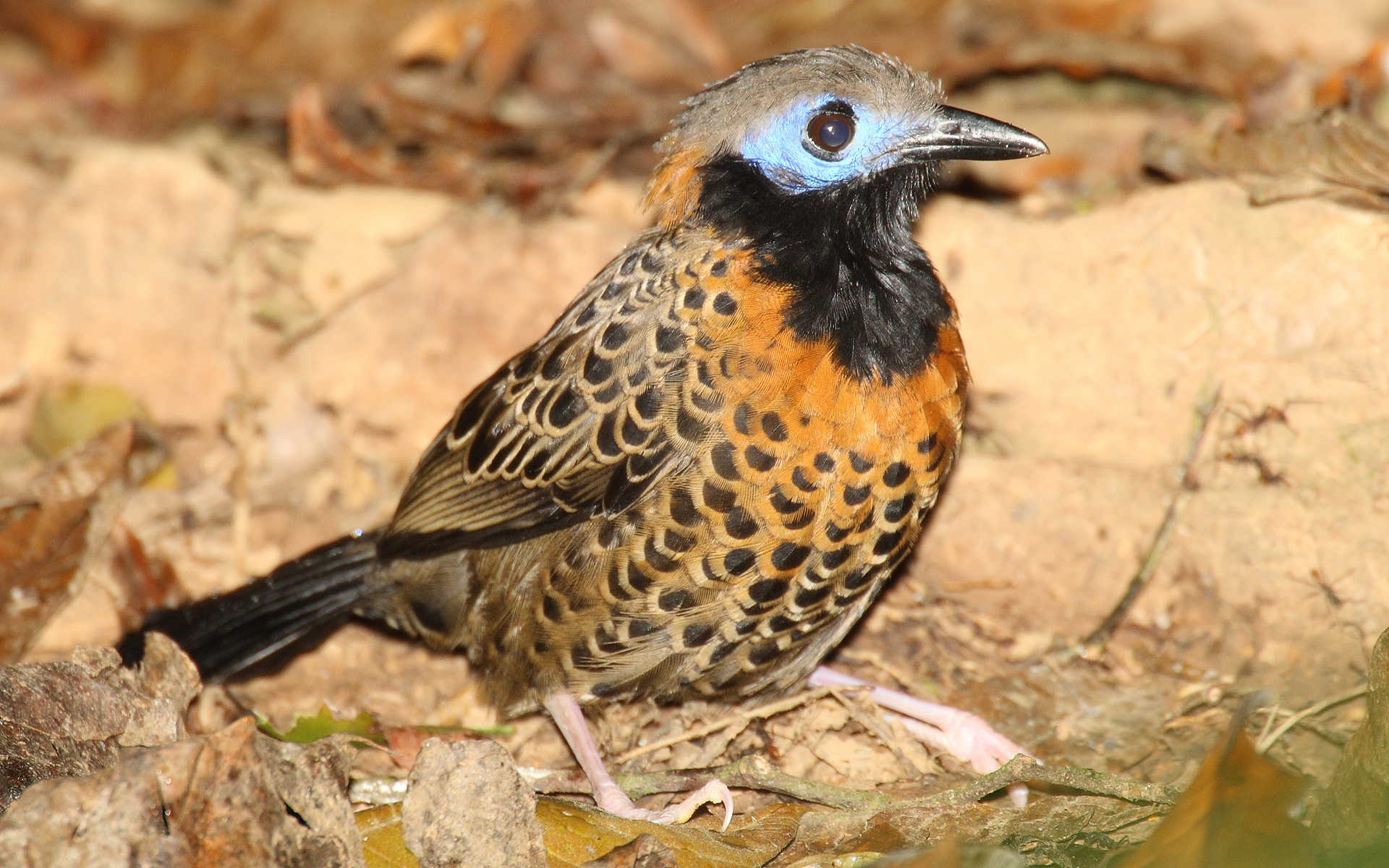
Phaenostictus mcleannani, an obligate army ant-following antbird

There are twenty-one species of antbirds that participate in "bivouac checking", which is a specialized behavior allowing for the antbirds to assess the Eciton burchellii colony's foraging activity and current location. This allows the antbirds to reduce the time spent tracking a colony that is not foraging. Through bivouac checking, the antbirds might be remembering the correct location of colonies and returning to them at the appropriate time in the colony's foraging cycle. This bivouac checking behavior may also be a more reliable method of determination of obligate kleptoparasites. A correlation was found between frequency of expression of checking behavior and dependency on ant colonies.

The antbirds have a parasitic relationship with Eciton burchellii which inflicts a cost that is proportional to the number of birds in the flock. This imposes a selective pressure on the colonies, as the arthropods collected from these raids represent nearly half of the food consumed by the ants. To counteract the antbird's kleptoparasitism, large prey items have been observed to be dragged under the leaf litter before being processed. Also, food caches arise along the foraging trail, protected by the colony's soldiers.

== Gene flow ==
The eusocial Hymenoptera order has a constrained effective population size compared to other orders. This is because each colony has only one or a small number of reproductive queens per colony compared to other species that have a greater number of reproductive individuals per unit area. The effective population size of Eciton burchellii is further constrained because of flightless queen ants and colony fission. This causes not only high colony population viscosity, but also restricted maternal gene flow among the colonies.

One inevitable consequence of colony fission is that male sex ratios are favored, which increases the chance for genetic drift among colonies and allows the species to become susceptible to inbreeding practices. However, this was not found to be true in Eciton burchellii populations. Research shows that these populations were capable of maintaining a high rate of gene flow because of the male individuals. High heterozygosity was also found, but no cases of inbreeding. This is accomplished by the males flying at least one kilometer away from their home population to mate with a neighboring colony's queen, thereby minimizing the chances of procreating with a related queen. Also, the monthly migrations of these ant populations help spur enhanced gene flow and eliminate the harmful effects of small breeding population sizes.

== Associated species ==
A total of 557 different species of animal have been found to associate in some way with E. burchellii, the greatest number known for any individual species. An even larger number of species have been recorded living with the ants, but have not yet been identified. Although some of the associations are likely to be opportunistic, around 300 of the species are thought to be reliant on E. burchellii in some form to survive. The species is commonly attended by "ant following" birds, such as antbirds and woodcreepers. Insects and other arthropods attempting to escape from E. burchellii are flushed into the attending flocks, and a number of species have evolved behavior to obtain most of their food by following swarms. Butterflies are then attracted to the droppings of the birds following the ants, which they drink from. Stylogaster and Calodexia flies are abundant around raiding parties, laying eggs (or injecting larvae) on fleeing cockroaches; of the cockroaches that escape the ants, 50–90% are parasitised by the flies. Beetles that mimic the ants can be found in the bivouac and in columns.

Many mites live in the bivouacs and ant columns. On Barro Colorado Island, Panama, 5% of the 3156 worker ants examined had mites on them, with the Scutacaridae and Pygmephoridae families being the most abundant. The mites are mainly thought to be harmless to the ants, being symbionts rather than parasites. They most likely were present to exploit the hosts for mechanical transportation or to use their waste deposits.

The food gathered during a raid is fed to the individuals within a bivouac, but what is not eaten is thrown into a refuse deposit which is a source of food for many beetle species, particularly rove beetles (Staphylinidae).
