= Trichocylliba =

Scientific classification
- Domain: Eukaryota
- Kingdom: Animalia
- Phylum: Arthropoda
- Subphylum: Chelicerata
- Class: Arachnida
- Order: Mesostigmata
- Family: Uropodidae
- Genus: Trichocylliba; Berlese, 1905

Genus of mites

Trichocylliba is a genus of tortoise mites in the family Uropodidae. There are about seven described species in Trichocylliba.

== Species ==
These seven species belong to the genus Trichocylliba:

- Trichocylliba aguaboae Hirschmann, 1992
- Trichocylliba chiapensis Elzinga
- Trichocylliba napoensis Elzinga
- Trichocylliba praedator Elzinga
- Trichocylliba schneirlai Elzinga
- Trichocylliba suctorpoda Elzinga
- Trichocylliba watkinsi Elzinga
