= Statary =

Statary is a term currently applied in fields such as ecology, ethology, psychology. In modern use it contrasts on the one hand with such concepts as migratory, nomadic, or shifting, and on the other with static or immobile. The word also is of historical interest in its change of meaning as its usage changed.

== Current usage ==
In current usage in fields such as biology, statary commonly means in a particular location or state, but not rigidly so. Army ant colonies for example are said to be in a statary phase when they occupy one bivouac for an extended period instead of just overnight. This is as opposed to a nomadic phase, in which they travel and forage practically daily. This does not mean that ant colonies in a statary phase do not move nor even that they do not forage while statary; they often do both, sometimes daily. Correspondingly a colony in a nomadic phase does not travel without rest; it bivouacs for the night. The significance of the terms is that the colonies' behaviour patterns differ radically according to their activity phase; one pattern favours maintaining a persistent presence where brood is being raised, whereas the other favours continual nomadic wandering into new foraging grounds. Such phases have raised interest in studies in aspects of comparative psychology and evolution.

The term statary also applies in contexts other than ants or colonial organisms. Swarm-forming species of locusts go beyond having statary and nomadic phases of behaviour; their growing nymphs actually develop into different adult morphologies, depending on whether the conditions during their growth favour swarming or not. Locusts that adopt the swarming morphology are said to be the migratory morphs, while the rest are called statary morphs. Effectively similar morphs occur in some other insect species, such as army worm.

In some technical fields statary need not refer literally to location or motion, but refer figuratively to their having particular characteristic but non-rigid attributes, such as atmospheric pressure. The following section instances examples of such senses occurring in the history of the term.

== Historical usage ==
Statary, from the Latin root statarius, meaning "standing fast", first came into prominent use in the English language in Positions, the work of Richard Mulcaster in the sixteenth century. He spoke of statarie substance much as, in contemporary English, one might speak of fixed assets or fixed property: "...either rich or poore : landed or unlanded, which is either the having or wanting of the most statarie substance." It is unclear whether he coined the English version of the word.

Samuel Collins also used the word "statary" in the slightly different sense of "ordinary" or "normal" in his 1617 defence of the Bishop of Elie, Lancelot Andrewes: "What is this [in comparison], ... not ... to their stately, but even statarie and ordinarie supremacie in the Church?".

In his Pseudodoxia Epidemica Sir Thomas Browne used the word in at least two senses; firstly he used it as meaning fixed or regular, as in "...perturbed the observation of festivities and statary solemnities..." secondly he used it in contrast to anniversary (by which he meant "annual" or "seasonal") as in: "...we might expect a regularity in the winds; whereof though some be statary, some anniversary, and the rest do tend to determine points of heaven, yet do the blasts and undulary breaths thereof maintain no certainty in their course..." In this passage he explicitly does not assert the self-contradiction that winds might be static, but rather that they are unceasing, though variable. In this sense Browne's usage is consistent with the modern technical application.

The word statary appeared in sundry works after Browne's time, for example in the Literary Gazette in the Meteorological Journal, the word was used in reference to winds and barometric readings in much the same sense as that in which Browne had referred to statary winds.

Lancelot Addison referred to "statary prayers" in his account of his seven years in West Barbary, published in 1671. However, the word never seems to have come into common use, though it did appear in various dictionaries, such as Samuel Johnson's 1755 Dictionary of the English Language. Such entries did not generally refer to any distinction between the various senses, and in fact some used words such as "stationary" in their definitions, apparently feeling no need for a separate term for the concept of something that has a non-rigid general location around specific coordinates. Accordingly the word was marked as obsolete by the compilers of the Oxford English Dictionary published in the late 19th to early 20th century, and Webster's Dictionary did likewise in the 1913 unabridged edition. The Shorter Oxford English Dictionary in turn omitted the entry altogether. If it had not been resurrected in the role of a technical term, the word statary probably would have disappeared from the language by now. In the sense of "rigidly stationary" it patently is redundant, but in the sense of loosely remaining at particular coordinates, it fills a need in certain fields such as in biology and climatology.

A related sense appeared in the 1623 translation of Xenophon by John Bingham. As applied to soldiers, statary means: equipped for stationary combat as opposed to skirmishing.

Eventually, about the early 1930s, the word began to reappear in articles and textbooks, particularly on biological topics. For example, it was used in a prominent textbook of the day, Norman Maier and associates were applying the concept to ant behaviour; it seems that T. C. Schneirla had elected to use the term in 1932. It had proved useful, and by the end of the 20th century the word was in fairly common use, as can be seen from Google Ngram Viewer.
