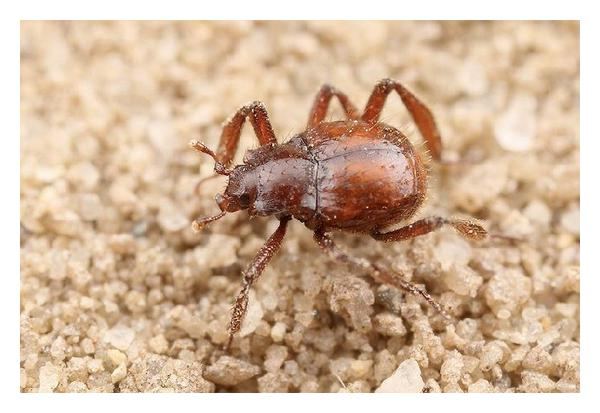
- Sternocoelis hispanus

Scientific classification
- Kingdom: Animalia
- Phylum: Arthropoda
- Class: Insecta
- Order: Coleoptera
- Suborder: Polyphaga
- Infraorder: Staphyliniformia
- Family: Histeridae
- Subfamily: Haeteriinae; Marseul, 1857

Tribes
- Haeteriini Marseul, 1857; Nymphistrini Tishechkin, 2007; Synoditulini Tishechkin, 2007

Diversity
- at least 110 genera

= Haeteriinae =

Subfamily of beetles

Haeteriinae is a subfamily of clown beetles in the family Histeridae. There are more than 110 genera and 330 described species in Haeteriinae.

== See also ==
- List of Haeteriinae genera
