= List of fauna of Rivers State =

This is a list of species of fauna (animals) that have been observed in Rivers State, Nigeria.

== Invertebrates ==
=== Arachnids ===
- Zebra spider, Salticus scenicus
- Jumping spider, Phidippus clarus

=== Crustaceans ===
- African rainbow crab, Cardisoma armatum
- Atlantic blue crab, Callinectes sapidus
- Atlantic ghost crab, Ocypode quadrata
- Blue land crab, Cardisoma guanhumi

=== Insects ===
==== Blattodea ====
- Australian cockroach, Periplaneta australasiae

==== Coleoptera ====
- Blue milkweed beetle, Chrysochus cobaltinus
- Chinese tiger beetle, Cicindela chinensis

==== Diptera ====
- Common housefly, Musca domestica
- Common malaria mosquito, Anopheles quadrimaculatus
- Common oblique syrphid, Allograpta obliqua
- Flower fly, Toxomerus geminatus

==== Hemiptera ====
- Creeping water bugs, Ilyocoris cimicoides

==== Hymenoptera ====
- Acrobat ant, Crematogaster ashmeadi
- African army ant, Dorylus molestus
- Little fire ant, Wasmannia auropunctata

==== Lepidoptera ====
- Cabbage butterfly, Pieris brassicae
- Cinnabar moth, Tyria jacobaeae
- Common fig-tree blue, Myrina silenus
- Eyed tiger moth, Hypercompe scribonia
- Gypsy moth, Lymantria dispar
- Monarch butterfly, Danaus plexippus
- Snout moth, Glyphodes canthusalis

==== Odonata ====
- Navy dropwing, Trithemis furva
- Orange-winged dropwing, Trithemis kirbyi
- Pacific spiketail, Cordulegaster dorsalis
- Tasmanian darner, Austroaeschna tasmanica

==== Orthoptera ====
- Fall field cricket, Gryllus pennsylvanicus

=== Molluscs ===
- Banana rasp snail, Archachatina marginata
- Giant African snail, Achatina fulica
- Giant tiger land snail, Achatina achatina

== Vertebrates ==
=== Amphibians ===
- Crowned bullfrog, Hoplobatrachus occipitalis
- Flat-backed toad, Amietophrynus maculatus
- Mascarene ridged frog, Ptychadena mascareniensis
- South African sharp-nosed frog, Ptychadena oxyrhynchus
- Square-marked toad, Amietophrynus regularis
- Western clawed frog, Xenopus tropicalis

=== Mammals ===
- African marsh rat, Dasymys incomtus
- African pygmy mouse, Mus minutoides
- Big-eared swamp rat, Malacomys longipes
- Black rat, Rattus rattus
- Brown rat, Rattus norvegicus
- Forest giant squirrel, Protoxerus stangeri
- Gambian pouched rat, Cricetomys gambianus
- Giant forest hog, Hylochoerus meinertzhageni
- Green bush squirrel, Paraxerus poensis
- House rat, Mus musculus
- Mona monkey, Cercopithecus mona
- Pygmy hippopotamus, Hexaprotodon liberiensis
- Red-bellied monkey, Cercopithecus erythrogaster
- Red colobus monkey, Procolobus preussi
- Sclater's monkey, Cercopithecus sclateri
- Striped ground squirrel, Xerus erythropus
- Typical striped grass mouse, Lemniscomys striatus
- Yellow-backed duiker, Cephalophus silvicultor

=== Reptiles ===
- African rock python, Python sebae
- Ball python, Python regius
- Black-necked spitting cobra, Naja nigricollis
- Blue-bellied black snake, Pseudechis guttatus
- Brown Rat Snake, Zaocys fuscus
- Calabar python, Calabaria reinhardtii
- Common house gecko, Hemidactylus frenatus
- Dwarf crocodile, Osteolaemus tetraspis
- Emerald snake, Hapsidophrys smaragdina
- Fire skink, Lepidothyris fernandi
- Forest cobra, Naja melanoleuca
- Forest hinge-back tortoise, Kinixys erosa
- Forest vine snake, Thelotornis kirtlandii
- Gaboon viper, Bitis gabonica
- Green bush viper, Atheris squamigera
- Jameson's mamba, Dendroaspis jamesoni
- Nile crocodile, Crocodylus niloticus
- Ornate monitor, Varanus ornatus
- Rainbow agama, Agama agama
- Senegal mabuya, Trachylepis affinis
- Slender-snouted crocodile, Mecistops cataphractus
- Speckle-lipped skink, Trachylepis maculilabris
- West African black turtle, Pelusios niger
- West African night adder, Causus maculatus
