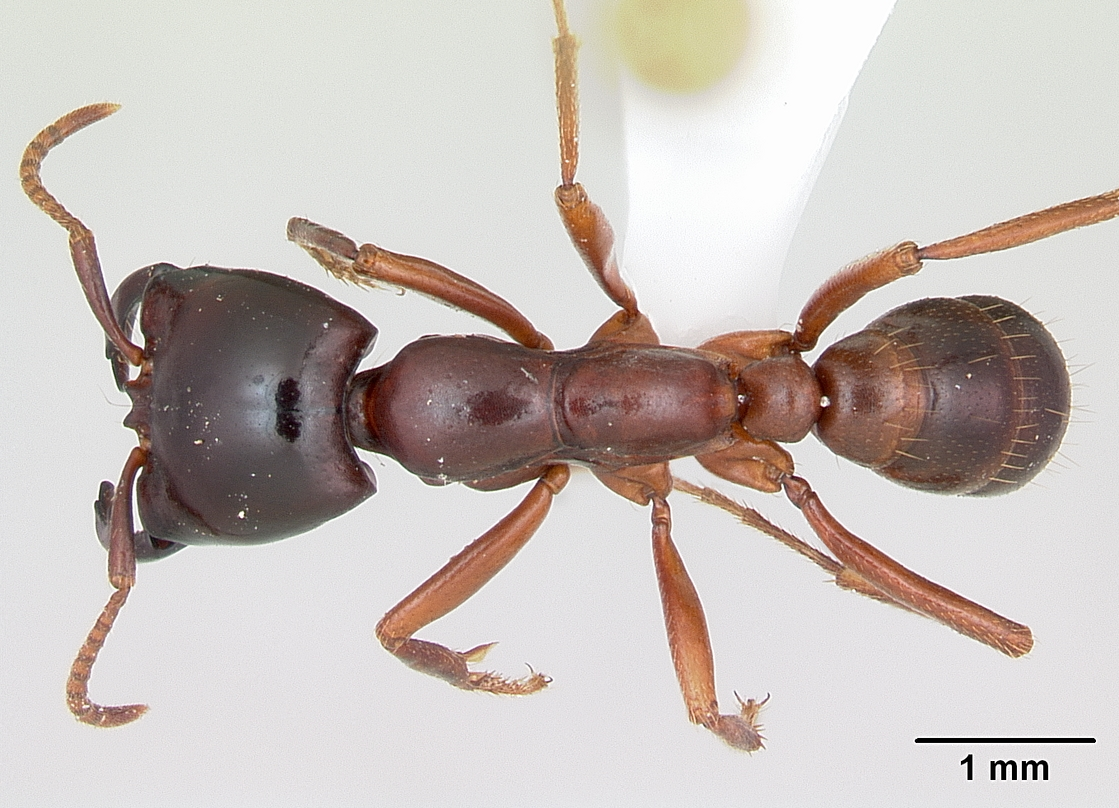
- D. gribodoi worker from the Ivory Coast

Scientific classification
- Kingdom: Animalia
- Phylum: Arthropoda
- Class: Insecta
- Order: Hymenoptera
- Family: Formicidae
- Genus: Dorylus
- Species: D. gribodoi

Binomial name
- Dorylus gribodoi Emery, 1892

Synonyms
- Dorylus gerstaeckeri Emery, 1895; Dorylus lamottei Bernard, 1953

= Dorylus gribodoi =

Species of ant

Dorylus gribodoi is a West African species of army ants in the genus Dorylus.

== Habitat and distribution ==
The species occurs in West Africa, from Guinea and Liberia to Cameroon. It is restricted to humid habitats such as rainforest and gallery forest in mixed savanna–forest landscapes and occurs at least up to 1600 m above sea level.

== Biology ==
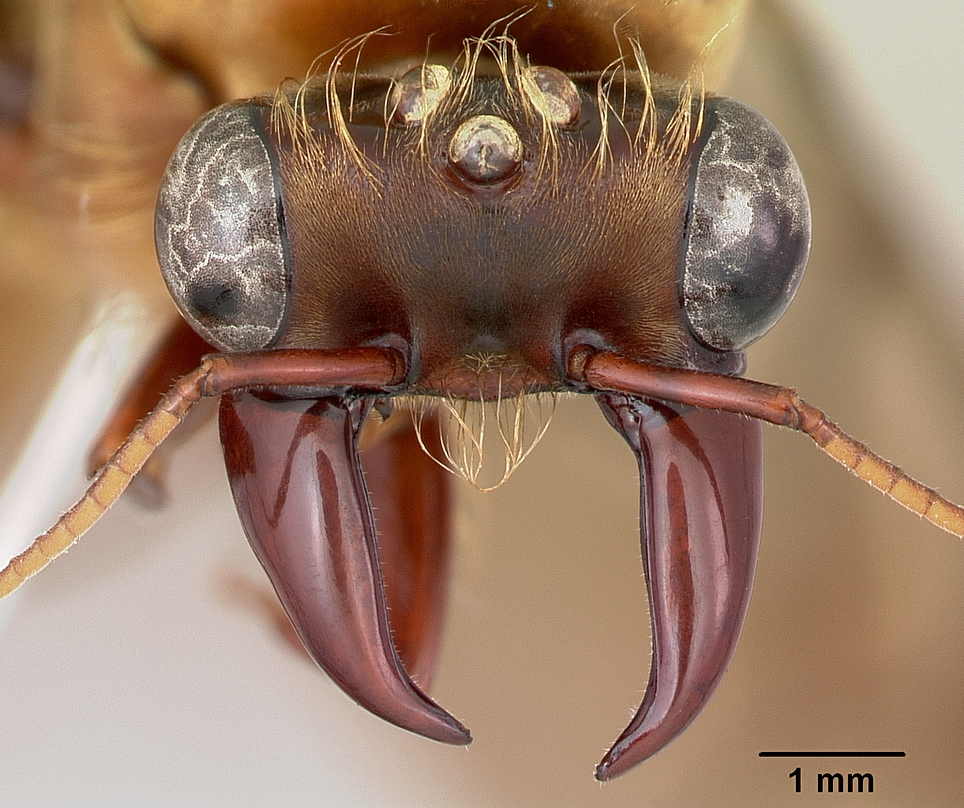
Frontal view of the head of a D. gribodoi male from Taï, Ivory Coast

Raids are conducted in the leaf-litter stratum. Workers retreat in tunnels when disturbed or exposed to sun. Limited observations indicate that the species seems to prey almost exclusively on earthworms, but this information has to be viewed with caution since variation in prey composition can be considerable in other Dorylus species. Chimpanzees are known to feed on D. gribodoi at two sites (Bossou in Guinea and Taï in Ivory Coast); they either use sticks to "dip" for ant workers at trails or nests or open nests and take brood and workers with their hands. Nests are much less conspicuous than those of driver ant species and extremely difficult to find (for humans; chimpanzees seem to do much better). D. emeryi is broadly sympatric with D. gribodoi and has nearly identical hunting behavior and habitat requirements, such that the two species may be easily confused in the field. The largest workers of D. emeryi are much larger.

== Description ==
The diagnostic features of the D. gribodoi male are its mandible shape (the anterior quarter notably flexed inward) and the nearly flat posterior head margin. In the original description Emery compared D. gribodoi with D. atratus and stated that D. atratus was darker than D. gribodoi and that its scape was longer than half the length of the funiculus. Both Smith (1859) in the original description and later Santschi (1914) mentioned that the posterior head margin of the D. atratus male was convex. While the colouration of D. gribodoi is variable, it is not uniformly black in any of the specimens examined by us and the head shape is nearly rectangular with a flat posterior margin. Workers of D. gribodoi are unique (and easily identifiable) among all Dorylus species in having a nearly round petiole in dorsal view and a distinct ridge on the posterior head margin that is laterally developed into tiny horns in larger specimens. D. gribodoi workers of the same size class can be separated from workers of the D. kohli / D. congolensis complex also by the posterior margin of the head being angular in lateral view and not smoothly rounded.

Larger D. emeryi workers can be separated from D. gribodoi workers of the same size class by the following features: posterior angles of head drawn out backwards and ventrally, petiole in dorsal view angled at widest point, petiole has several conspicuous erect setae on dorsal surface (which are lacking in D. gribodoi), largest workers have massive heads with width ≤ 3.92 mm. The unique petiole shape of D. gribodoi was recognized by Emery in his original description of D. gerstaeckeri (Emery 1895) and also by Bernard (1952) who described D. lamottei based on workers collected at Mount Nimba in Guinea but failed to realize that these specimens were in fact conspecific with Emery's D. gerstaeckeri. Bernard (1953) also identified males taken from the same location as D. gribodoi, but the association between these males and his D. lamottei workers necessarily remained unknown to him.
