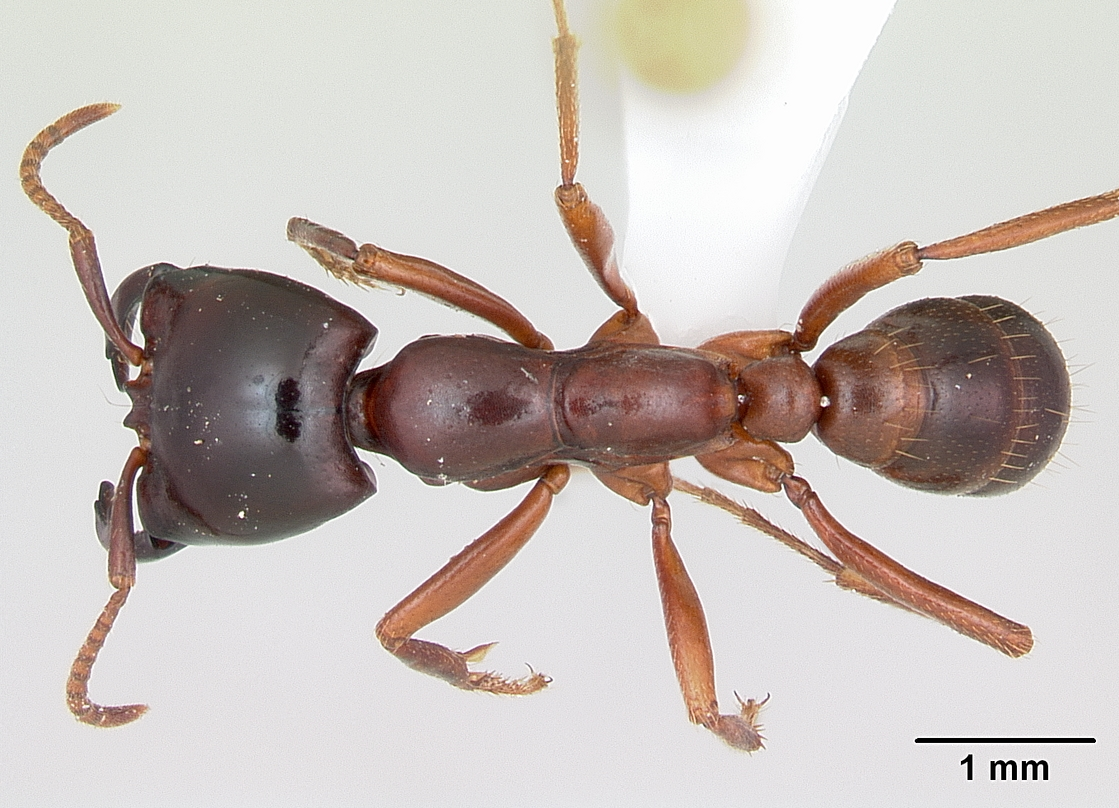
- Dorylus gribodoi

Scientific classification
- Kingdom: Animalia
- Phylum: Arthropoda
- Clade: Pancrustacea
- Class: Insecta
- Order: Hymenoptera
- Family: Formicidae
- Clade: Doryloformicia; Leach, 1815
- Subfamily: Dorylinae; Leach, 1815
- Genus: Dorylus; Fabricius, 1793

Type species
- Vespa helvola

Diversity
- 61 species

Synonyms
- Cosmaecetes Spinola, 1851; Shuckardia Emery, 1895; Sphecomyrmex Schulz, 1906; Sphegomyrmex Imhoff, 1852

= Dorylus =

Driver ants (genus of insects)

Dorylus, also known as driver ants, safari ants, or siafu, is a large genus of army ants found primarily in central and east Africa, although the range also extends to southern Africa and tropical Asia. The term siafu is a loanword from Swahili, and is one of numerous similar words from regional Bantu languages used by indigenous peoples to describe various species of these ants. Unlike the New World members of the former subfamily Ecitoninae (now Dorylinae), members of this genus form temporary subterranean bivouacs in underground cavities which they excavate and inhabit - either for a few days or up to three months. Also, unlike some New World army ants, driver ants are not specialized predators of other species of ant, instead being more generalistic with a diet consisting of a diversity of invertebrates. Their colonies are enormous compared to other ant species, and can contain over 20 million individuals. As with their American counterparts, workers exhibit caste polymorphism with the soldiers having particularly large heads that power their scissor-like mandibles. They are capable of stinging, but very rarely do so, relying instead on their powerful shearing jaws. A large part of their diet consists of earthworms. Driver ant queens are the largest living ants known, with the largest measuring between 40 - 63 millimeters (1.5 - 2.4 inches) in total body length depending on their physiological condition.

== Life cycle ==
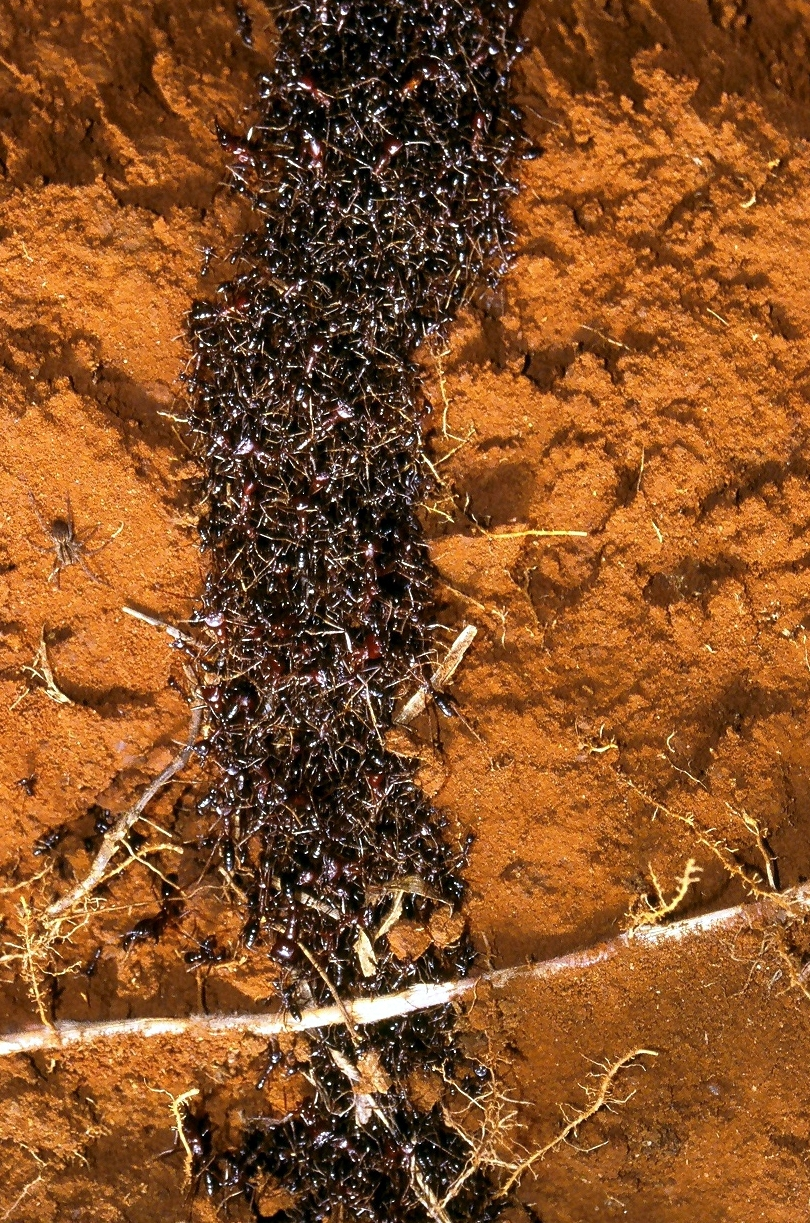
Some soldier safari ants make tunnels to provide a safe route for the workers.

Seasonally, when food supplies become short, they leave the hill and form marching columns of up to 20,000,000 ants, which constitute a considerable threat to humans, though they can be easily avoided as a column can only travel about 20 meters in an hour. It is for those unable to move, or when the columns pass through homes, that there is the greatest risk. The presence of a mobile column of safari ants is, conversely, beneficial to certain human communities, such as the Maasai. They perform a pest prevention service in farming communities, consuming the majority of other crop-pests, from insects to large rats. For example, driver ants prey on larvae of the African sugarcane borer, a pest moth in sub-Saharan Africa.

The characteristic long columns of ants will fiercely defend themselves against anything that attacks them. Columns are arranged with the smaller ants being flanked by the larger soldier ants. These instinctively take up positions as sentries, and set a perimeter corridor through which the smaller ants can run safely. Their bite is severely painful, each soldier leaving two puncture wounds when removed. Removal is difficult, however, as their jaws are extremely strong, and one can pull a soldier ant in two without it releasing its hold. Large numbers of ants can kill small or immobilized animals and strip them to husks. Such is the strength of the ant's jaws that, in East Africa, they are used as natural emergency sutures. Various East African indigenous tribal peoples (e.g. the Maasai moran), when suffering from a laceration in the wilds, will use the soldiers to stitch the wound by getting the ants to bite on both sides of the gash, then breaking off the body. This use of ants as makeshift surgical staples creates a seal that can hold for days at a time, and the procedure can be repeated, if necessary, allowing for natural healing. All Dorylus species are blind, and, like most varieties of ants, communicate primarily through pheromones.

In the mating season, alates (winged drones, queens of driver-ant species do not grow wings) are formed. The drones are larger than the soldiers and the queens are even larger. Driver ants do not perform a nuptial flight, but mate on the ground, and the queens go off to establish new colonies. As with most ants, workers and soldiers are sterile females and, so, do not reproduce.

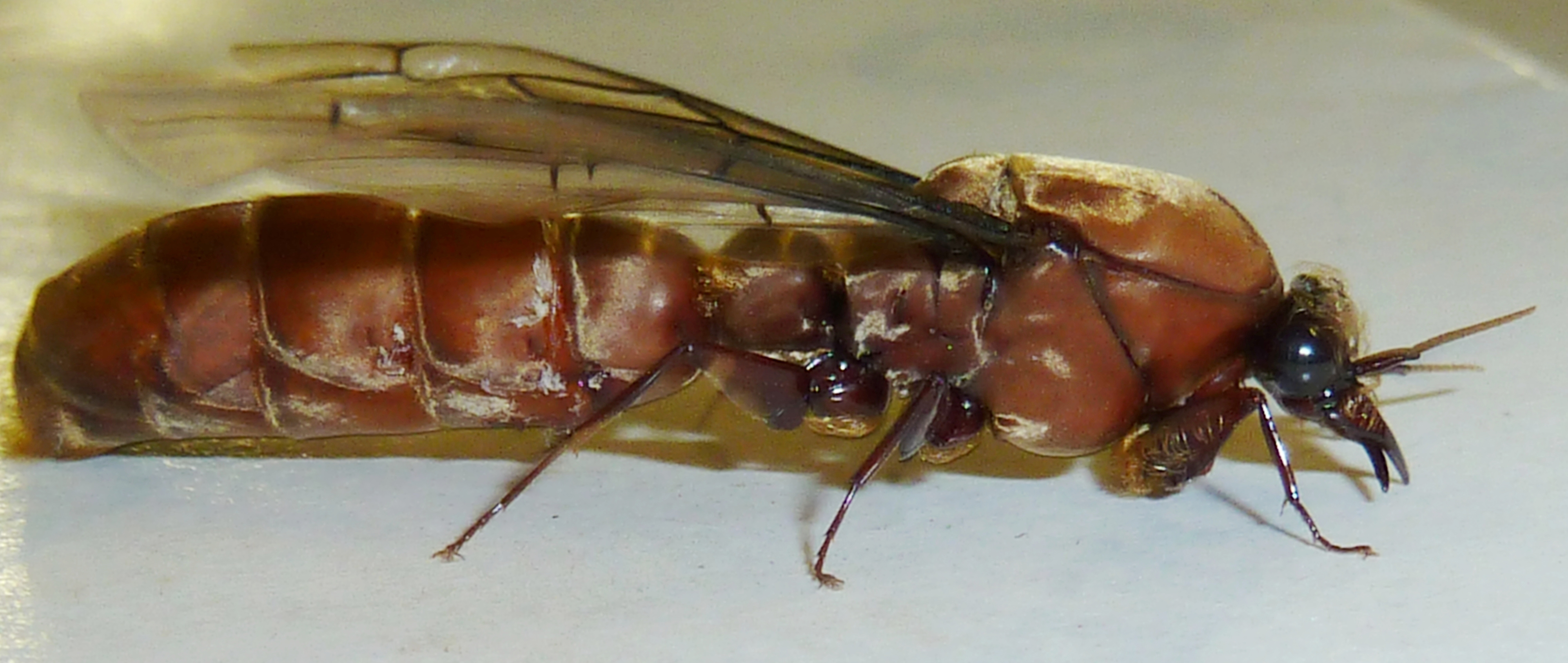
A male driver ant

Male driver ants, sometimes known as "sausage flies" (a term also applied to males of New World dorylines) due to their bloated, sausage-like abdomens, are among the largest ant morphs and were originally believed to be members of a different species. Males leave the colony soon after hatching but are drawn to the scent trail left by a column of siafu once they reach sexual maturity. When a colony of driver ants encounters a male, they tear his wings off and carry him back to the nest to be mated with a recently hatched queen. As in the majority of ant species, males die shortly afterward. Driver ant queens exhibit polyandry; young queens from some species with large colony sizes must mate with 10–20 males before they have gathered enough sperm for their reproductive lives. Once the queen is ready, roughly half of the workers in the colony will leave with her to found a new colony. Driver ant queens are the largest ants on Earth and have the greatest egg-laying capacity among insects, laying several million eggs each month.

Several species in this genus carry out raids on termitaria, paralyzing or killing termites and carting them back to the nest.

Colonies of driver-ant species have only one queen. When she dies, the surviving workers may try to join another colony, but in other cases, when two colonies of the same driver-ant species meet, they usually change the marching directions to avoid conflicts.

== Species ==
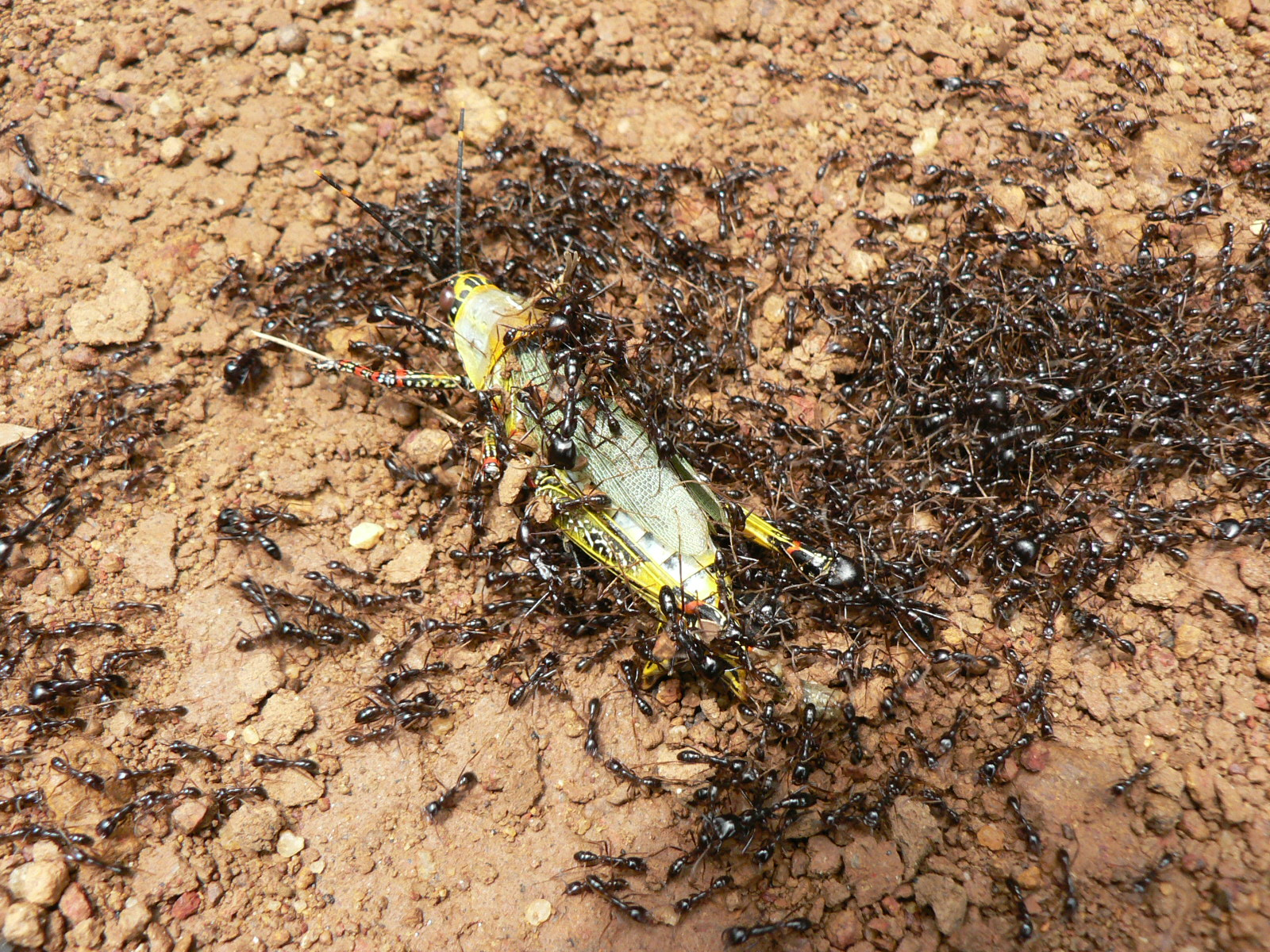
Dorylus sp. in Cameroon, consuming a grasshopper

Dorylus sp. in Zambia, consuming mayonnaise

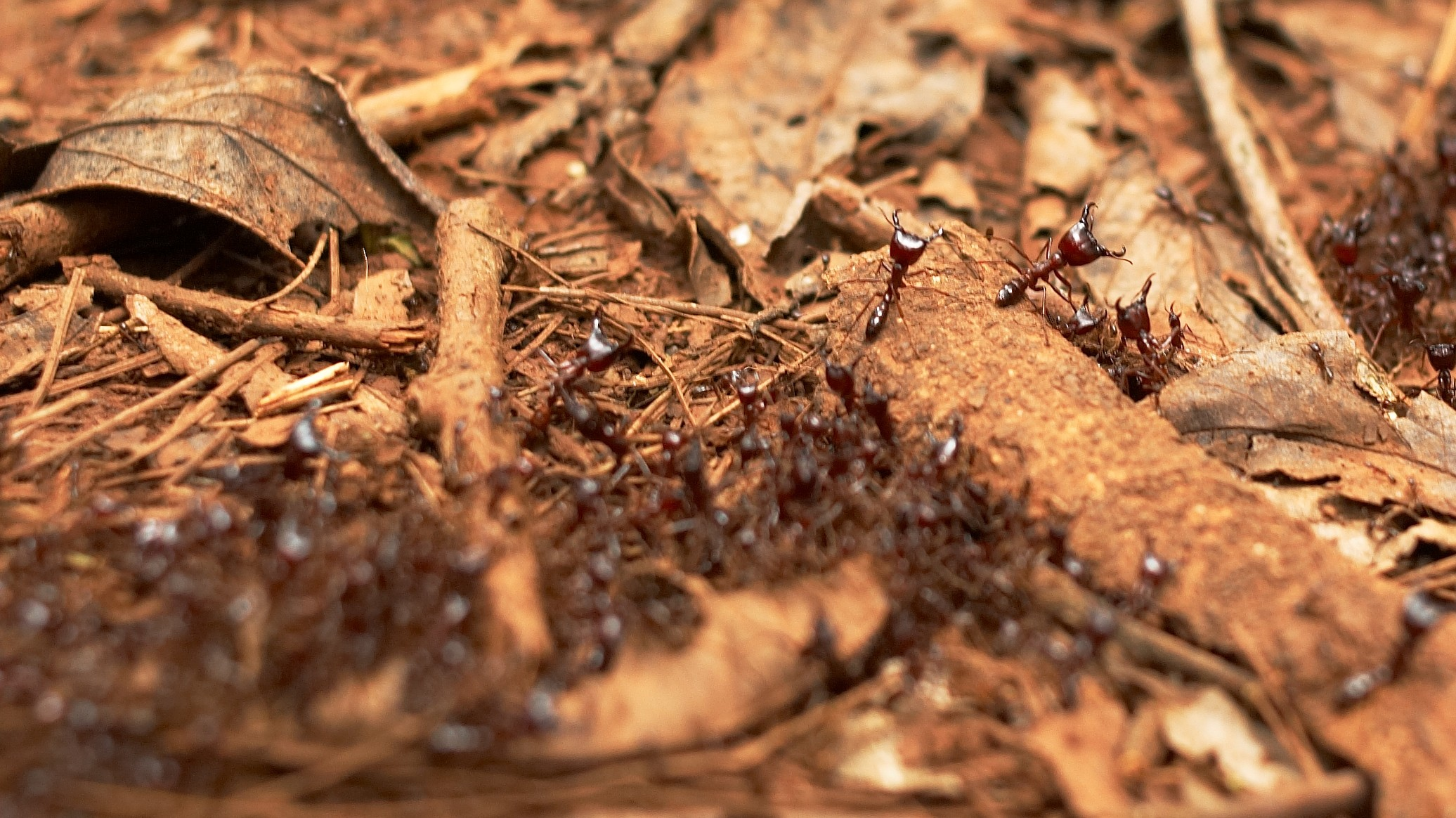
A column of safari ants in Kakamega Forest, Kenya, guarded by soldiers

- D. acutus Santschi, 1937
- D. aethiopicus Emery, 1895
- D. affinis Shuckard, 1840
- D. agressor Santschi, 1923
- D. alluaudi Santschi, 1914
- D. atratus Smith, 1859
- D. atriceps Shuckard, 1840
- D. attenuatus Shuckard, 1840
- D. bequaerti Forel, 1913
- D. bishyiganus (Boven, 1972)
- D. braunsi Emery, 1895
- D. brevipennis Emery, 1895
- D. brevis Santschi, 1919
- D. buyssoni Santschi, 1910
- D. congolensis Santschi, 1910
- D. conradti Emery, 1895
- D. depilis Emery, 1895
- D. diadema Gerstaecker, 1859
- D. distinctus Santschi, 1910
- D. ductor Santschi, 1939
- D. emeryi Mayr, 1896
- D. erraticus (Smith, 1865)
- D. faurei Arnold, 1946
- D. fimbriatus (Shuckard, 1840)
- D. fulvus (Westwood, 1839)
- D. funereus Emery, 1895
- D. furcatus (Gerstaecker, 1872)
- D. fuscipennis (Emery, 1892)
- D. gaudens Santschi, 1919
- D. ghanensis Boven, 1975
- D. gribodoi Emery, 1892 – includes D. gerstaeckeri Emery, 1895
- D. helvolus (Linnaeus, 1764)
- D. katanensis Stitz, 1911
- D. kohli Wasmann, 1904
- D. labiatus Shuckard, 1840
- D. laevigatus (Smith, 1857)
- Dorylus lamottei (= D. gribodoi) Bernard, 1953
- D. leo Santschi, 1919
- D. mandibularis Mayr, 1896
- D. mayri Santschi, 1912
- D. moestus Emery, 1895
- D. molestus Wheeler, 1922
- D. montanus Santschi, 1910
- D. niarembensis (Boven, 1972)
- D. nigricans Illiger, 1802
- D. ocellatus (Stitz, 1910)
- D. orientalis Westwood, 1835
- D. politus Emery, 1901
- D. rufescens Santschi, 1915
- D. savagei Emery, 1895
- D. schoutedeni Santschi, 1923
- D. spininodis Emery, 1901
- D. stadelmanni Emery, 1895
- D. stanleyi Forel, 1909
- D. staudingeri Emery, 1895
- D. striatidens Santschi, 1910
- D. termitarius Wasmann, 1911
- D. titan Santschi, 1923
- D. vishnui Wheeler, 1913
- D. westwoodii (Shuckard, 1840)
- D. wilverthi Emery, 1899

== See also ==
- Army ant
