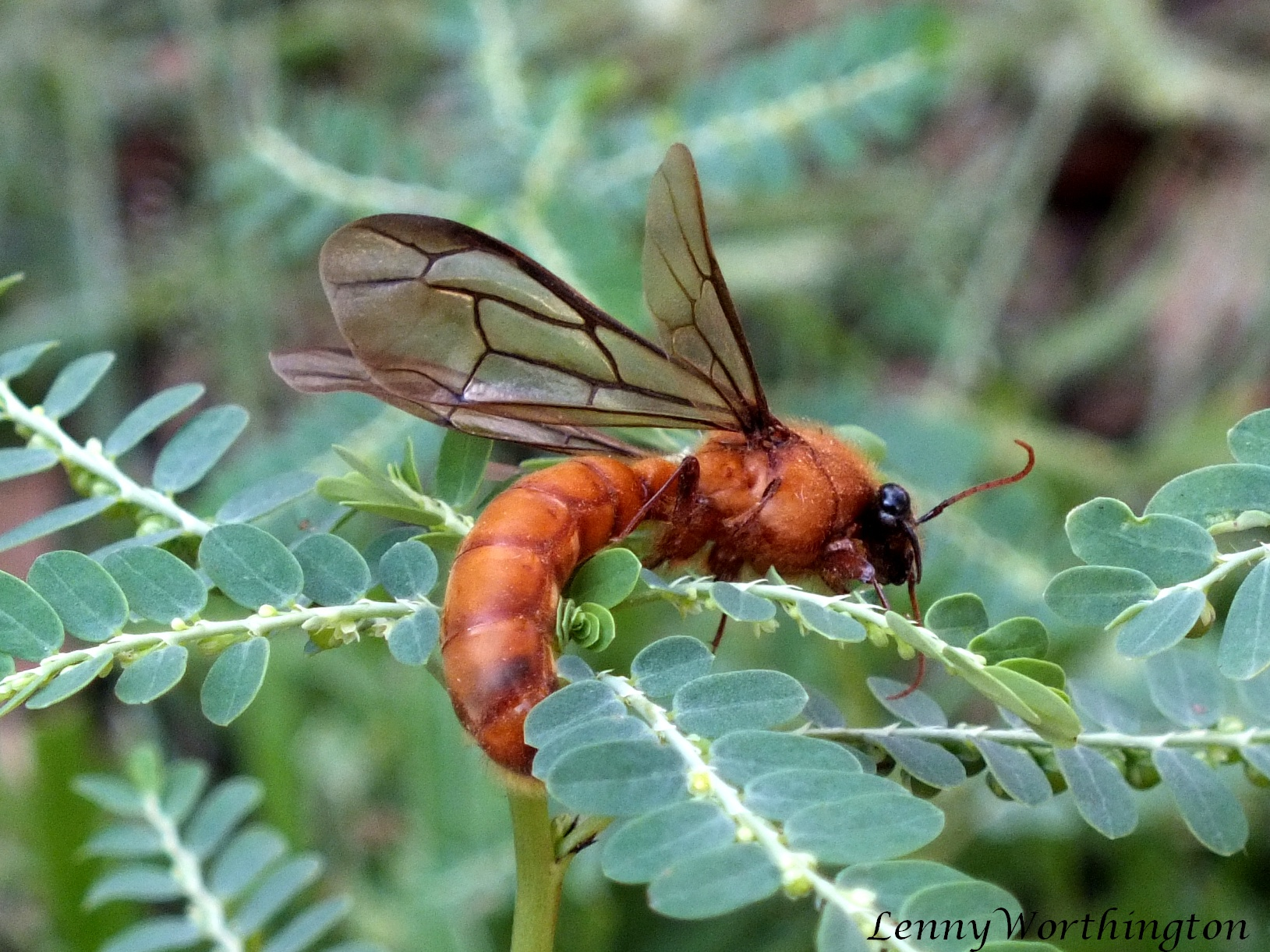

Scientific classification
- Domain: Eukaryota
- Kingdom: Animalia
- Phylum: Arthropoda
- Class: Insecta
- Order: Hymenoptera
- Family: Formicidae
- Genus: Dorylus
- Species: D. laevigatus

Binomial name
- Dorylus laevigatus (Smith, 1857)

= Dorylus laevigatus =

Species of ant

Dorylus laevigatus is a member of the army ant genus Dorylus, or Old World army ants. More specifically known as "driver ants", the genus Dorylus is abundant throughout Africa and stretches into tropical Asia, where D. laevigatus is primarily found. They are a eusocial colony-forming species, which live primarily underground, rarely venturing to the surface for any reason. D. laevigatus colonies are small for army ants, estimated averages falling between 30,000 and 1,000,000 individuals.

== Morphology ==
Dorylus laevigatus shares the typical morphological characteristics common of all ants, including three body segments known as tagmata, a slim waist joining the second and third tagmata called the petiole, and mandibulate mouth parts located on the head for holding and breaking down food. Characteristic of their genus, D. laevigatus is blind, possessing no eyes and communicating entirely through pheromones. As a holometabolous insect, D. laevigatus larvae differ significantly from the mature adults, closely resembling white maggots.

D. laevigatus has a high degree of caste polymorphism, meaning that individuals within the species have radically different morphological characteristics, depending on which role they play in the colony. Males have only one caste, the drone, which is a reproductive caste and is not present in the colony. Males average 2.5 centimetres (0.98 in) in length, possess a pair of wings, and are covered in short hairs. They live apart from the colonies and resemble the night wasp Provespa nocturna, which possibly deters predators afraid of receiving a painful sting. Females are divided up into three castes; large workers, small workers, and queens. Large workers are colloquially known as soldiers and do most of the colony defense and incapacitation of large prey. The soldier caste is roughly a centimeter in length, with an enlarged head to house powerful serrated mandibles. The smallest workers are three times smaller than the soldiers, only reaching an average length of 2.5mm. They are lighter colored than their larger relatives and lack the large protruding jaws. The queen is the largest female caste and is the sole fertile female in the colony. Her abdomen is enlarged, and she has an average length of just under three centimeters. The last leg segments (tarsi) of queens are mutilated and greatly reduced, which hinders their ability to locomote without assistance from workers. Assessing characteristic larvae size between castes is very difficult, as larvae size is influenced by both developmental stage and their caste. Differentiating between caste and developmental stage of an unpupated larva is largely impossible. D. laevigatus is one of only five species of genus Dorylus for which all castes are known.

== Ecology ==
D. laevigatus is found on both the main continent of Asia and the Indonesian archipelago. It is highly abundant within West Malaysia and in Borneo. Within these areas, D. laevigatus can inhabit a fair range of habitats, due to the largely homeostatic conditions present below ground. Each nest occupies its own territory within the ants' forest habitats Within its foraging area, D. laevigatus is almost omnipresent, with foraging ants scattered across the habitat. This deviates from the traditional hyper-localized and temporary presence of previously studied army ants in their foraging areas. Like most members of genus Dorylus, D. laevigatus constructs subterranean nests. The nests leave no visible indications of their location when viewed from above ground; researchers only managed to locate them by excavation of foraging tunnels. D. laevigatus colonies are fairly small for army ant colonies, ranging from 30,000 to 1,000,000 individuals. Because the colonies prefer long-term food exploitation and stable column foraging systems to massive raids, there is little pressure for the colonies to expand and support the massive numbers of individuals common in surface-hunting driver and army ants. Additionally, the gigantic amounts of foraging ants typical of other Dorylus species would be of little value in the small foraging tunnels of D. laevigatus. These colonies are also low in non-ant guest species compared to terrestrial driver ant species.

When constructing their colony, D. laevigatus will vary the chambers based on environmental conditions; altering between a large single chamber and several linked small chambers. Large chambers are preferred in dry conditions, but chronic wet weather prompts the ants to reform their nests into smaller, more numerous collections of chambers which are less vulnerable to flooding. Within these chambers, the ants form the true structures of their colonies: living chambers of ants linked together suspended within the cavity called bivouacs. The workers link together in an orderly fashion via legs and mandibles to form a living sac to protect the eggs, larvae, and queen. When the colony decides that several chambers better suits the environment, the bivouac is broken up into however many clusters are required to fit the new chambers.

The colony occupies the nest for a few weeks ranging to a few months before the local supply of food inevitably wanes. When this occurs, the colony will evacuate the nest and spend roughly 20–40 hours migrating to a new suitable location. Even these emigrations occur entirely below ground, with workers shifting soil around in the same strata so as to leave no surface indication of subterranean events.

D. laevigatus is not without its own predators, even falling prey to other colonies of ants within its habitat. Each of the five most common ant species in a Malaysian study of D. laevigatus managed to avoid, kill, or prey on the smaller D. laevigatus workers. Only when confronted with ants which occupy the same swarming army niche do they behave aggressively, specifically when dealing with D. vishnui, a similar species of driver ant with which it shares habitat. Two colonies of D. laevigatus attacking each other has not been observed.

== Behavior ==
=== Diet and hunting ===
D. laevigatus is an omnivorous organism. It preys on other arthropods, worms, and any other animal small enough to be overrun. When given the opportunity, it will also eat a wide range of foods, such as oil, tuna, cookies, peanut butter, boiled rice, and bananas. Despite this generalized diet, D. laevigatus has never been recorded damaging crops.

Arthropod prey is usually consumed on the spot or cut up and taken back to the nest, but the ants will always cover the dead organism with soil before taking either action. Observing these ants during foraging is exceedingly difficult due to the subterranean nature of their hunting. The ants forage using stable tunnels located below ground, giving them full access to their foraging territory. These non-changing columns and tunnel systems originate as a large “trunk”tunnel and then branch out to further cover the entire foraging area. They are unique to the subterranean foraging D. laevigatus; other species of driver ant and army ant prefer a constantly changing system of raids with columns alternating directions.

These surface foraging ants also prefer to mix castes in their raids, with large and small workers moving together to search for prey. D. laevigatus foraging behavior uniquely abandons the mixed-worker raid model. The colony uses caste-specific raids to forage for food, with the smallest workers forming columns and searching along natural cracks and tunnels of the soil for arthropods and other food sources. When large or dangerous food is found, the workers widen the natural fissures and gaps in the soil and then recruit larger ants from the stable tunnels to help process or subdue it. When large numbers of ants are recruited to prey sites, some workers do not stop at the food, but instead continue on briefly in a new direction. This is known as “recruitment overrun”and if food is discovered during these short additional excursions, more workers will be recruited further into the area. Recruitment overrun is one of the few raiding behaviors that D. laevigatus shares with traditionally studied army and driver ants. Furthermore, on rare occasions, D. laevigatus will venture above ground to forage in large swarm raids. These raids are another shared behavior with traditionally studied driver ants, but they have only been observed to occur during the night. D. laevigatus' generalized diet and slow exploitation of large food sources such as termite mounds means slower depletion of available food. Local arthropod densities remain stable even in the presence of a foraging colony of the ants, in sharp contrast to the decimation a colony of typical army ants imposes on local arthropods.2 Above ground foraging driver and army ants have been observed collecting upwards of 90,000 insects per day in their raids, a number which Even juvenile soil-dwellers with less motile ability did not decrease notably in abundance inside D. laevigatus foraging areas.

=== Reproduction ===
Like most eusocial organisms, reproduction in D. laevigatus is handled by the reproductive caste, made up of the sole fertile queen and her consort males. Because the queens are largely immobile, they cannot participate in a nuptial flight in order to found new colonies. Like all other driver and army ants, D. laevigatus colonies reproduce via colony fission. Males leave the nest at an early age and seek one out again upon reaching maturity. Males of typical surface-forgaging driver ants locate the nests via chemical smells. The mechanism by which the subterranean D. laevigatus male finds the underground nests of his species is still unknown. When he reaches the nest, his wings are torn off and he is carried to a newly grown virgin queen who is bred when the colony reaches a threshold size. The queen mates with the male and the colony then splits, with many workers carrying the newly fertile queen off to establish a new colony. There is some evidence that D. laevigatus will undergo multiple matings under lab conditions, but this has never been tested in the wild.

The traditional view of driver ant reproduction involved the colony breeding in a cycle of emigration and reproduction phases. During the emigration phase, the colony continuously travels throughout its territory, consuming any prey it encounters. Once the ants have arrived in an area with enough prey density, the colony constructs a semi-permanent nest and the queen lays a new generation of eggs to be raised until local resources deplete and the cycle continues. However, D. laevigatus' subterranean habitat and comparatively low rate of resource depletion gives them an irregular emigration schedule. In addition, the queen's general inability to easily move without assistance hinders colony emigration attempts. Consequently, they do not breed in cycles like many other army ants. Instead, there is a new larval generation being born at any given time, which carried by workers in the event of a necessary nest migration.

=== Behavior ===
When handled or disturbed, D. laevigatus males will move their abdomen in a sudden, jerking thrust towards whatever is threatening them. This mimics the stinging behavior of the night wasp which they closely resemble, serving as an effective deterrent towards would-be predators.

Palm oil baits placed into the ground quickly and reliably recruit large numbers of D. laevigatus, implying a far more permanent foraging presence in a given area than with above-ground driver ants, which are notoriously difficult to predictably bait.

D. laevigatus has been observed to form fan-shaped above ground raids up to 3.5 meters wide during the late evening and night. Workers participating in these raids were observed occasionally tunneling back down into the earth at random spots. None of these above-ground raids extended upwards into vegetation. During these raids, workers prefer to travel under leaf litter and debris as much as possible and immediately relocate kills underground, which makes observing them quite difficult.
