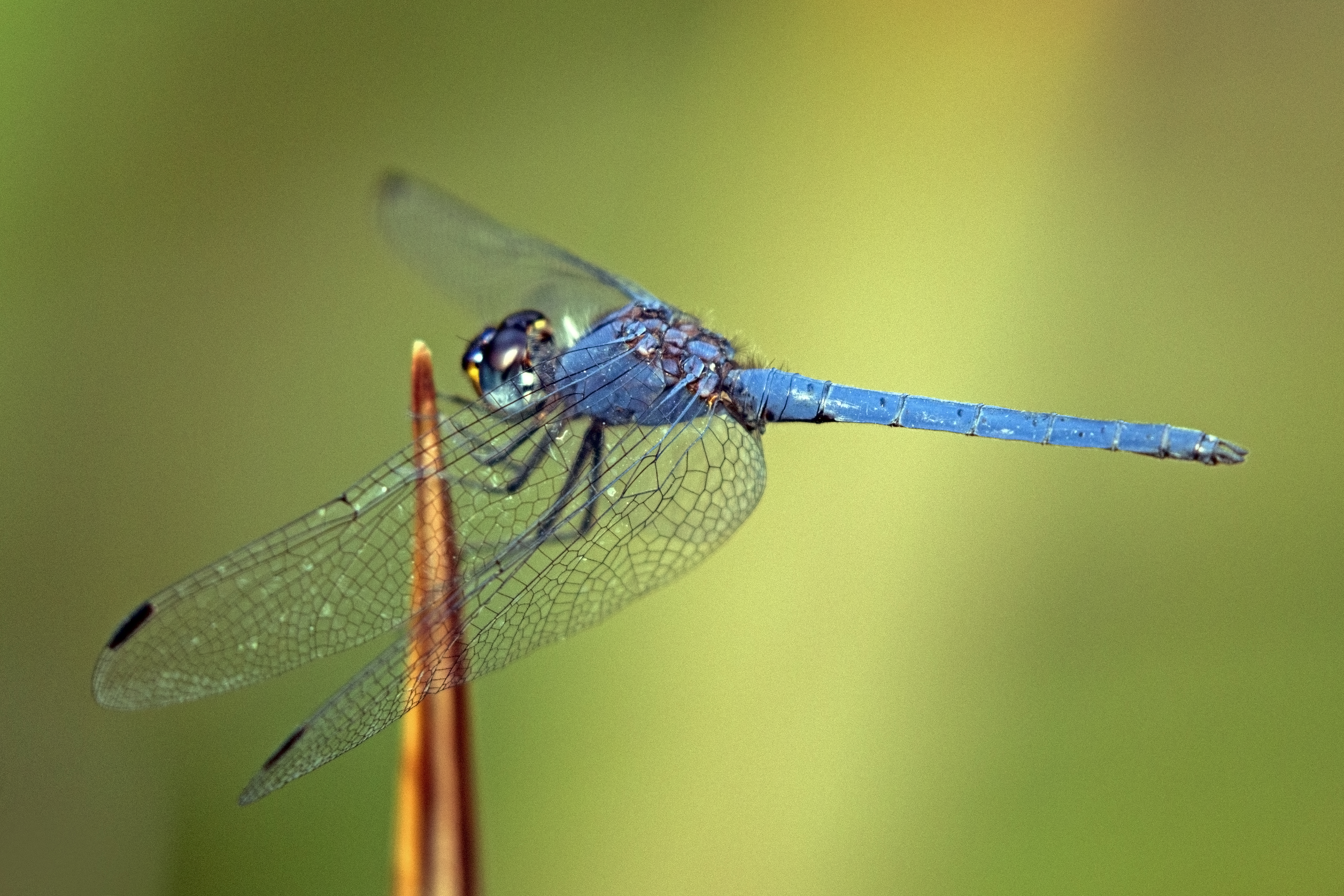
- male, Kakamega Forest, Kenya
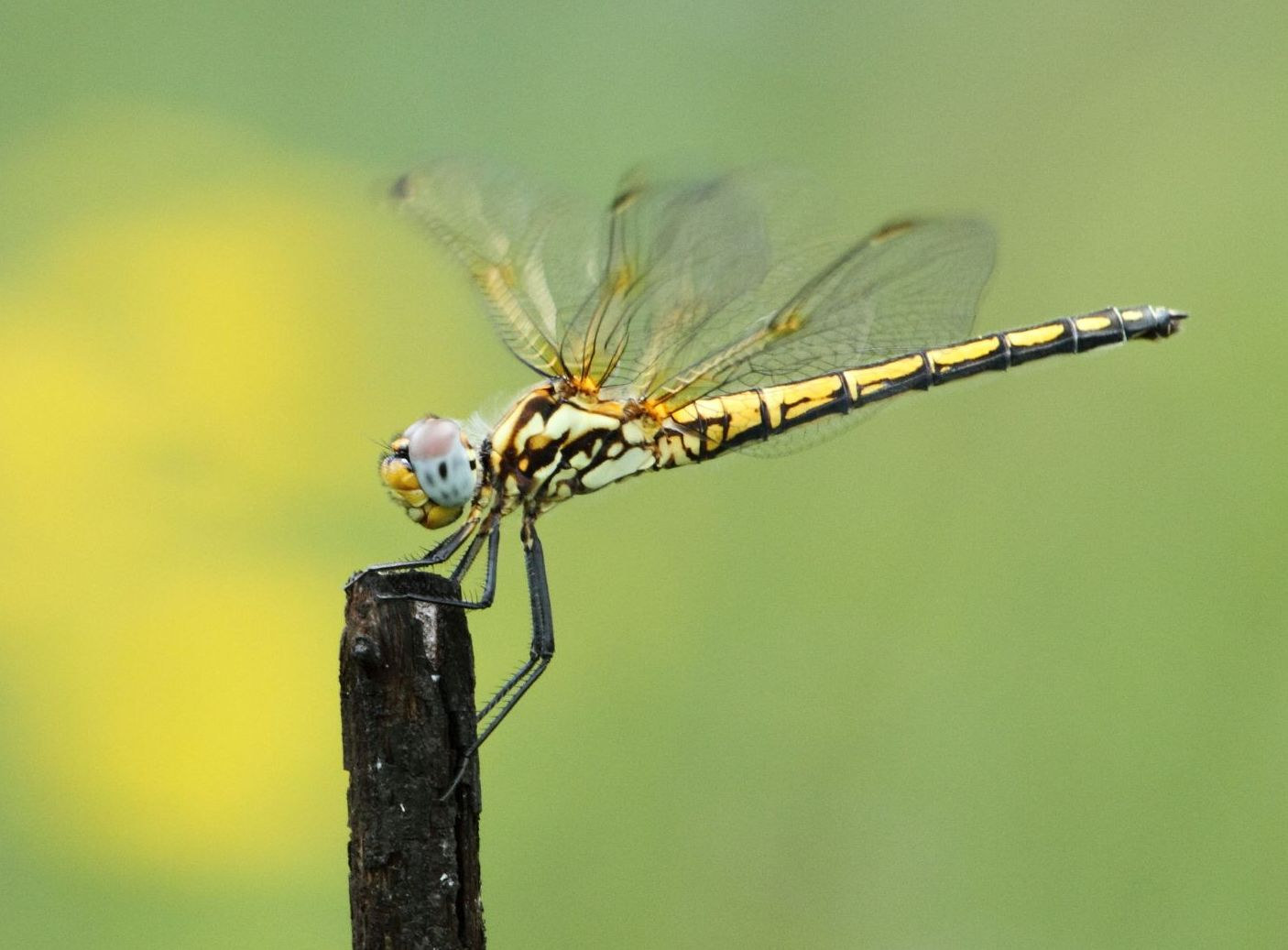
- Female

Conservation status
- Least Concern (IUCN 3.1)

Scientific classification
- Kingdom: Animalia
- Phylum: Arthropoda
- Class: Insecta
- Order: Odonata
- Infraorder: Anisoptera
- Family: Libellulidae
- Genus: Trithemis
- Species: T. furva

Binomial name
- Trithemis furva Karsch, 1899

= Trithemis furva =

Species of dragonfly

Trithemis furva, the Navy dropwing, is a species of dragonfly in the family Libellulidae. It is found in Angola, Cameroon, Chad, Ivory Coast, Equatorial Guinea, Ethiopia, Guinea, Kenya, Liberia, Madagascar, Malawi, Mozambique, Namibia, Nigeria, Sierra Leone, Somalia, South Africa, Sudan, Tanzania, Uganda, Zambia, Zimbabwe, and possibly Burundi. Its natural habitats are subtropical or tropical moist lowland forests, dry savanna, moist savanna, subtropical or tropical dry shrubland, subtropical or tropical moist shrubland, rivers, freshwater marshes, and intermittent freshwater marshes.

== Identification ==
In much of its range, mature males of T. furva are easily confused with those of the similar T. dorsalis. The key difference between the species is the shape of the hamule of the secondary genitalia. Also, in most specimens of T. furva, the outermost antenodal cross-veins do not cross the subcostal vein to join the radial vein, whereas in T. dorsalis they do.

== Gallery ==
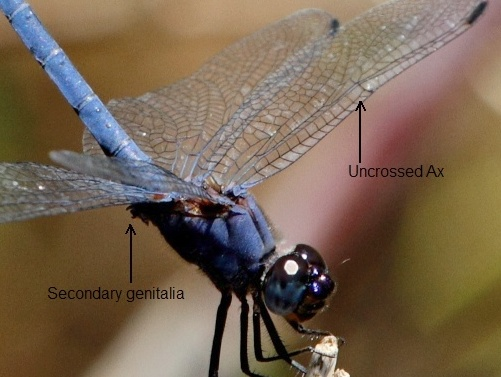
Mature male showing the secondary genitalia and the position of the outermost antenodal cross-vein (Ax)

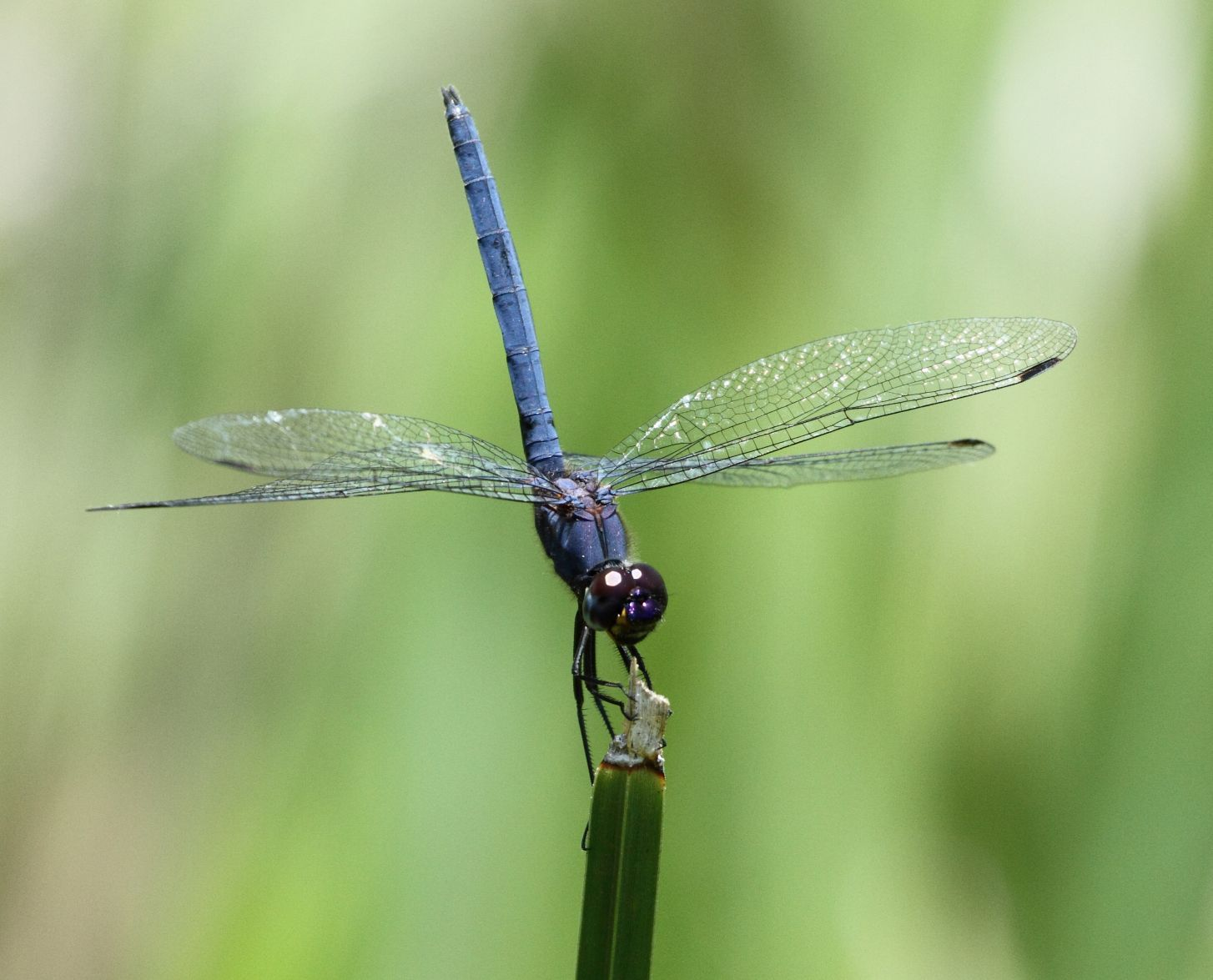
Mature male

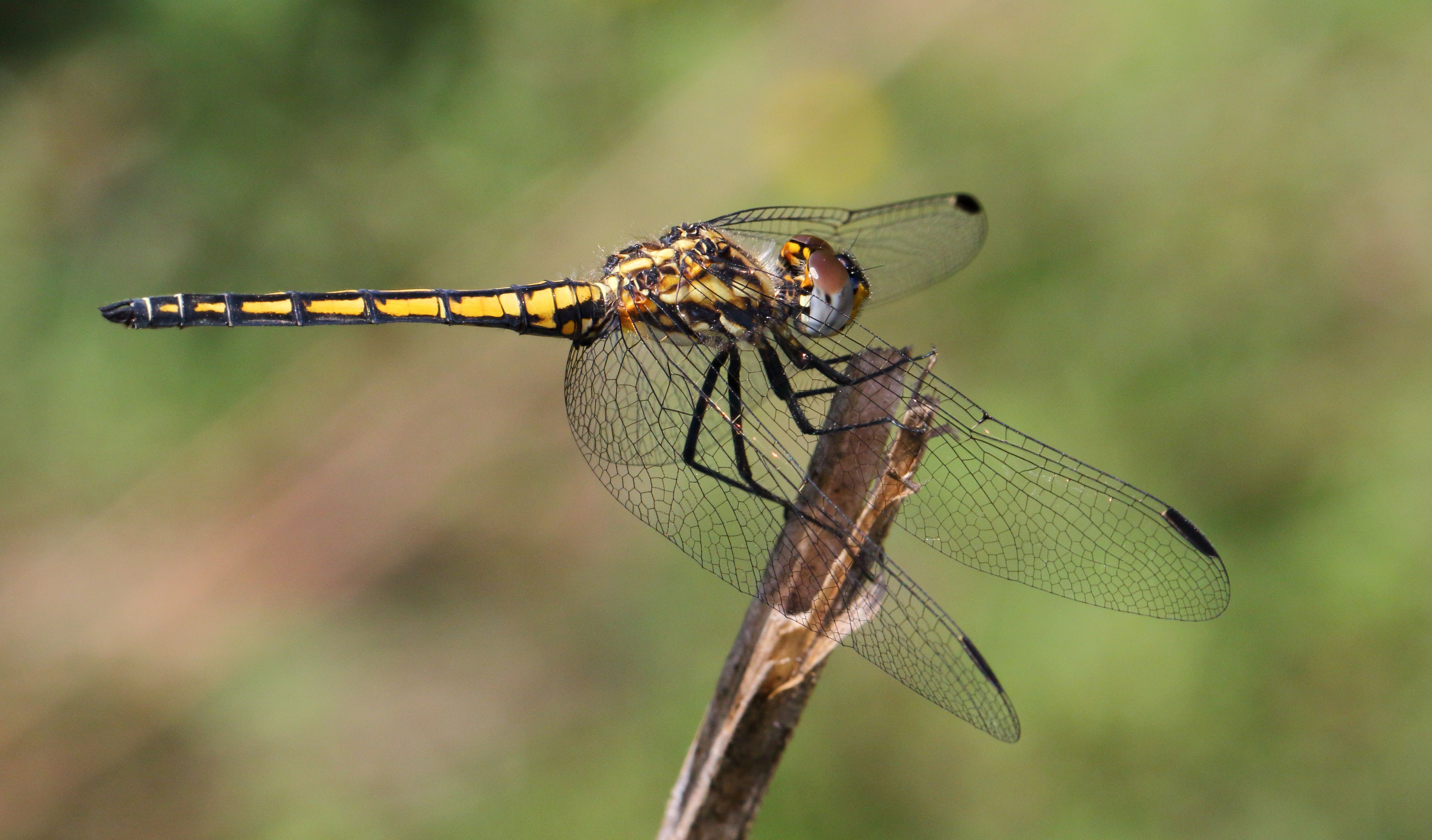
Immature male

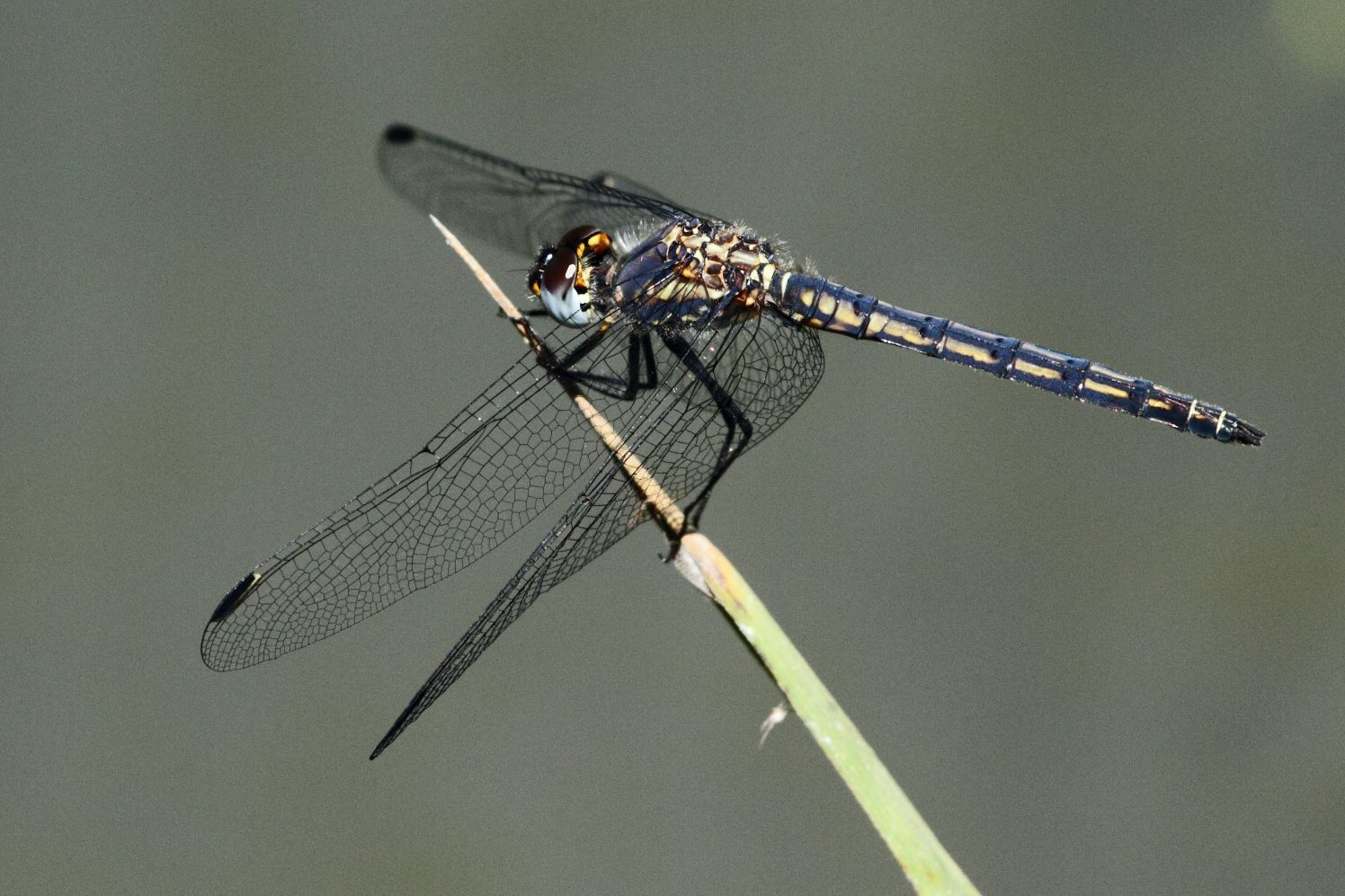
Immature male

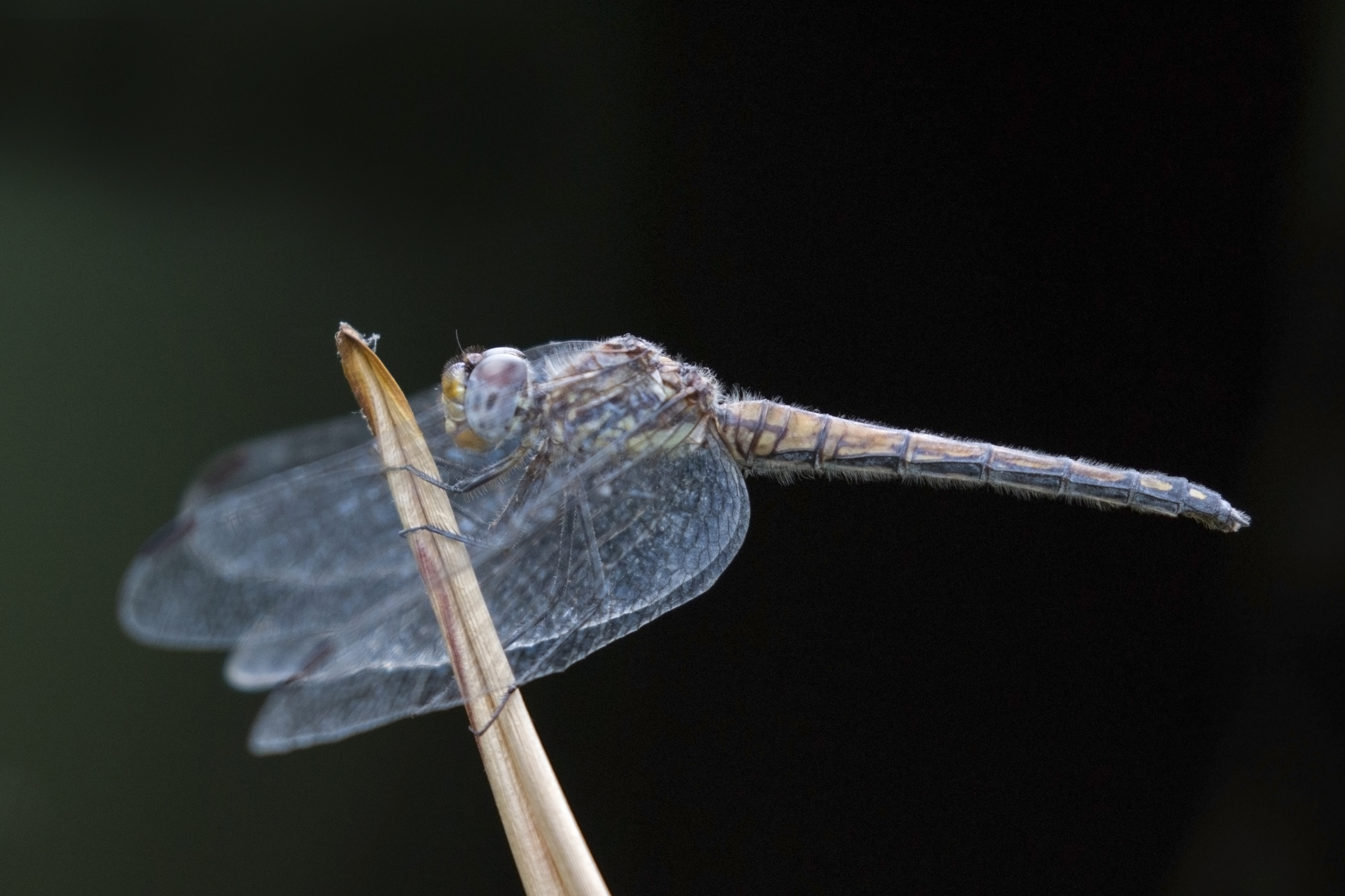
mature female
