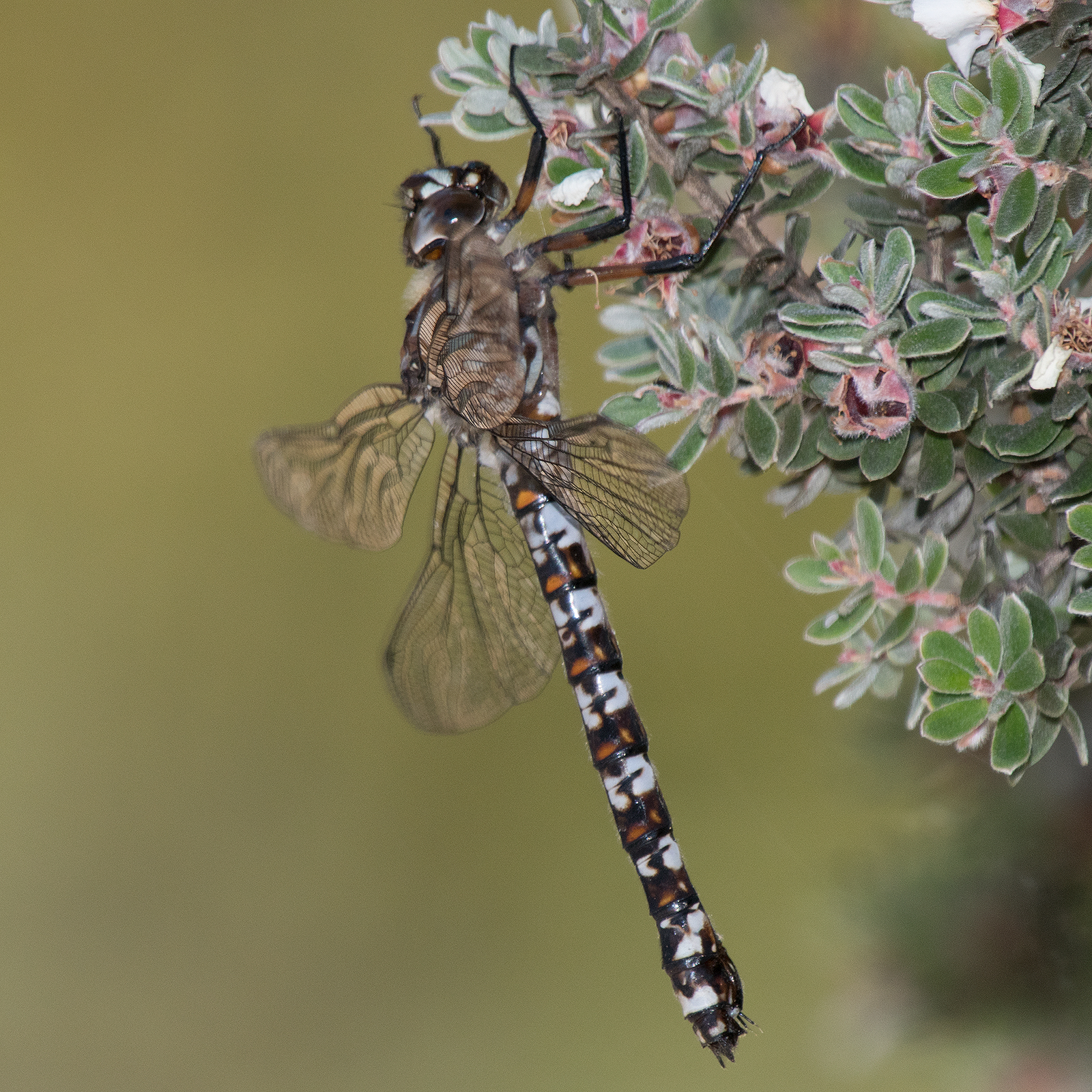
- Female
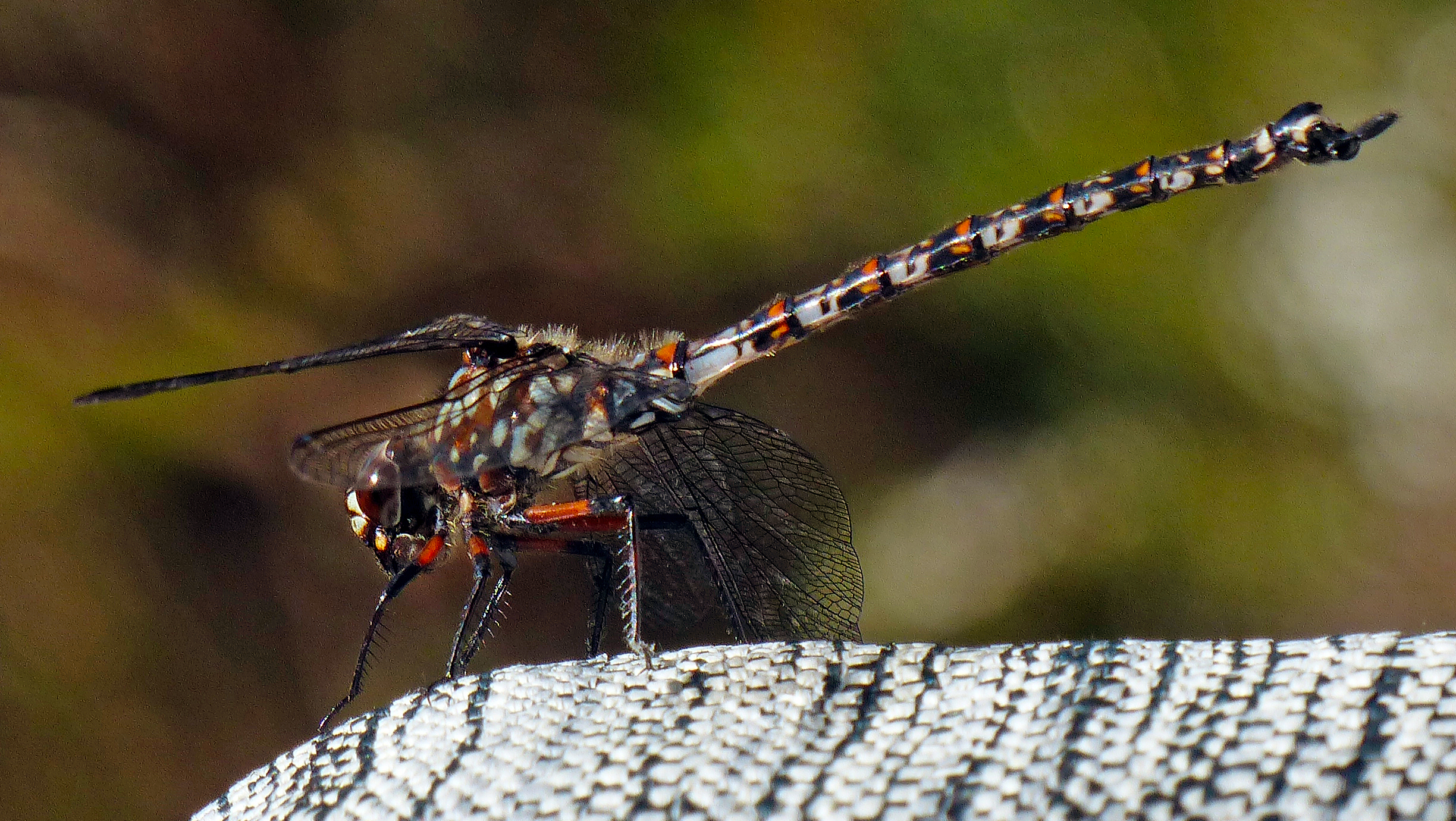
- Male

Conservation status
- Least Concern (IUCN 3.1)

Scientific classification
- Kingdom: Animalia
- Phylum: Arthropoda
- Clade: Pancrustacea
- Class: Insecta
- Order: Odonata
- Suborder: Anisoptera
- Family: Aeshnidae
- Genus: Austroaeschna
- Species: A. hardyi

Binomial name
- Austroaeschna hardyi Tillyard, 1917

= Austroaeschna hardyi =

Lesser Tasmanian darner

Species of dragonfly

Austroaeschna hardyi is a species of large dragonfly in the family Aeshnidae, known as the lesser Tasmanian darner. It inhabits streams and rivers in Western Tasmania, Australia.

Austroaeschna hardyi is a dark dragonfly with dull markings. It appears similar to the Tasmanian darner, Austroaeschna tasmanica.

== Etymology ==
The genus name Austroaeschna combines the prefix austro- (from Latin auster, meaning “south wind”, hence “southern”) with Aeshna, a genus of dragonflies.

In 1917, Robin Tillyard named this species hardyi, likely an eponym honouring G. H. Hardy (1882-1966), Assistant Curator of the Tasmanian Museum, Hobart, from 1913 to 1917.

== Gallery ==
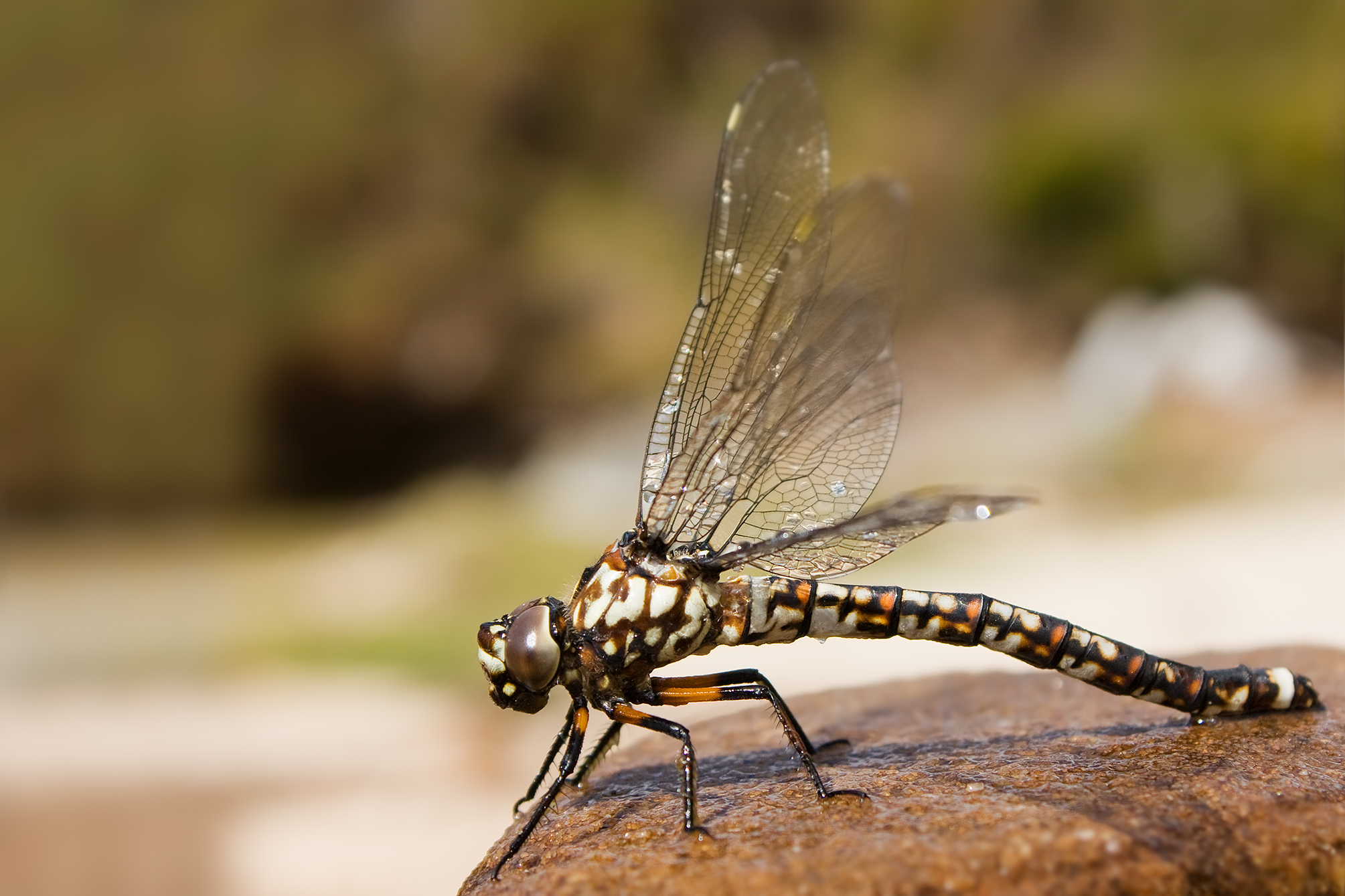
Female

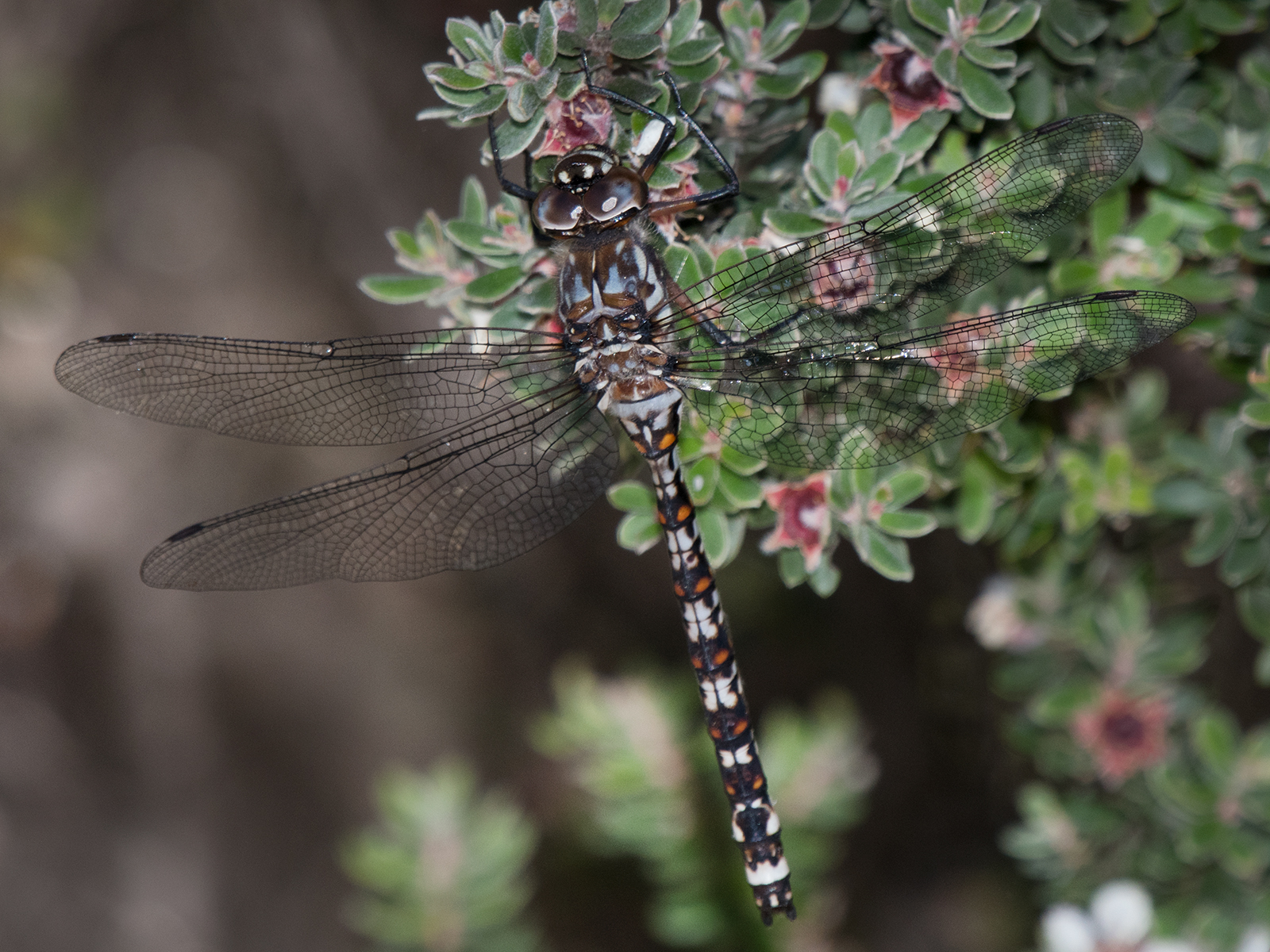
Female

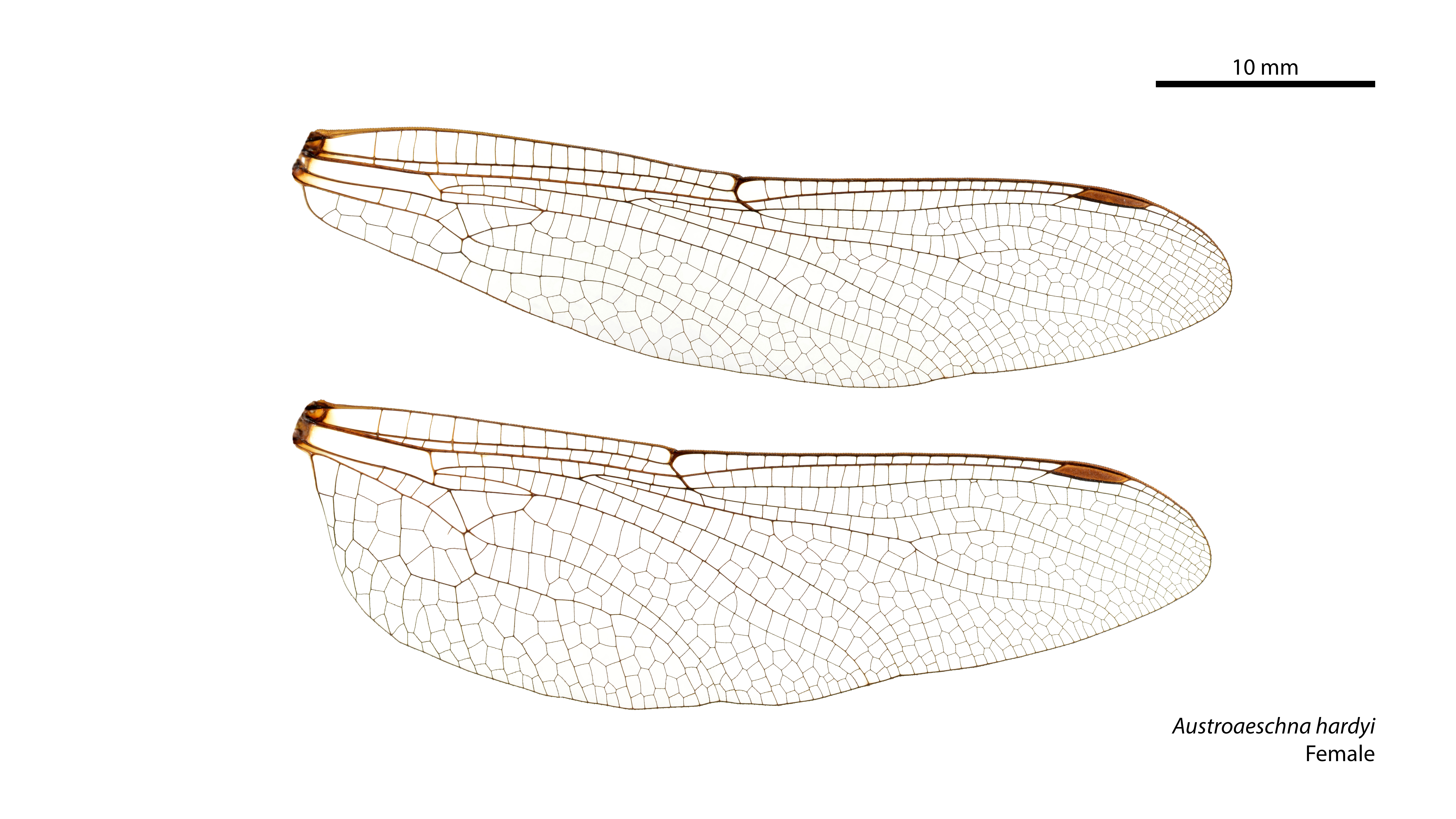
Female wings

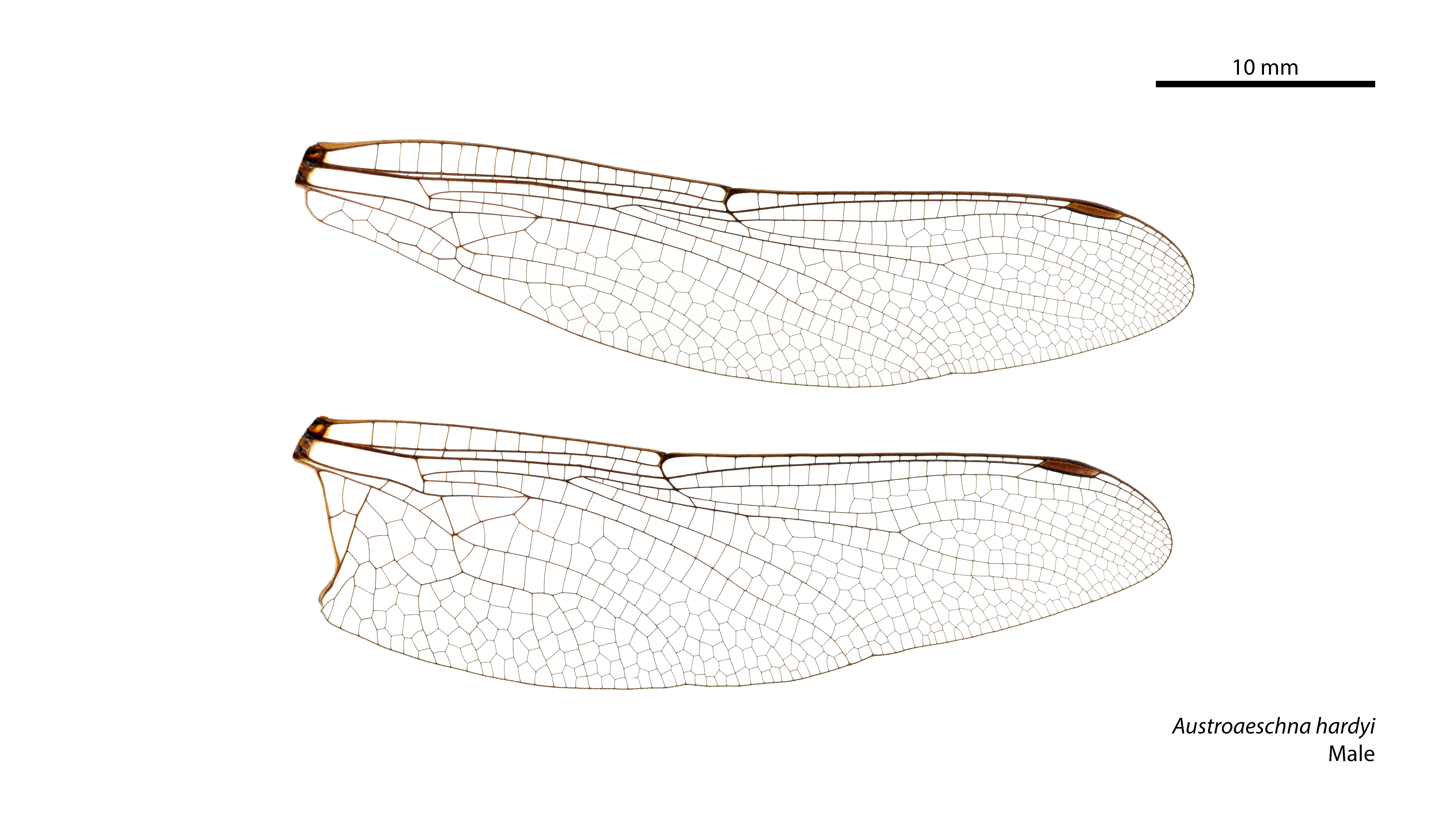
Male wings

== See also ==
- List of dragonflies of Australia
