= Dorylus molestus =

Scientific classification
- Kingdom: Animalia
- Phylum: Arthropoda
- Clade: Pancrustacea
- Class: Insecta
- Order: Hymenoptera
- Family: Formicidae
- Genus: Dorylus
- Species: D. molestus

Binomial name
- Dorylus molestus Wheeler, 1922

Synonyms
- Anomma molestus; Dorylus (Anomma) molestus; Dorylus (Anomma) nigricans molestus; Dorylus molestus (Gerstaecker, 1859); Dorylus nigricans molestus

Species of ant

Dorylus molestus is a species of African army ant.

== Taxonomy ==
Older names include Anomma molestus, Dorylus (Anomma) molestus, Dorylus (Anomma) nigricans molestus, Dorylus molestus (Gerstaecker, 1859) and Dorylus nigricans molestus.

== Description ==
Males or drones of all dorylus species are so called "sausage flies" and are among the largest ant morphs. Some Dorylus molestus queen are the largest known extant ants. Queens typically grow to 5.2 centimetres (2.0 in) but can reach 8 centimetres (3.1 in).

Its size of Molestus queens allows it to hold the world record in egg laying. Workers (sterile females in the presence of the only living queen) range from .3–1.1 centimetres (0.12–0.43 in). Huge and specialised soldier morphs (permanent sterile females) provide protection during migration raids.

== Ecology ==
D molestus is an East African surface swarm raider army ant. The species is important to its ecology; it supports myrmecophile fauna, especially east African birds that attend its raids and depend on the ants' presence in their habitat. Its predatory habits contribute to (mainly) arthropod biodiversity. They attack all animals that are unable to flee and smaller animals that react too slowly, including other Dorylus groups. They invade nests of other social species, such as termites.

D molestus builds temporary surface bivouac nests, which are regularly attacked by a smaller subterran army ant of the same genus, Dorylus (Typhlopone) fulvus badius. A colony engages in foraging raids and also in straight migration raids. Colonies that lose their sole queen sometimes fuse with other colonies or produce (haploid) males before dying out.

The species is capable of surviving in environments other than forests, but it is not yet known if they can survive easily without even a small nearby forest. This ant species inspired early swarm intelligence studies.
