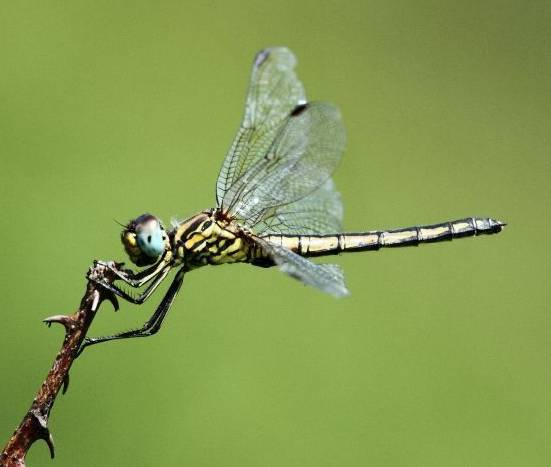
- Female

Conservation status
- Least Concern (IUCN 3.1)

Scientific classification
- Kingdom: Animalia
- Phylum: Arthropoda
- Class: Insecta
- Order: Odonata
- Infraorder: Anisoptera
- Family: Libellulidae
- Genus: Trithemis
- Species: T. dorsalis

Binomial name
- Trithemis dorsalis (Rambur, 1842)

= Trithemis dorsalis =

Species of dragonfly

Trithemis dorsalis, the highland dropwing, is a species of dragonfly in the family Libellulidae. It is found in Angola, the Democratic Republic of the Congo, Guinea, Kenya, Mozambique, Sierra Leone, South Africa, Tanzania, Uganda, Zambia, Zimbabwe, possibly Burundi, and possibly Malawi. Its natural habitats are subtropical or tropical moist lowland forests, dry savanna, moist savanna, subtropical or tropical dry shrubland, subtropical or tropical moist shrubland, rivers, freshwater marshes, and intermittent freshwater marshes.

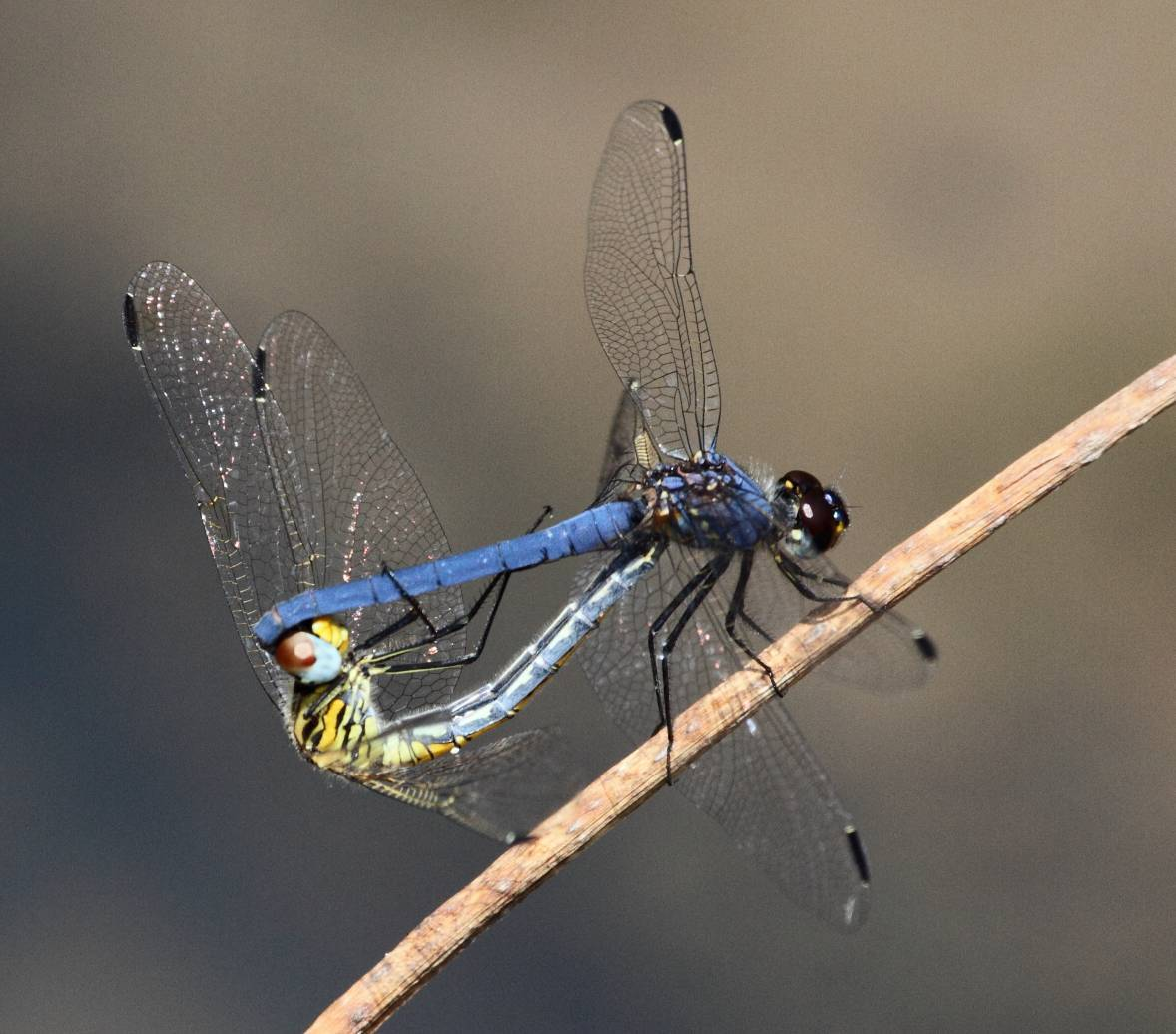
Mating Pair
