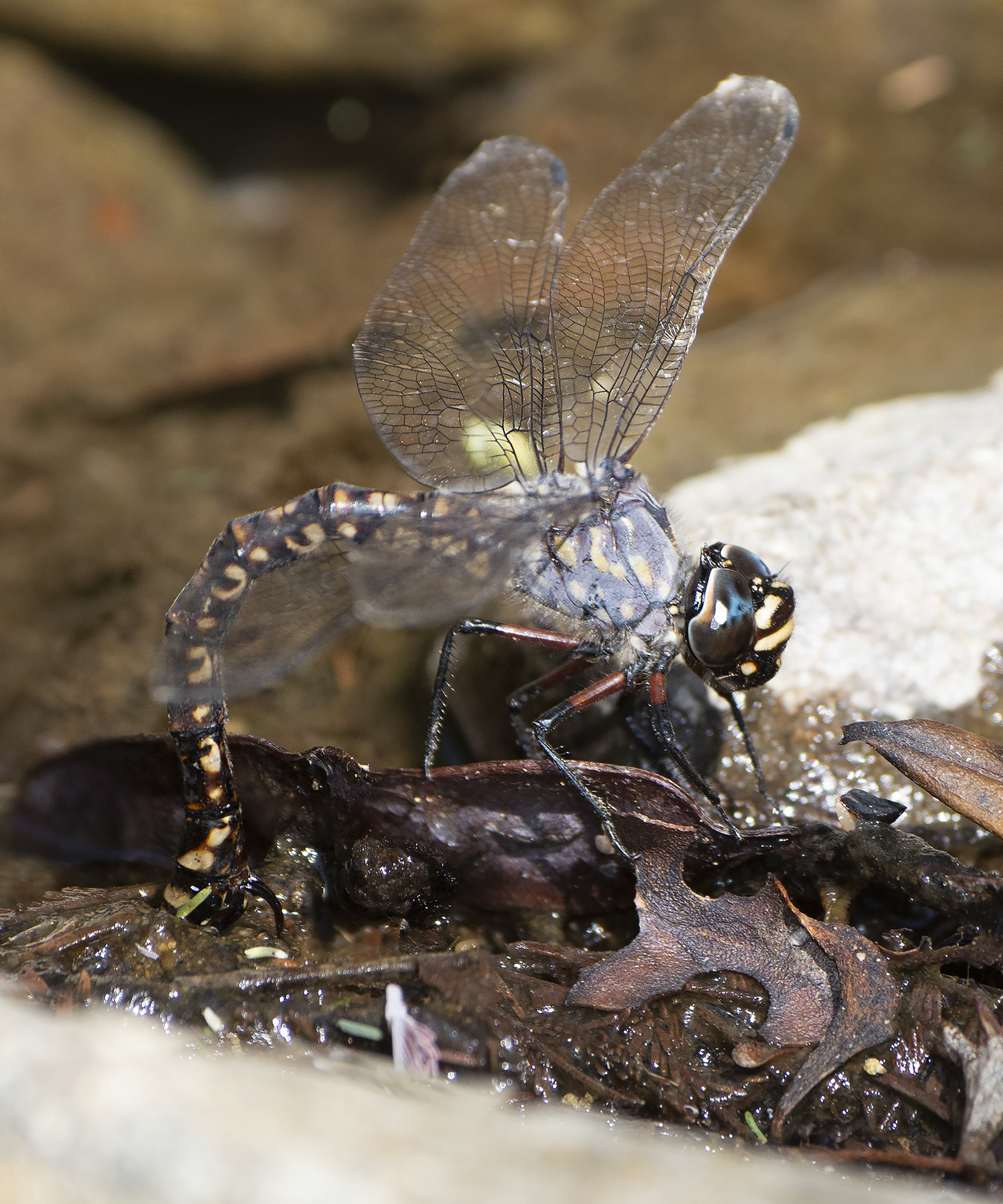
- Female laying her eggs
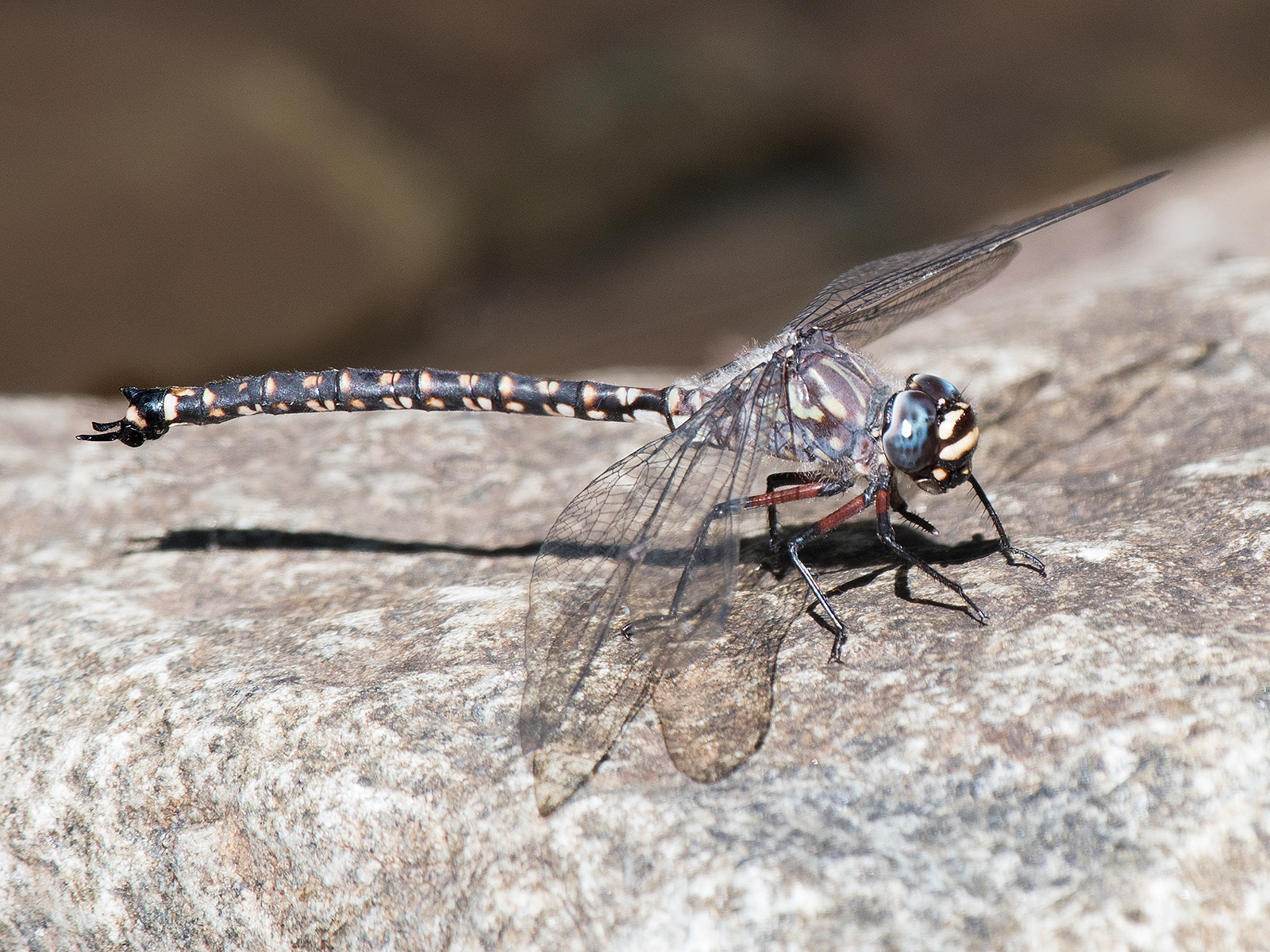
- Male

Conservation status
- Least Concern (IUCN 3.1)

Scientific classification
- Kingdom: Animalia
- Phylum: Arthropoda
- Clade: Pancrustacea
- Class: Insecta
- Order: Odonata
- Suborder: Anisoptera
- Family: Aeshnidae
- Genus: Austroaeschna
- Species: A. tasmanica

Binomial name
- Austroaeschna tasmanica Tillyard, 1916

= Tasmanian darner =

Species of dragonfly

The Tasmanian darner, (Austroaeschna tasmanica), is a species of large dragonfly in the family Aeshnidae, which includes some of the world's largest dragonflies. It is found in Tasmania, Australia. The species was first described by Robert Tillyard in 1916 and inhabits streams and rivers.

Also referred to as "hawkers", the name "darner" derives from the fact that the female abdomen looks like a sewing needle, as it cuts into a plant stem when the female dragonfly lays her eggs through her ovipositor.

The Tasmanian darner is a stout, dark dragonfly with a very dark colouring and light markings. It appears similar to the lesser Tasmanian darner, Austroaeschna hardyi.

== Etymology ==
The genus name Austroaeschna combines the prefix austro- (from Latin auster, meaning “south wind”, hence “southern”) with Aeshna, a genus of dragonflies.

The species name tasmanica is Latin for "of Tasmania", referring to its occurrence there.

== Gallery ==
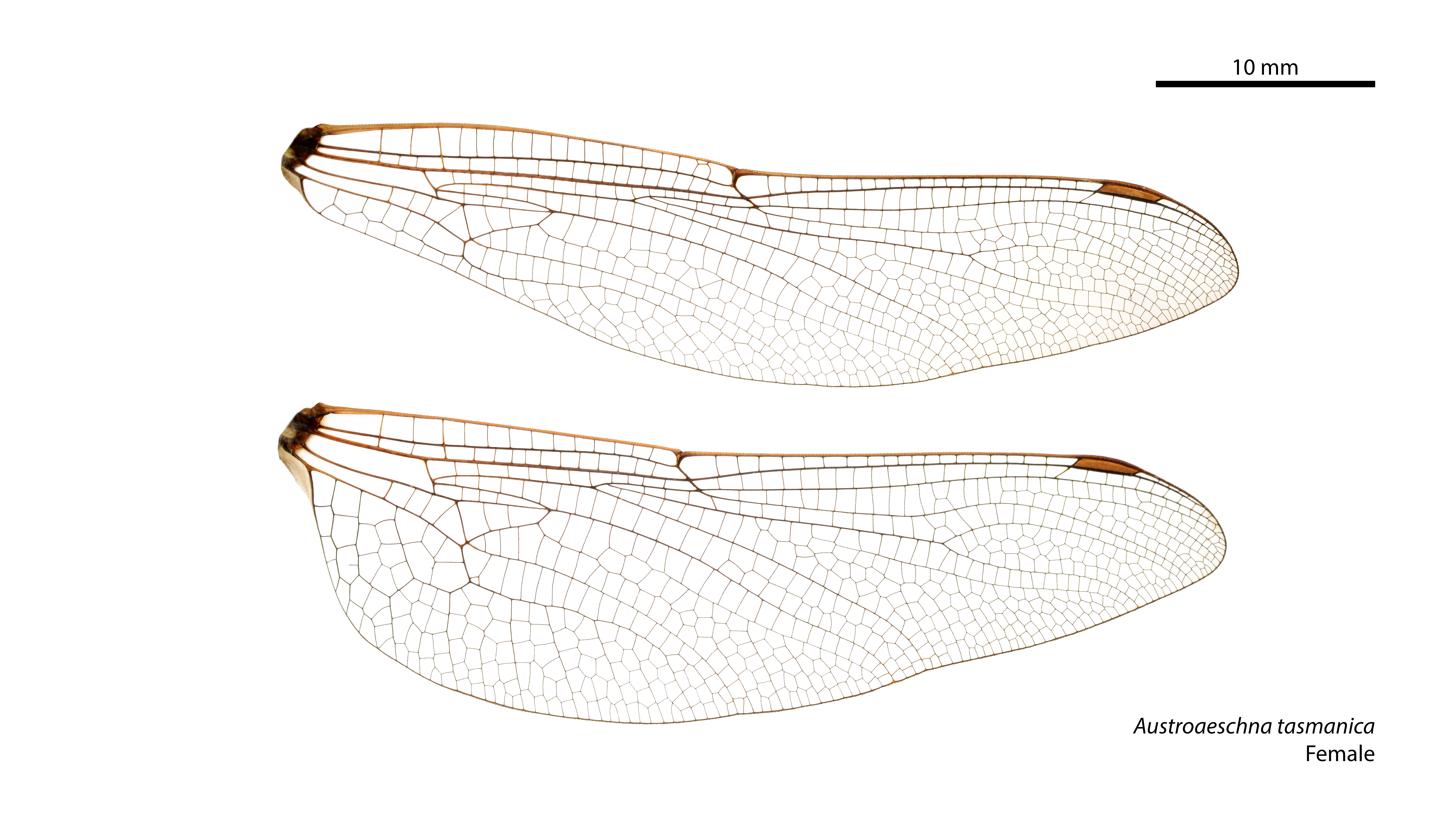
Female wings

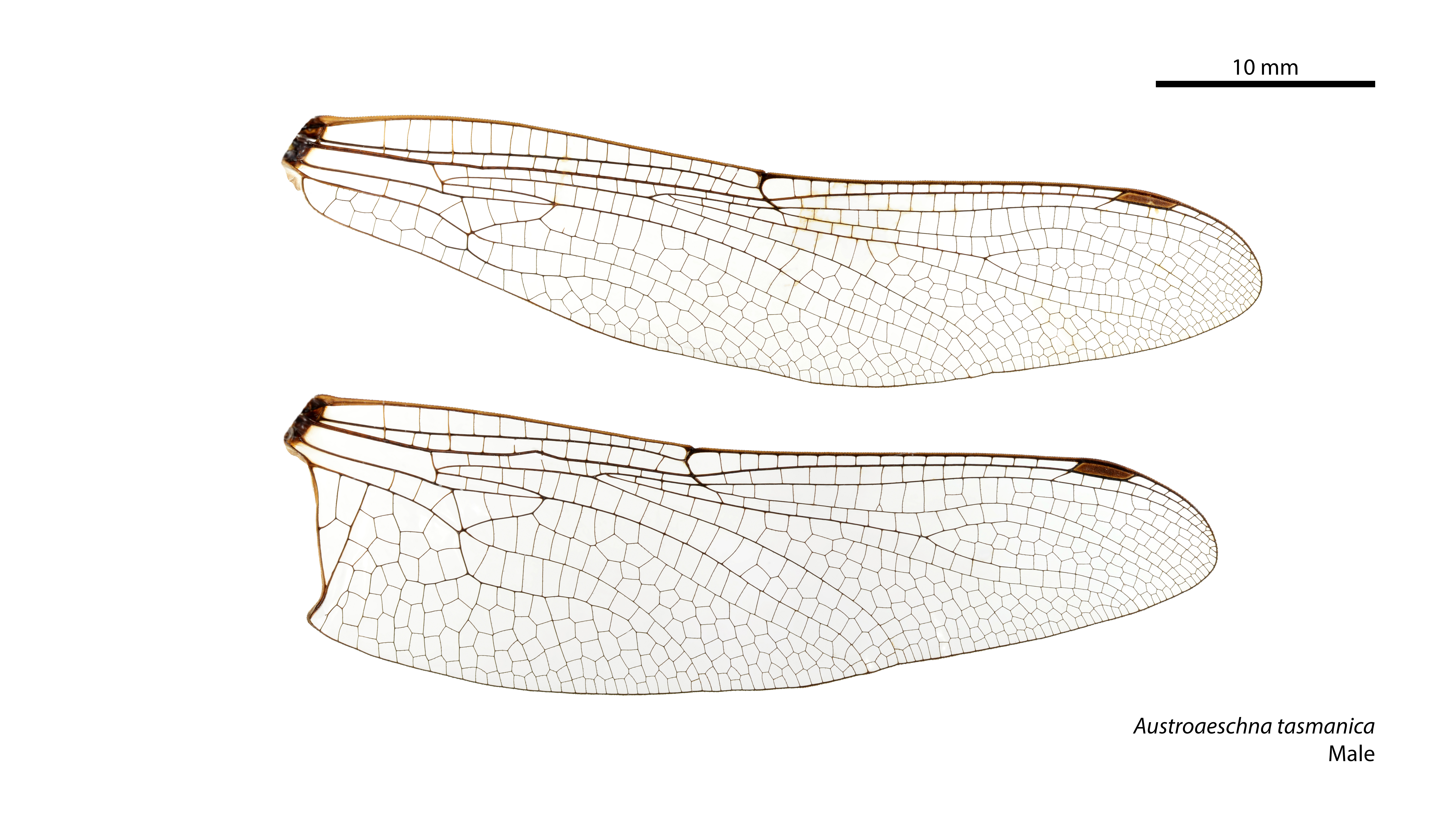
Male wings
