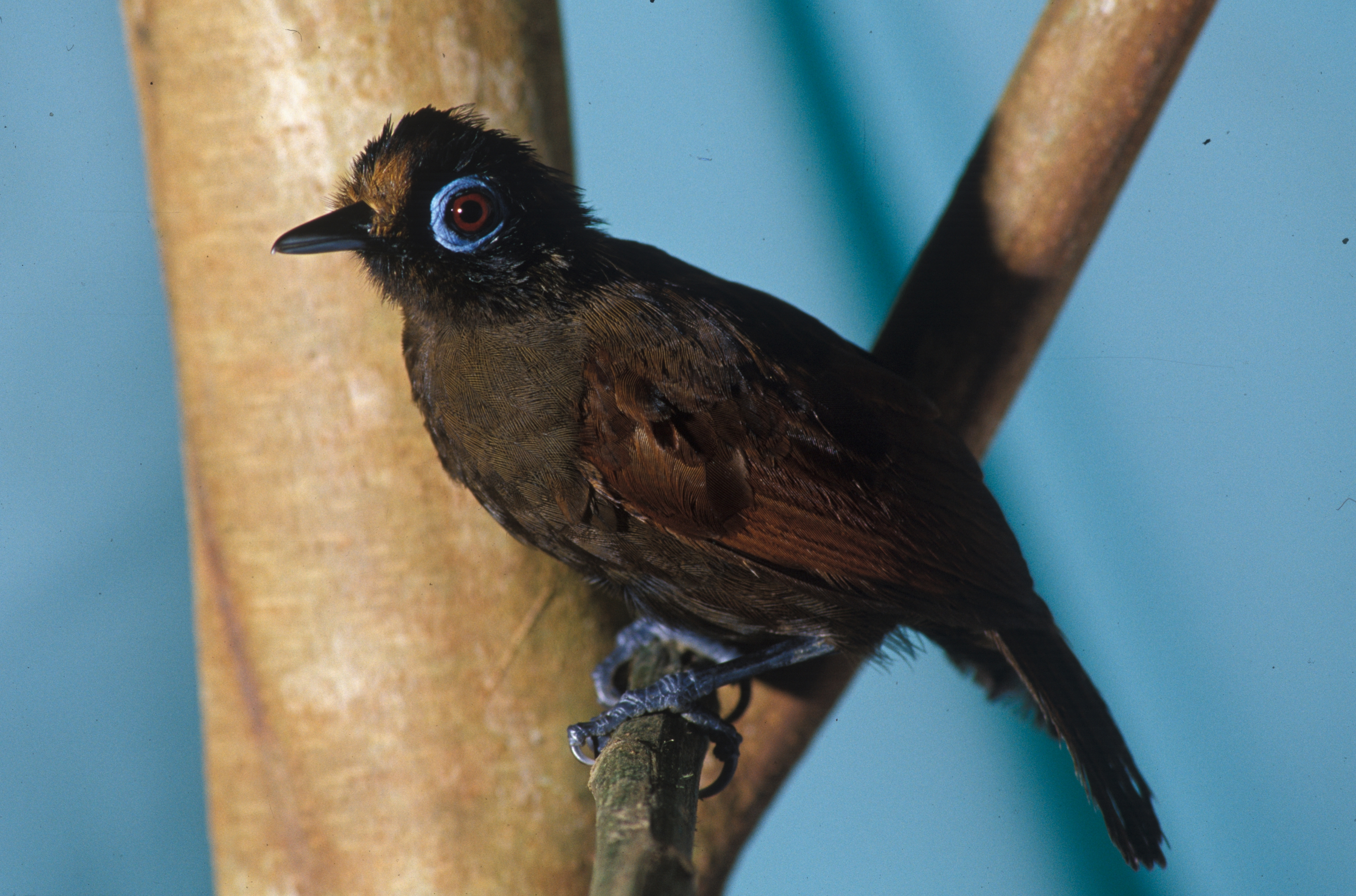
- Hairy-crested antbird (Rhegmatorhina melanosticta)

Scientific classification
- Kingdom: Animalia
- Phylum: Chordata
- Class: Aves
- Order: Passeriformes
- Family: Thamnophilidae
- Genus: Rhegmatorhina; Ridgway, 1888

Type species
- Rhegmatorhina gymnops Ridgway, 1888

= Rhegmatorhina =

Genus of birds

Rhegmatorhina is a genus of birds within the family Thamnophilidae, belonging to the order Passeriformes. Rhegmatorhina is one of the six genera in the Thamnophilidae family, whose birds follow army ants and capture arthropods fleeing their attacks, often described as dedicated or professional ant followers.

The genus contains the bare-eyed antbird (Rhegmatorhina gymnops), chestnut-crested antbird (Rhegmatorhina cristata), Harlequin antbird (Rhegmatorhina berlepschi), hairy-crested antbird (Rhegmatorhina melanosticta) and white-breasted antbird (Rhegmatorhina hoffmannsi).

The genus Rhegmatorhina was proposed by American ornithologist Robert Ridgway in 1888 and was officially described and named by Ridgway in his book Descriptions of New Species and Generations of Birds from the Lower Amazon in the same year. The name Rhegmatorhina originates from Greek, where "rhegma" (ῥῆγμα) means "cleft", and "rhina" (ῥῖνᾰ) means "nostril", which together means "having cleft like nostrils", depending on the external characteristics of the bird species within the genus.

== Appearance ==
=== General characteristics ===
Birds of the genus Rhegmatorhina are usually plump and short-tailed, slightly larger than house sparrows (Passer domestica). They have obvious exposed skin patches around their eyes, with the exposed parts being green or blue. The different species exhibit significant changes in feather patterns. They usually have black, brown, reddish brown, and white feathers arranged in different forms. In addition, they have crown feathers that are longer than other feathers and can stand up and form distinct crests when angry or provoked. Although there are differences in the appearance of different species in this genus, they still exhibit significant morphological similarities and closely related ecologies. For example, the body length of all adult birds in this genus is 13.5–15 cm (5.3–5.9 in), their weight is usually 27–34 g (0.95–1.20 oz), and the ratio of beak length to body length is extremely similar.

=== Differential characteristics ===
There are significant differences in feather color between female and male birds of the genus Rhegmatorhina. For example, the feathers of the male chestnut-crested antbird are mainly black, reddish brown, and olive brown, while the female, although having a similar overall appearance, may have deeper dark spots on its back feathers and a slightly brownish color. Male bare-eyed antbirds have predominantly black feathers, with only the back and tail appearing brown. Female birds, on the other hand, have a dark brown overall color, with only the mouth and eye sockets appearing black. Female white-breasted antbirds and Harlequin antbirds have black striped spots on their abdomen and back, but the males of the same species do not. The back feathewrs of female hairy-crested antbirds have small black and reddish-brown stripes, while the male bird's back feathers are all brown.

In addition, juveniles also have slight differences in appearance from the adults. The crown feathers on the head of juvenile birds are shorter, and the color of their feathers on the body is usually dark, such as gray or brown, rather than having a distinct contrasting color like adult birds. Also, the exposed skin area around the eyes of young birds is relatively small and gradually becomes more prominent as they grow.

== Distribution and habitat ==
=== Distribution ===
Rivers of the Amazon Basin

The Rhegmatorhina genus consists of five species, which are widely distributed in the Amazon Basin. Large rivers define the distribution range of these species, which are only found in endemic areas. The five different regions defined by rivers are Tapajós, Rondônia, Inambari, Napo and Jaú. Among the five species, white brewed antbirds and Harlequin antbirds are only distributed in Rondônia, while hairy crested antbirds are distributed in Inambari and Napo.

The distribution of species within this genus is defined by the main Amazonian rivers, and they generally do not cross rivers to live in another area. However, there are still records indicating the discovery of hybrids of the bare-eyed and white brewed antbirds in the headwaters of the Tapajós River.

=== Biogeography ===
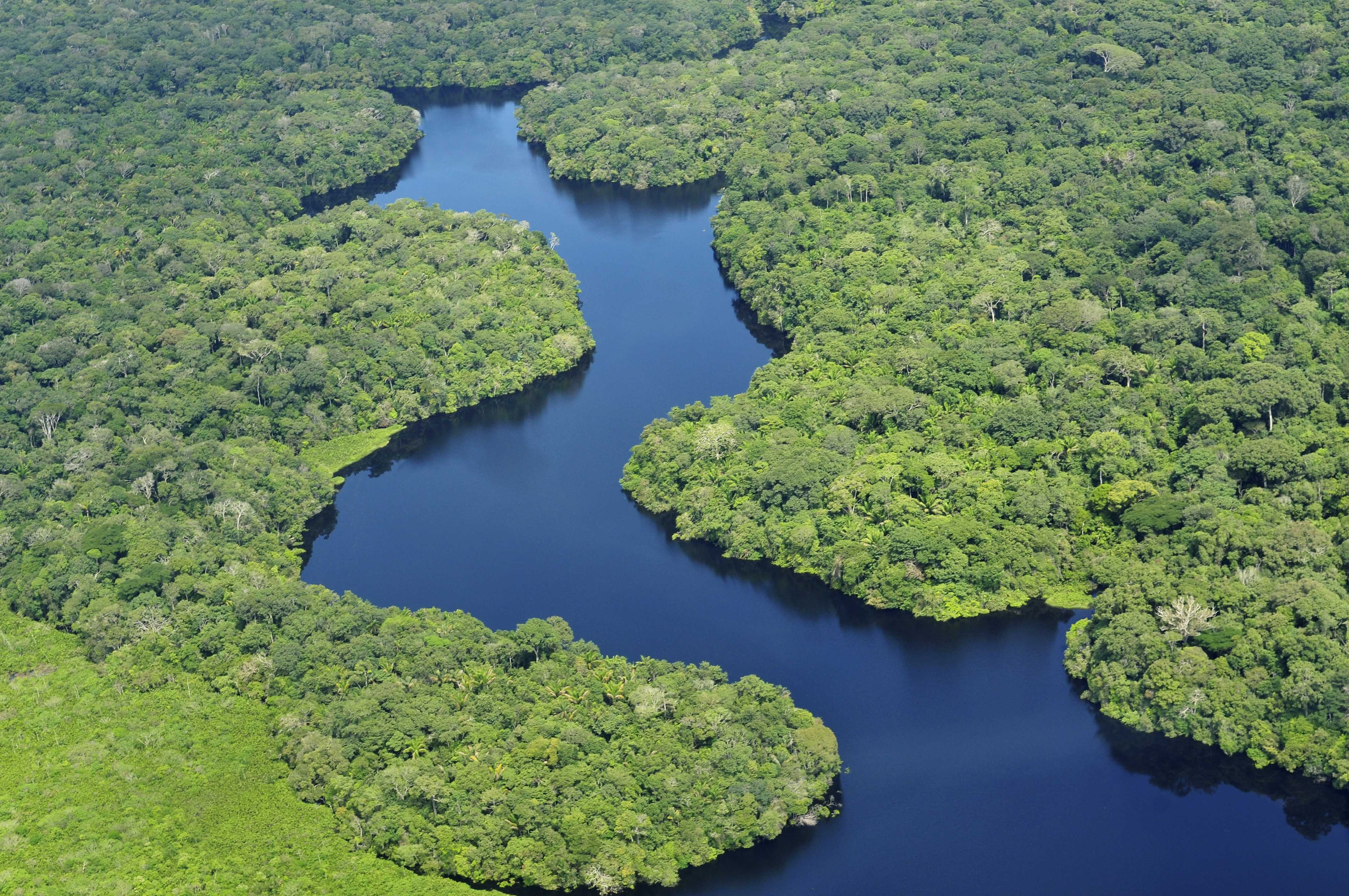
River Barriers affect the distribution of Rhegmatorhina species.

The major Amazonian rivers significantly influence the biogeography and diversification patterns of the genus. These rivers, such as the Madeira, Tapajós, and Solimões, function as natural geographic barriers, limiting gene flow and promoting speciation within the genus. The Madeira River separates Rhegmatorhina into two distinct clades, indicating the biogeographic role of riverine systems.

The distribution of Rhegmatorhina species correlates strongly with these river barriers, with each species typically confined to specific interfluvial regions. Molecular dating analyses reveal that speciation events within Rhegmatorhina coincide with periods of river course shifts and fluctuations during the Quaternary, emphasizing how dynamic landscape features shape species diversification. This geological change has repeatedly reshaped the habitat, creating opportunities for differentiation and speciation.

The barrier effect of rivers is not absolute, as evidenced by hybridization events near river headwaters, suggesting occasional permeability of these barriers under specific ecological or climatic conditions. Thus, Amazonian rivers are pivotal in structuring the genetic and ecological landscapes of Rhegmatorhina, making this genus an excellent model for studying biogeographic processes in tropical ecosystems.

=== Habitat ===
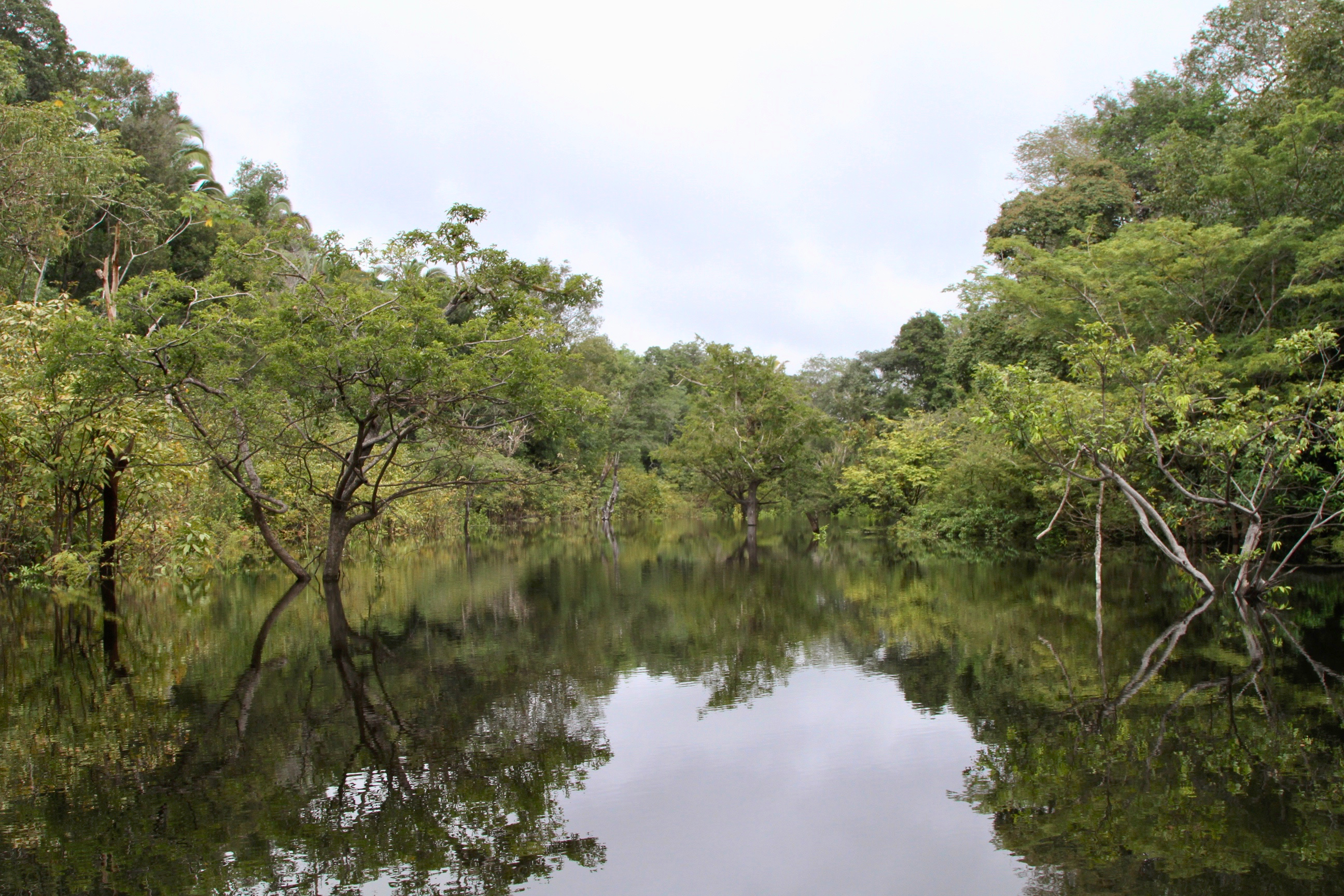
Amazon tropical rainforest

The birds of the Rhegmatorhina genus mainly inhabit tropical lowland rainforests, characterized by dense tree crowns, humid climate, and relatively open understory. The specific rainforest conditions vary slightly due to geographical distribution. The formation of this environment may be caused by secondary growth of trees due to human interference or natural disaster damage, or it may be due to heavy rainfall, which often leads to the erosion of trees by organisms such as fungi and insects. For example, the Western Amazon hairy crested and chestnut crested antbirds typically prefer very humid forests with lush moss-covered shrubs and a variety of low shrubs. Bare-eyed, white-breasted, and Harlequin antbirds in the central Amazon typically live in more open, seasonally dry forests with good soil drainage and fewer epiphytes.

These rainforest habitats all have ground covered with a thin layer of fallen leaves, which are quickly decomposed by insects and fungi. The gaps and dense secondary growth patches provide a good living environment for ants. The five species of Rhegmatorhina all live in habitats with a large number of army ant colonies, which is crucial for them to follow the foraging behaviour of army ants.

== Behavior ==
=== Feeding ===
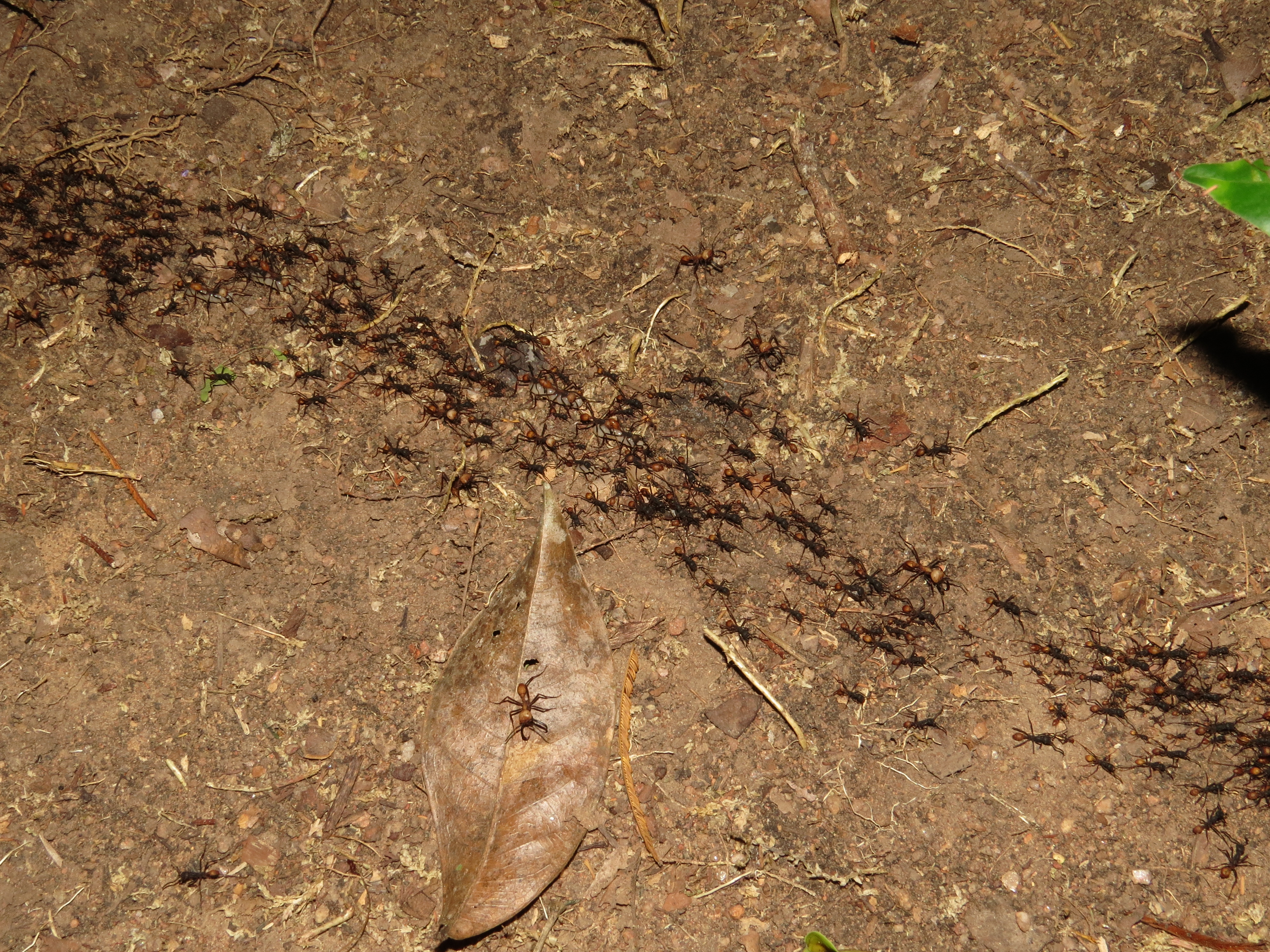
Army Ant (Eciton burchellii), the main food of Rhegmatorhina.

Birds of the Rhegmatorhina genus have a very limited food source and rarely forage independently. Their foraging behavior mainly relies on swarms of army ants near their habitat, preying on arthropods that escape attacks from the army ants. Based on current observations of the genus, they never live far away from military ant colonies. They spend most of their time waiting for prey on low branches or saplings between 10 and 50 cm (3.9 and 19.7 in) above the ant colony. If no prey is found within one or two minutes, they will move to a new location to continue waiting. When they discover prey, they will fly quickly or jump short, and after catching it, they will quickly return to their original waiting location.

=== Nesting ===
Birds of the Rhegmatorhina genus typically build cup-shaped nests, mainly composed of plant fibres and leaves, and most of the time they choose palm leaves. Their nests are usually located within understory vegetation, which can provide them with sufficient coverage and protection.

=== Vocalization and communication ===
The calls of birds in the Rhegmatorhina genus have subtle differences, but they all produce similar sounds when faced with the same situation. For example, when disturbed by other organisms, all five species will make a low-pitched sound. And when they are frightened or excited, their cries become sharp and loud. Some sounds can only be made by specific birds; for example, only bare-eyed, white-breasted, and Harlequin antbirds emit a faint and unpleasant cry when stunned.

As of 2025 current data cannot provide a definitive conclusion on whether birds of the genus communicate through their vocalizations. But when several birds of the same species are together, they will keep making faint voices.

=== Breeding ===
Observations on the reproduction of birds in the genus are limited. It is known through analysing changes in the number of young birds that they usually engage in large-scale reproduction from February to April. Among them, Harlequin antbirds breed the most in February each year, while white-breasted antbirds breed the most from March to April each year.

Birds of the Rhegmatorhina genus typically begin courtship and mating 10-20 weeks after hatching. Male birds that have not mated are often observed in all five species. After they lay eggs, females obtain almost all of their food from males. The male will either give the food directly to the femaled or retreat and be caught by the female when they find prey.

Young birds are taken care of by adults for a long time after birth, and their dependence period is also very long. During this period, young birds will learn foraging techniques from adult birds.

=== Ecological role ===
Ant-following behavior represents a highly specialized ecological strategy within tropical forest birds, and Rhegmatorhina species exemplify this. They exhibit obligate dependence on army ants, particularly Eciton burchellii, to flush out prey items such as insects and other arthropods. This strategy significantly shapes their ecological roles as secondary consumers within rainforest ecosystems.

Their strict ecological dependency renders them highly vulnerable to environmental disturbances, including habitat fragmentation, logging, and climate-induced changes that may impact army-ant populations. Consequently, Rhegmatorhina species serve as valuable ecological indicators, reflecting the health and stability of Amazonian rainforest ecosystems.

== Status ==
Image	Common name	Scientific name	Status
	Bare-eyed antbird	Rhegmatorhina gymnops	VU Vulnerable
	Harlequin antbird	Rhegmatorhina berlepschi	LC Least Concern
	White-breasted antbird	Rhegmatorhina hoffmannsi	LC Least Concern
	Chestnut-crested antbird	Rhegmatorhina cristata	LC Least Concern
	Hairy-crested antbird	Rhegmatorhina melanosticta	LC Least Concern

Except for the bare-eyed antbird, the conservation status of all species in the genus is listed as Least Concern. The bare-eyed antbird was also defined as Least Concern but was changed to a Vulnerable species in 2012. Human destruction of the Amazon rainforest habitat may have already affected the birds of the genus.

== Taxonomy ==
The genus Rhegmatorhina belongs to the family Thamnophilidae within the order Passeriformes, commonly known as antbirds. According to molecular phylogenetic analyses, Rhegmatorhina forms part of a larger monophyletic clade known as obligate army-ant-following antbirds, which also includes genera such as Pithys, Phlegopsis, Gymnopithys, Phaenostictus, and Willisornis. This specific ecological specialization of relying on army ants to flush out prey represents a conserved evolutionary trait shared by these genera, underpinning their systematic relationships.

Molecular genetic studies have significantly clarified the taxonomic relationships within Rhegmatorhina. Ribas conducted extensive phylogenetic analyses, incorporating mitochondrial DNA (mtDNA) and nuclear gene sequences from 120 specimens across the genus's range. Their study supported the monophyly of the genus and identified two main clades clearly separated by the Madeira River, one comprising species distributed west of the river (R. melanosticta and R. cristata), and the other including eastern species (R. gymnops, R. hoffmannsi, and R. berlepschi).

Further phylogenetic analyses indicated that the diversification within Rhegmatorhina occurred primarily during the Quaternary period, influenced significantly by the geological history of the Amazon Basin, especially the formation and rearrangement of major river systems. These large Amazonian rivers, particularly the Madeira, Tapajós, and Solimões rivers, have acted as critical barriers, facilitating speciation events within the genus.

Recent studies on Rhegmatorhina have utilized multilocus genetic approaches to resolve the evolutionary relationships and demographic history of the genus. Analysis of mitochondrial and nuclear gene regions consistently supported the monophyly of Rhegmatorhina and revealed two well-supported clades split by the Madeira River. Divergence dating placed the origin of crown Rhegmatorhina in the Quaternary, less than two million years ago. This dating is highly consistent with significant landscape and climate fluctuations within the Amazon Basin, supporting the hypothesis that links the biodiversity of the Amazon to the most recent geological events rather than the older pre-Quaternary events.

Mitochondrial haplotype networks demonstrated strong lineage structuring with no shared haplotypes among species, while nuclear markers showed limited allele sorting, indicating recent divergence and large effective population sizes. These results highlight both the genetic distinctiveness and ongoing evolutionary processes within the genus.

== In culture ==
Birds of the genus hold cultural significance for indigenous communities in the Amazon Basin. The hairy-crested antbird is known locally by the Quichua-speaking communities near the Rio Napo as "tamia anfangu pishcu," derived from the local term for the army ant, "tamia aniangu." This nomenclature highlights the intimate ecological relationship between these birds and the army ants.
