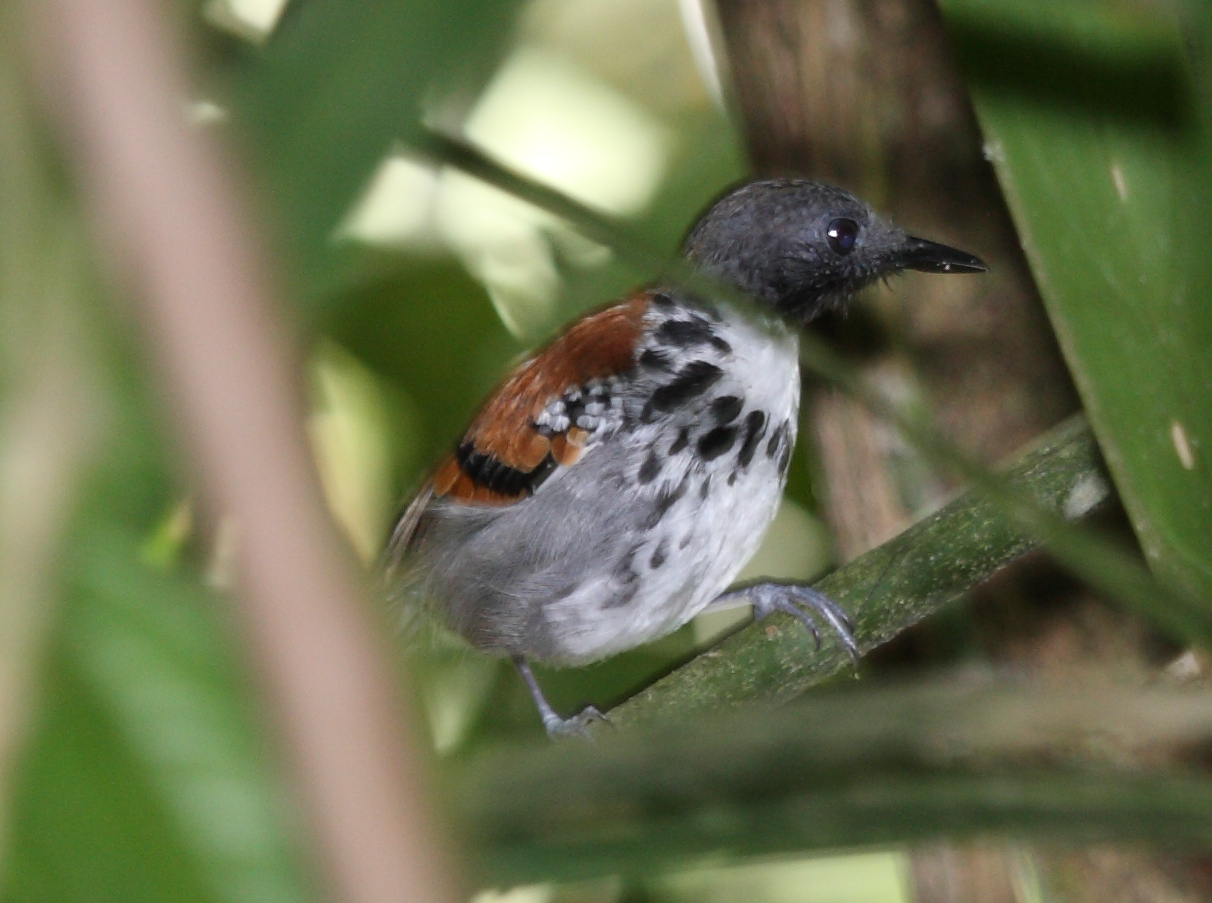
- Male in Panama

Conservation status
- Least Concern (IUCN 3.1)

Scientific classification
- Kingdom: Animalia
- Phylum: Chordata
- Class: Aves
- Order: Passeriformes
- Family: Thamnophilidae
- Genus: Hylophylax
- Species: H. naevioides

Binomial name
- Hylophylax naevioides (Lafresnaye, 1847)

= Spotted antbird =

Species of bird

The spotted antbird (Hylophylax naevioides) is a species of bird in subfamily Thamnophilinae of family Thamnophilidae, the "typical antbirds". It is found in Colombia, Costa Rica, Ecuador, Honduras, Nicaragua, and Panama.

== Taxonomy and systematics ==
The spotted antbird was described by Frédéric de Lafresnaye in 1847 as Conopophago naeivoides ("spotted gnateater") and later transferred to genus Hylophylax that had been erected in 1909 by Robert Ridgway. It shares the genus with the spot-backed antbird (H. naevius) and dot-backed antbird (H. punctulatus). It and the spot-backed antbird have been treated as sister species.

The spotted antbird has two subspecies, the nominate H. n. naevioides (Lafresnaye, 1847) and H. n. capnitis (Bangs, 1906).

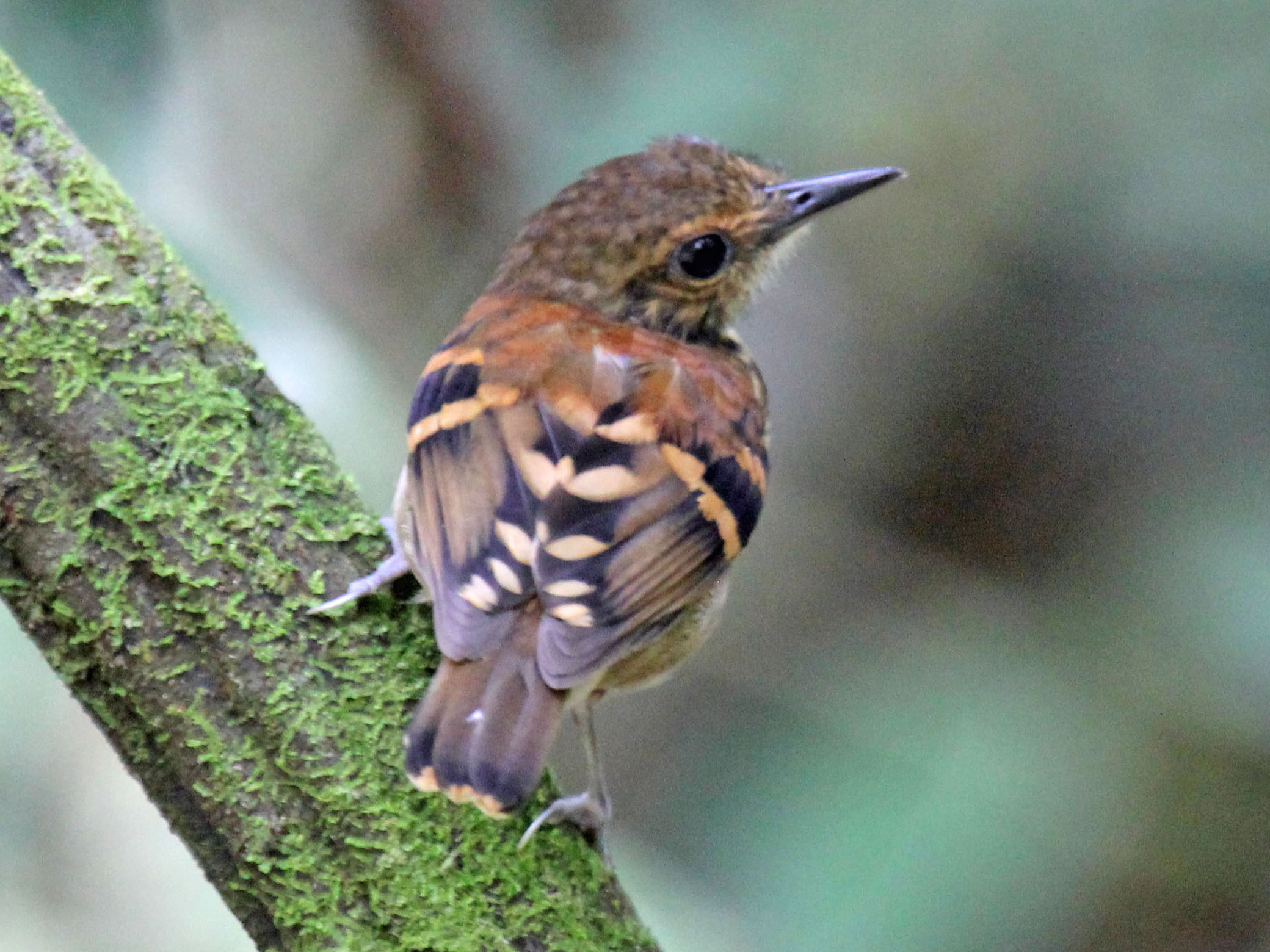
Female in Panama

== Description ==
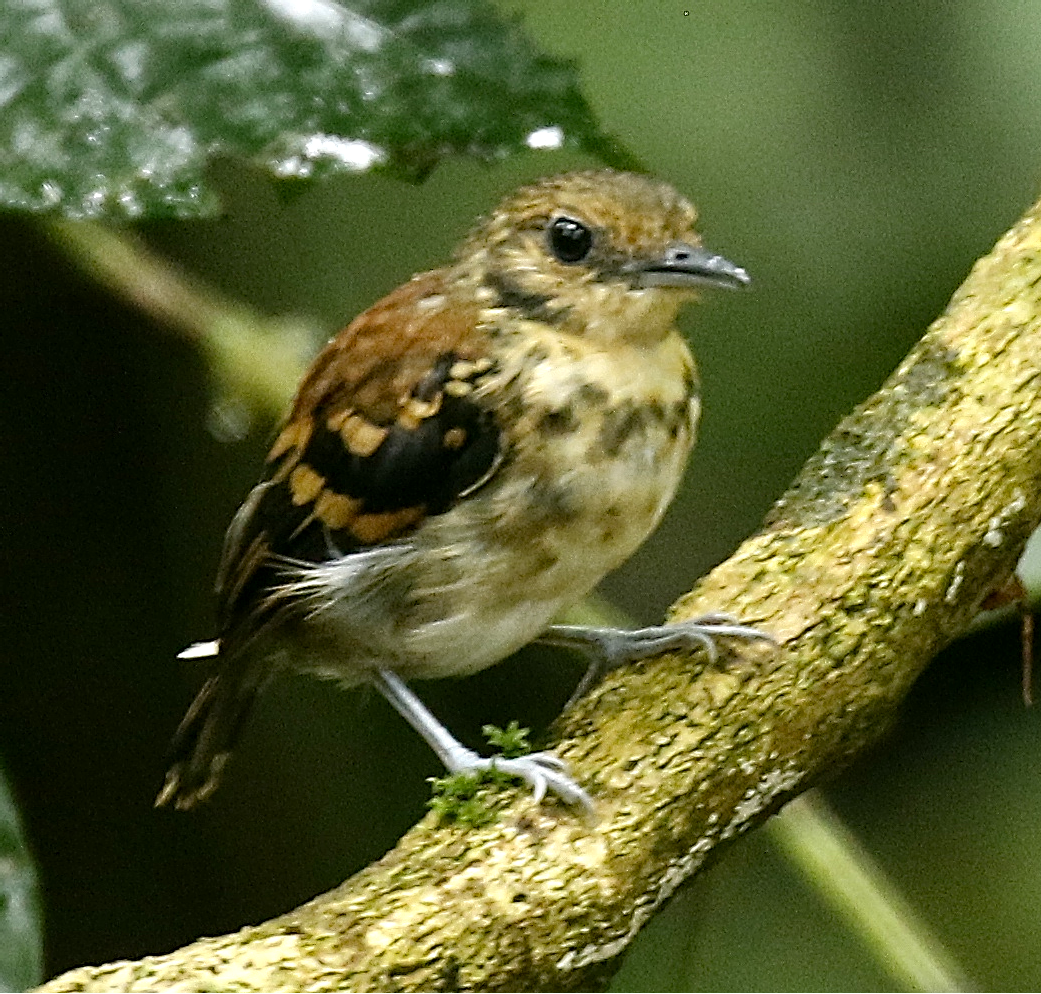
Juvenile at Altos Del Maria, El Valle, Panama

The spotted antbird is 10 to 12 cm (3.9 to 4.7 in) long and weighs 15 to 19.5 g (0.53 to 0.69 oz). The two subspecies have essentially the same plumage. Adult males have a gray forehead and a grayish brown to olive-brown crown and nape. Their back is chestnut with a white and chestnut patch between their scapulars; the white is usually not visible. Their uppertail coverts are dull cinnamon. Their wings are black with cinnamon-rufous tips on the coverts. Their tail is grayish brown with cinnamon tips on most of the feathers (pale brown to white on the outermost) and a black band above the tips. Their lores and ear coverts are gray and their cheeks and throat are black. Their underparts are mostly white with a "necklace" of heavy black spots across the breast. Their sides are gray, their flanks brownish buff, and their undertail coverts pale brownish buff. Adult females have a dull brown crown and nape. Their back is the same chestnut as the male's and also has a hidden white and chestnut interscapular patch. Their wings and tail are like the male's. The sides of their head are blackish slate with pale cinnamon-brown lines. Their throat is white to buff. Their underparts are mostly white with irregular olive or dull gray spots on the breast. Their sides and flanks are olive to olive-buff. Juveniles are very similar to adults; males have grayish feathers on their chest and vent area and females have rusty white feathers there.

== Distribution and habitat ==
Subspecies H. n. capnitis of the spotted antbird occurs north of the nominate. It is found on the Caribbean slope of Honduras, Nicaragua, and Costa Rica, a bit of the Pacific slope of northwestern Costa Rica, and the Caribbean and Pacific slopes of western Panama. The nominate subspecies is found on both slopes of central and eastern Panama, northern Colombia, and through western Colombia into western Ecuador as far as Guayas and Chimborazo provinces. The species inhabits humid lowland forest both primary and mature secondary throughout its range. It favors thick undergrowth in the forest interior. In elevation it reaches 1,000 m (3,300 ft) in Central America and Colombia but only 300 m (1,000 ft) in Ecuador.

== Behavior ==
=== Movement ===
The spotted antbird is a year-round resident throughout its range.

=== Feeding ===
The spotted antbird feeds primarily on a wide variety insects but also includes significant amounts of other arthropods plus lizards and frogs. Insects taken include crickets, cockroaches, moths (adult and larval), sowbugs, ants, and beetles. It is a facultative army ant follower, catching about half of its prey as it flees the swarms. At swarms they sometimes loosely associate with mixed-species feeding flocks. They take the other half of their away from swarms, including an observation of a bird following an agouti to take prey it flushed. They forage as individuals or pairs, and mostly within about 2 m (7 ft) of the ground. They take prey with sallies from a perch to the ground and by gleaning and lunging for prey on leaves, twigs, and branches.

=== Breeding ===
The spotted antbird is socially monogamous and forms long-term pair bonds. Males court females with food offerings. Where the species' breeding season is known it coincides with the early part of the local wet season, for example from April to July in Costa Rica and somewhat earlier in Panama. Its nest is an open cup. Most of the know nests were built from fungal rhizomorphs and often appeared like a pile of debris. They were attached to branches within 2 m (7 ft) of the ground. Most clutches are of two eggs; occasionally a third is laid. The eggs are white to off-white and spotted and streaked with reddish brown. Both sexes incubate the clutch though usually the female alone does so at night. The incubation period is about 18 days and fledging occurs about 11 days after hatch.

=== Vocalization ===
The spotted antbird's most common song is a variable number of repeated syllables each composed of a peeee whistle followed by a short ti note, giving a full sequence peeeeeti-peeeti-peeeti-peeeti-peeeti-peeeti-peeeti-peeeti of variable length. Both sexes sing, with the male's song longer than female's. The species' calls include a chirr in response to disturbance, a chip alarm call, and aggressive bugles and snarls. Other calls are described as 'hissing', 'whimpering', 'peeping', 'squeaking', and 'screaming'.

== Status ==
The IUCN has assessed the spotted antbird as being of Least Concern. It has a very large range; its population size is not known and is believed to be decreasing. No immediate threats have been identified. It is considered common across its range and to "exhibit medium sensitivity to disturbance". However, "[d]eforestation throughout the species' range is such that much of the unprotected habitat formerly occupied has now gone, creating some range contractions and distributional gaps".
