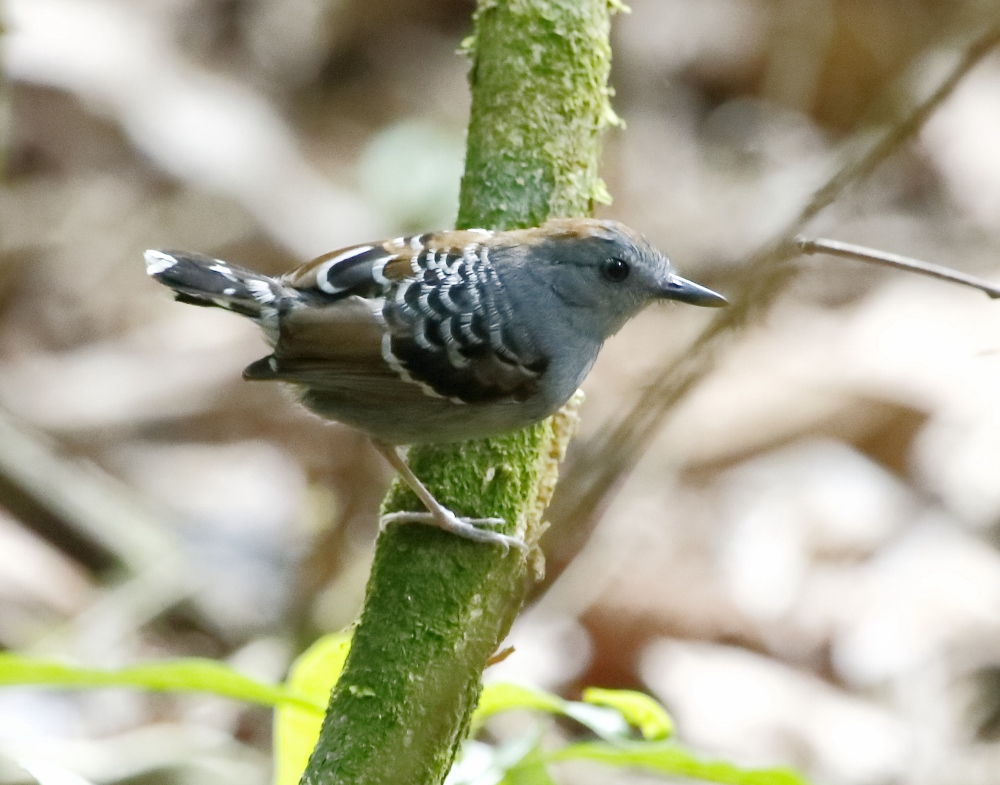

Conservation status
- Least Concern (IUCN 3.1)

- Least Concern (IUCN 3.1)

Scientific classification
- Kingdom: Animalia
- Phylum: Chordata
- Class: Aves
- Order: Passeriformes
- Family: Thamnophilidae
- Genus: Willisornis
- Species: W. vidua

Binomial name
- Willisornis vidua (Hellmayr, 1905)
- Range of W. v. vidua (see taxonomy and distribution sections)

Synonyms
- Hypocnemis poecilonotus vidua; Hylophylax poecilonota vidua; Dichropogon poecilonota vidua; Willisornis poecilonota vidua

= Xingu scale-backed antbird =

Species of bird

The Xingu scale-backed antbird (Willisornis vidua) is a species of bird in subfamily Thamnophilinae of family Thamnophilidae, the "typical antbirds". It is endemic to Brazil.

== Taxonomy and systematics ==
What is now the Xingu scale-backed antbird was long considered a subspecies of Willisornis poecilinotus, which at the time was called the scale-backed antbird. When the Xingu scale-backed antbird was recognized as a separate species, the reduced W. poecilinotus was renamed the common scale-backed antbird. Even before the split the species had a complicated taxonomic history, being variously assigned to genera Hypocnemis, Hylophylax, and Dichropogon before the current Willisornis was created for it. It was described and illustrated by the German ornithologist Jean Cabanis in 1847 and given the binomial name Hypocnemis poecilinotus. The species' English name refers to the Xingu River.

The Xingu scale-backed antbird's taxonomy remains unsettled. The International Ornithological Committee, the South American Classification Committee of the American Ornithological Society, and the Clements taxonomy assign it two subspecies: the nominate W. v. vidua (Hellmayr, 1905) and W. v. nigrigula (Snethlage, 1914). However, BirdLife International's Handbook of the Birds of the World (HBW) treats the two taxa as separate species, respectively called the Xingu and Tapajos scale-backed antbirds.

This article follows the one species, two subspecies model.

== Description ==
The Xingu scale-backed antbird is 12 to 13 cm (4.7 to 5.1 in) long and weighs 14 to 19.5 g (0.49 to 0.69 oz). Adult males of the nominate subspecies are mostly gray; their upperparts are darker than their underparts. They have a white patch between the scapulars. Their lower back has white-edged black patches that give it its English name. Their wings and tail are black with white edges and tips on many feathers. Adult females have a warm brown crown and a gray face. Their upperparts are warm brown and their underparts are gray. Their throat is white. Both sexes have a grayish iris, a black bill, and pale gray legs and feet. Males of subspecies W. v. nigrigula have a black throat and slightly darker upperparts than the nominate. Females of nigrigula have a larger white patch between the scapulars than the nominate but are otherwise identical.

== Distribution and habitat ==
The Xingu scale-backed antbird is found in south-central and eastern Amazonian Brazil south of the Amazon River. The nominate subspecies occurs between the Rio Xingu and western Maranhão state and south into northern Tocantins state. Subspecies W. v. nigrigula occurs further west, between the rios Tapajós and Xingu and south into northern Mato Grosso state. The species primarily inhabits the understorey of humid terra firme evergreen forest and also occurs in várzea forest. In elevation it ranges from sea level to 800 m (2,600 ft).

== Behavior ==
=== Movement ===
The Xingu scale-backed antbird is believed to be a year-round resident throughout its range.

=== Feeding ===
The Xingu scale-backed antbird feeds mostly on a wide variety of arthropods. It typically forages individually, in pairs, and in family groups, usually within about 1 m (3 ft) of the ground though sometimes as high as 3 m (10 ft) and rarely to 5 m (16 ft). It follows swarms of army ants that pass through its territory to capture prey fleeing the ants, but it just as often forages away from ant swarms. It captures prey mostly by short sallies from a perch to the ground but also to foliage, branches, and vines. It sometimes stays on the ground probing and flicking leaf litter.

=== Breeding ===
The Xingu scale-backed antbird's breeding season has not been defined. A few nests are known; they were cups of dried leaves and plant fibers. Two were in holes atop rotten stumps and a third was on the ground in leaf litter at the base of a palm. The only known clutch was of two eggs; they were pinkish violet with dark streaks and blotches. Though only the female was seen incubating them, it is assumed that both sexes do so in common with other antbirds. The incubation period, time to fledging, and other details of parental care are not known.

=== Vocalization ===
The Xingu scale-backed antbird's song is "a series of long upslurred notes, which are frequency-modulated in an even pattern". Its calls include "a twitter formed by a short...high-pitched series of clear, almost tinkling, musical notes that descends slightly in frequency", "a descending chirr", and a "raspy series of 3–4 cheery, cheery, churry, churry notes".

== Status ==
The IUCN follows HBW taxonomy and so has separately assessed the two subspecies. Both are considered as being of Least Concern. Both have a large range and an unknown population size that is believed to be stable. No immediate threats to either have been identified. The species is considered fairly common throughout its range. Though its range includes several large protected areas, the eastern parts "have been subject to extensive and ongoing deforestation and fragmentation during recent decades".
