= Edwin Willis =

Edwin Willis may refer to:

- Edwin E. Willis (1904–1972), American politician and attorney from Louisiana
- Edwin B. Willis (1893–1963), film set designer and decorator
- Edwin O'Neill Willis (1935–2015), American ornithologist
