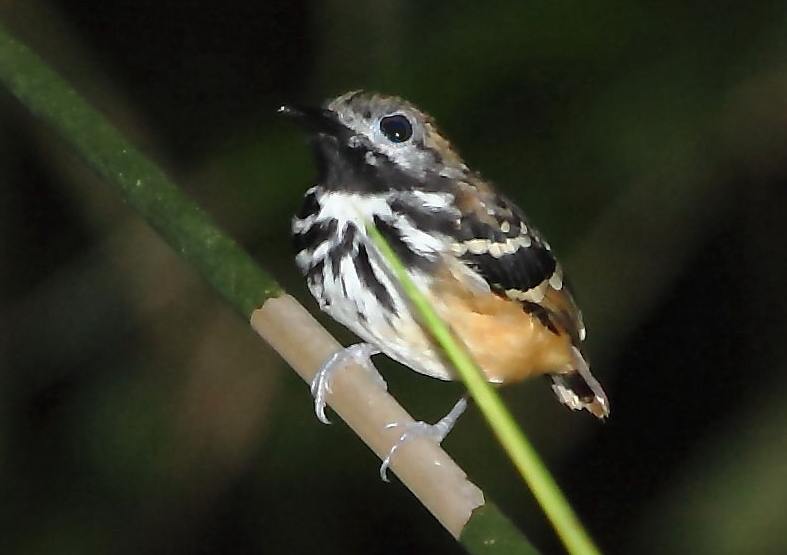
- Male, Mato Grosso, Brazil

Conservation status
- Least Concern (IUCN 3.1)

Scientific classification
- Kingdom: Animalia
- Phylum: Chordata
- Class: Aves
- Order: Passeriformes
- Family: Thamnophilidae
- Genus: Hylophylax
- Species: H. punctulatus

Binomial name
- Hylophylax punctulatus (Des Murs, 1856)

Synonyms
- Rhopotera punctulata; Rhopothera guttata

= Dot-backed antbird =

Species of bird

The dot-backed antbird (Hylophylax punctulatus) is a species of bird in subfamily Thamnophilinae of family Thamnophilidae, the "typical antbirds". It is found in Bolivia, Brazil, Colombia, Ecuador, Peru, and Venezuela.

== Taxonomy and systematics ==
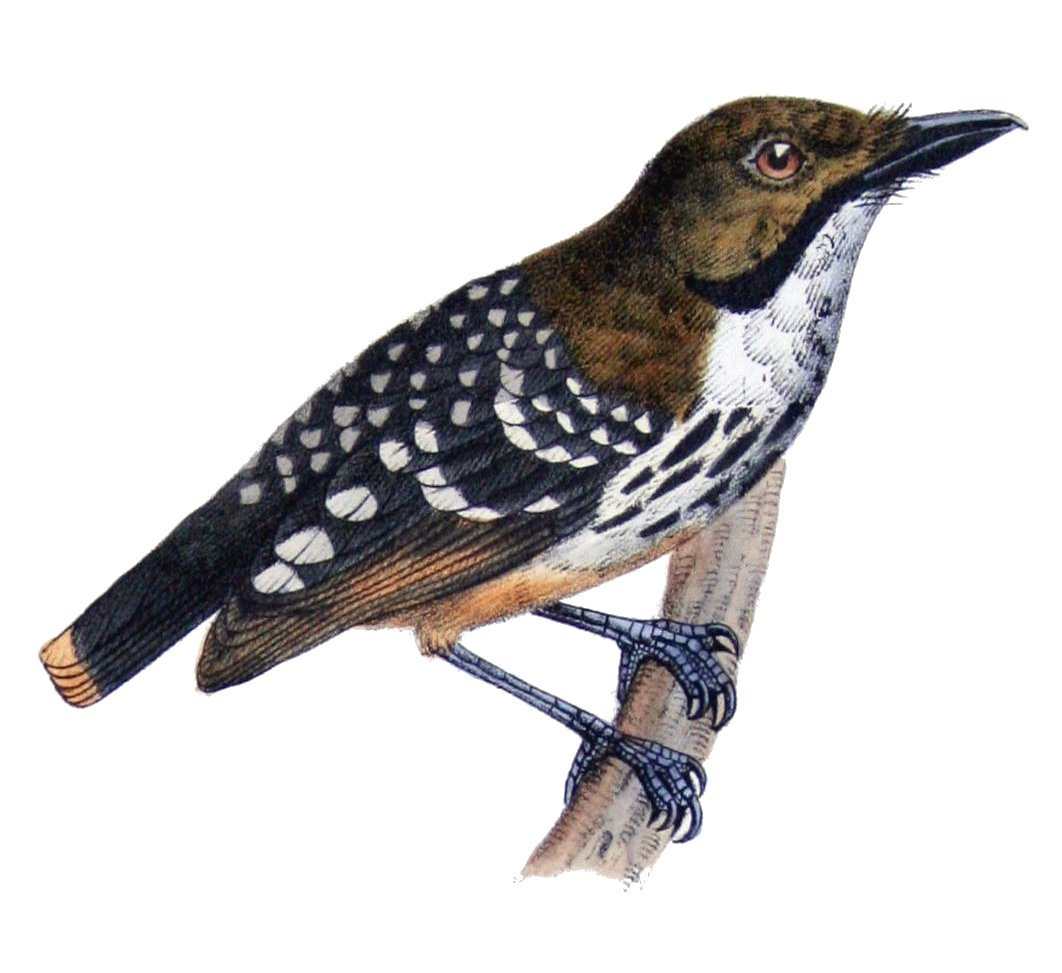
Illustration by Comte Francis de Castelnau, 1856

The dot-backed antbird is monotypic. It shares genus Hylophylax with the spotted antbird (H. naevioides) and spot-backed antbird (H. naevius). The population in central Brazil south of the Amazon is sometimes treated as subspecies H. p. subochraceous.

== Description ==
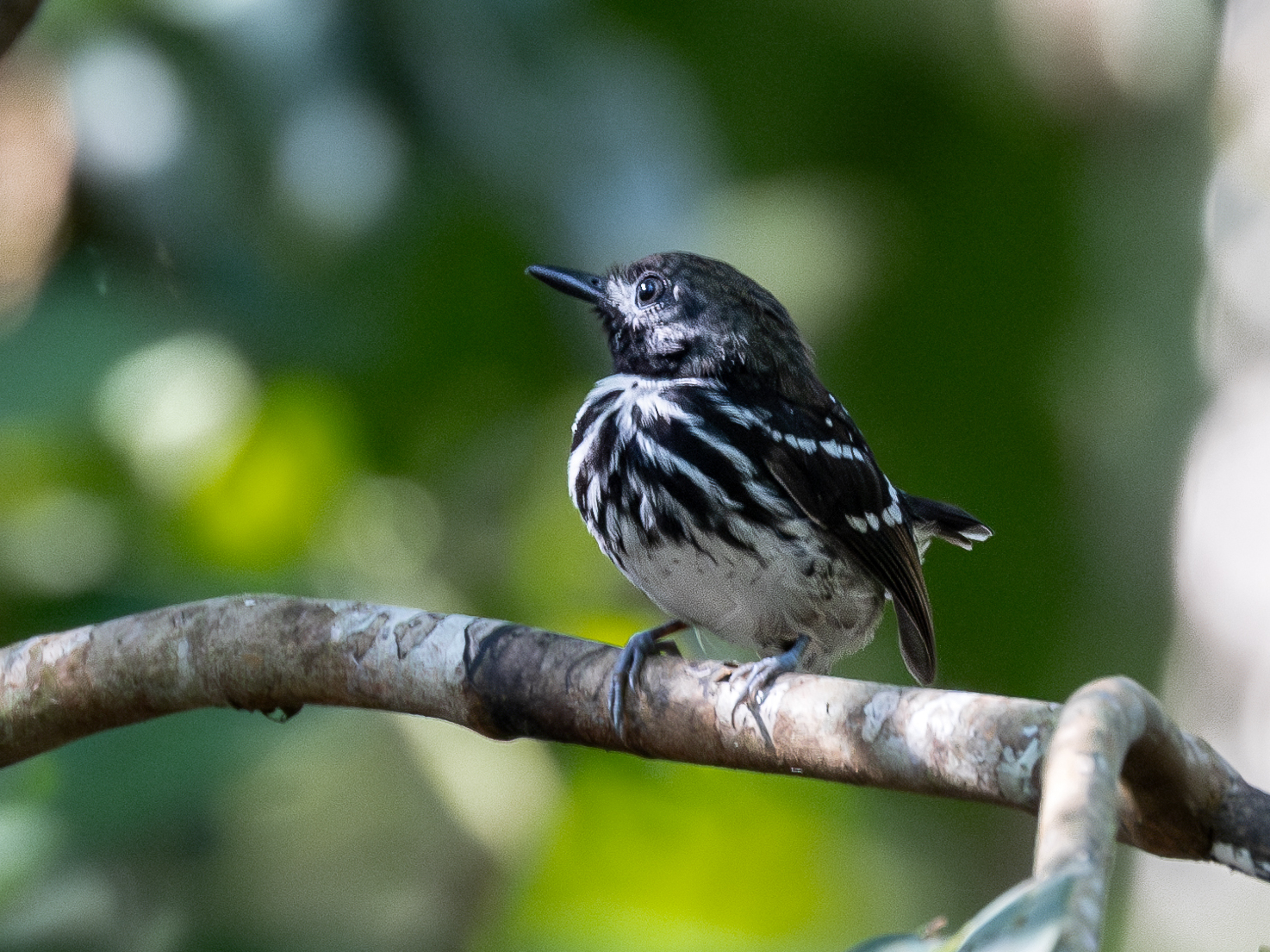
Male, Amazonas, Brazil

The dot-backed antbird is 10 to 11.5 cm (3.9 to 4.5 in) long and weighs 11 to 13 g (0.39 to 0.46 oz). Adult males have a dark rufous-brown crown, nape, and mantle with a white patch between their scapulars. Their back and rump are black with large white feather tips. Their flight feathers are dark brown with wide rufous-brown edges and their wing coverts black with wide white to pale buff tips. Their tail is black with white feather tips. Their face is mostly white; their throat and the lower sides of their neck are black. Their underparts are mostly white with heavy black spots across the breast and along the sides. Their lower belly and undertail coverts have a buffy-olive tinge. "H. p. subochraceous" has more yellow-brown upperparts and a more ochraceous belly, though these colors are at the end of a range rather than completed distinct. Adult females are overall paler than males, with pale buff wing covert tips, a white throat with a black line above it, and a buffy belly.

== Distribution and habitat ==
The dot-backed antbird is found in southern Venezuela, southern and far eastern Colombia, eastern Ecuador, northeastern and southeastern Peru, northern and eastern Bolivia, and western and southern Amazonian Brazil. Though some sources also place it in Guyana or French Guiana, the South American Classification Committee of the American Ornithological Society and the Clements taxonomy do not recognized any records in those countries.

The dot-backed antbird inhabits the understorey of lowland evergreen forest, primarily blackwater várzea forest and also swampy areas, the edges of oxbow lakes, and in transitional forest along small watercourses. In elevation it reaches 300 m (1,000 ft) in Venezuela, Colombia, and Ecuador.

== Behavior ==
=== Movement ===
The dot-backed antbird is believed to be a year-round resident throughout its range.

=== Feeding ===
The dot-backed antbird feeds primarily on a variety insects and probably also spiders. They forage as individuals, pairs, and small family groups and mostly within about 4 m (13 ft) of the ground and seldom with mixed-species feeding flocks. They hop among branches, typically in semi-open parts of the understorey, and take prey with sallies from a perch to the ground and by gleaning and lunging for prey on leaves, twigs, and branches. They occasionally attend army ant swarms as the ants traverse their territory.

=== Breeding ===
The dot-backed antbird's breeding season has not been determined though it includes August and January in parts of Brazil. Nothing else is known about the species' breeding biology.

=== Vocalization ===
The male dot-backed antbird's song is "a series of doublets each about 0·5 seconds long of 2 somewhat similar sharp whistles, the first emphasizing an upslur and the second a downslur, sounding like "free beer", delivered at rate of c. 1 every 2 seconds, sometimes for minutes at a time, doublet often given singly". Its note has also been written as "whee-beéyur" and "wee-HEEew". Its calls include "sharp 'psit' notes" in series, "a long downslurred whistle", and "variable chattering notes".

== Status ==
The IUCN has assessed the dot-backed antbird as being of Least Concern. It has a very large range; its population size is not known and is believed to be decreasing. No immediate threats have been identified. It is considered uncommon to locally fairly common and patchily distributed in most of its range. It occurs in some protected areas. "More surveys are needed in order to clarify the distribution of this poorly known and perhaps under-recorded species."
