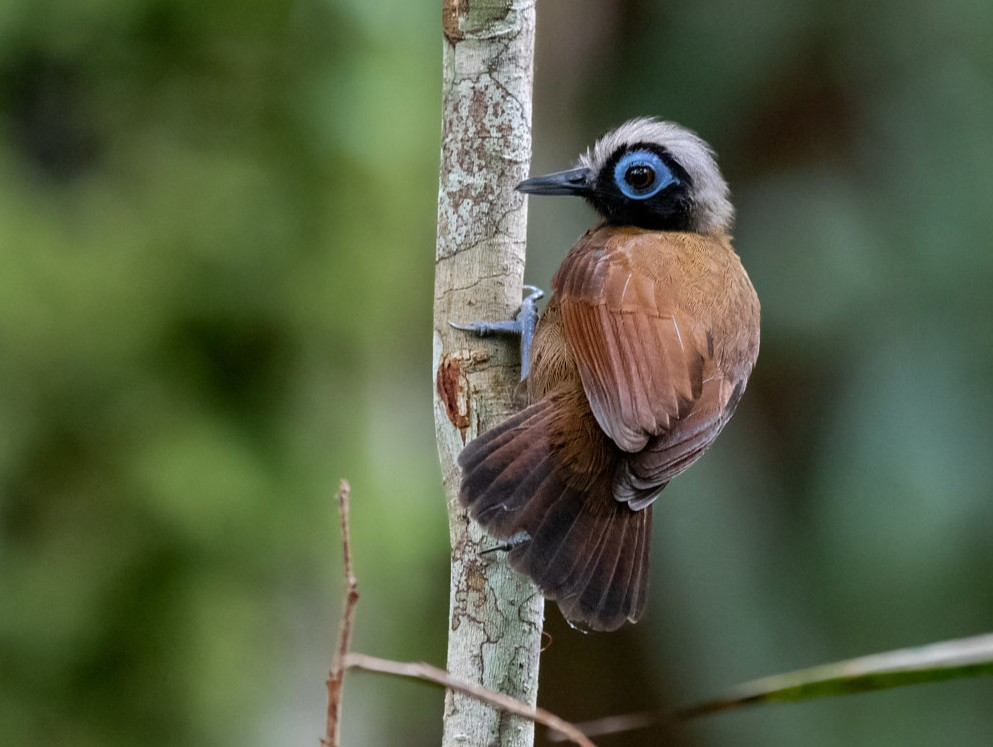

Conservation status
- Least Concern (IUCN 3.1)

Scientific classification
- Kingdom: Animalia
- Phylum: Chordata
- Class: Aves
- Order: Passeriformes
- Family: Thamnophilidae
- Genus: Rhegmatorhina
- Species: R. melanosticta

Binomial name
- Rhegmatorhina melanosticta (Sclater, PL & Salvin, 1880)

= Hairy-crested antbird =

Species of bird

The hairy-crested antbird (Rhegmatorhina melanosticta) is a species of bird in subfamily Thamnophilinae of family Thamnophilidae, the "typical antbirds". It is found in Bolivia, Brazil, Colombia, Ecuador, and Peru.

== Taxonomy and systematics ==
The hairy-crested antbird was described by the English ornithologists Philip Sclater and Osbert Salvin in 1880 and given the binomial name Pithys melanosticta. The present genus Rhegmatorhina was introduced by the American ornithologist Robert Ridgway in 1888. The specific epithet melanosticta is from the Ancient Greek melanostiktos meaning "black-spotted". It combines melas meaning "black" and stiktos meaning "spotted". The five members of genus Rhegmatorhina are sisters to the three species of genus Gymnopithys.

The hairy-crested antbird's taxonomy is unsettled. The International Ornithological Committee assigns it these four subspecies:

- R. m. melanosticta (Sclater, PL & Salvin, 1880)
- R. m. brunneiceps Chapman, 1928
- R. m. purusiana (Snethlage, E, 1908)
- R. m. badia Zimmer, JT, 1932

The Clements taxonomy and BirdLife International's Handbook of the Birds of the World include R. m. badia within R. m. purusiana. Some taxonomists have suggested that more than one species is present, and specifically that R. m. brunneiceps should be treated as a separate species.

This article follows the four-subspecies model.

== Description ==
The hairy-crested antbird is 14 to 15 cm (5.5 to 5.9 in) long and weighs 29 to 33 g (1.0 to 1.2 oz). Both sexes have a large pale bluish white ring of bare skin around the eye, and adults have a bushy crest. Adult males of the nominate subspecies R. m. melanosticta have an olive-tinged gray crest. Their nape, the sides of their neck, and their upperparts, wings, and tail are olive-brown. The wing feathers have rufous edges and the tail is blackish towards its tip. Their lores, face, and throat are black and the rest of their underparts dark olive-brown. Adult females are like males with the addition of short black bars with cinnamon-rufous edges on their upper back feathers and wing coverts. Subadult males do not have a crest; their crown is blackish, their upperparts like adult females', and their underparts have some blackish feathers. Subspecies R. m. brunneiceps is more rufescent than the nominate, with a black-streaked rufous to light brown crown and darker underparts. R. m. purusiana and R. m. badia are somewhat variable but paler than the nominate, and females have smaller black bars on their back.

== Distribution and habitat ==
The subspecies of the hairy-crested antbird are found thus:

- R. m. melanosticta: from Meta Department in south-central Colombia south through eastern Ecuador into northeastern Peru north of the Amazon
- R. m. brunneiceps: eastern Peru south of the Marañón River and west of the Ucayali River between the departments of San Martín and Ayacucho
- R. m. purusiana: eastern Peru south of the Amazon and east of the Ucayali and western Amazonian Brazil to the Madeira River
- R. m. badia: southeastern Peru, northwestern Bolivia, and southwestern Amazonian Brazil

The hairy-crested antbird primarily inhabits the understorey of humid terra firme evergreen forest though it also occurs in transitional forest between it and seasonally flooded areas. In elevation it reaches 1,000 m (3,300 ft) in Colombia, 750 m (2,500 ft) in Ecuador, and 1,350 m (4,400 ft) in Peru.

== Behavior ==
=== Movement ===
The hairy-crested antbird is believed to be a year-round resident.

=== Feeding ===
The hairy-crested antbird is an obligate ant follower that feeds on a variety of arthropods that flee foraging army ant swarms, such as those of Eciton burchelli. It typically forages individually, in pairs, and in family groups, perching within about 1 m (3 ft) of the ground and sallying or pouncing to the ground after prey. Several family groups may attend an ant swarm. It is dominant over smaller antbirds but subordinate to larger antbirds and species of other families such as woodcreepers.

=== Breeding ===
The hairy-crested antbird's breeding season in Peru spans at least September to December; its breeding season elsewhere is not known. Five nests discovered in Peru were cups or shallow beds, mostly made of strips of palm frond, and variably placed atop a stump or in a cavity. The usual clutch size is two pinkish eggs with brown to maroon spots and streaks. The one known period from hatch to fledging was 14 days. The incubation period and details of parental care are not known.

=== Vocalization ===
One author described the hairy-crested antbird's song as a "slow series, starting with a few very high, sharp, fluted notes, then descending to a few drawn-out, grating notes". Others describe it as "a short series of wheezy, somewhat nasal whistled notes, e.g., 'wheeeyr, wheer-wheer-wheer-wheer' with descending effect". Its calls include a "harsh, vibrant 'chirr' [and an] abrupt 'chip' ".

== Status ==
The IUCN has assessed the hairy-crested antbird as being of Least Concern. It has a very large range; its population size is not known and is believed to be decreasing. No immediate threats have been identified. It is generally considered uncommon though "rare to uncommon" in Peru, "scarce" in Ecuador, and "rarely encountered" in Colombia. It occurs in several large governmentally protected areas and in private preserves and "[e]xtensive unprotected intact habitat also exists throughout the range".
