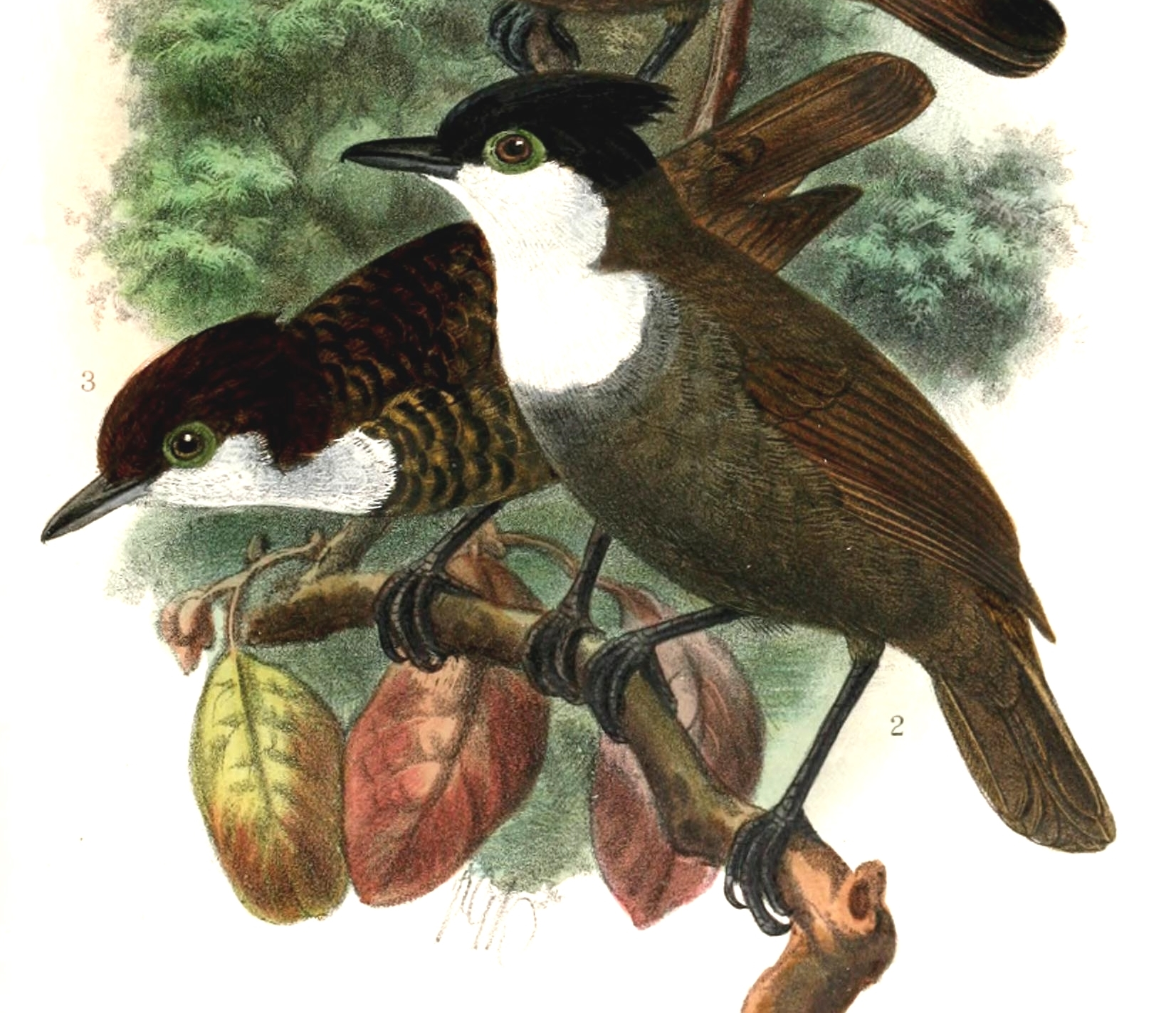

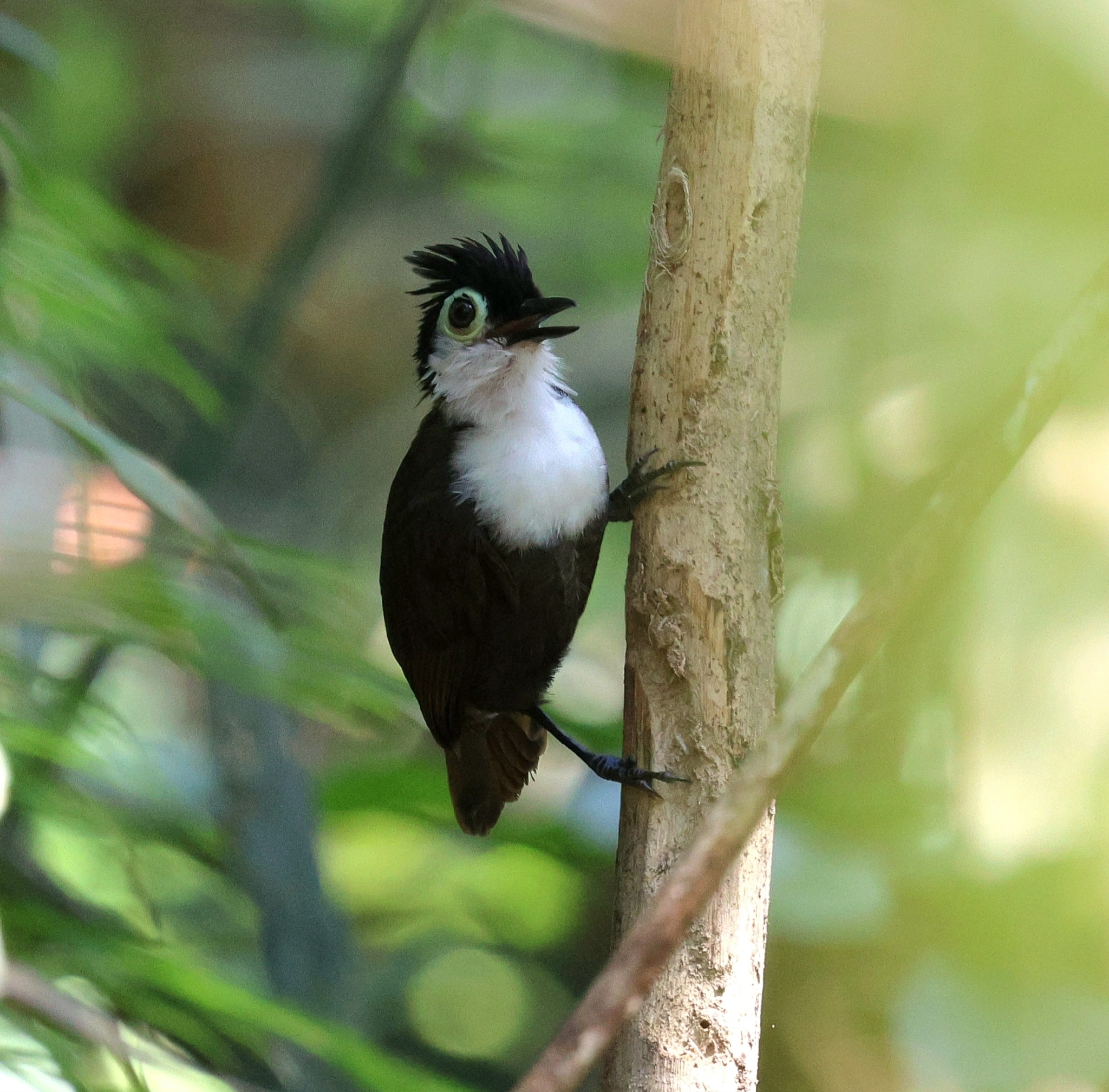

Conservation status
- Least Concern (IUCN 3.1)

Scientific classification
- Kingdom: Animalia
- Phylum: Chordata
- Class: Aves
- Order: Passeriformes
- Family: Thamnophilidae
- Genus: Rhegmatorhina
- Species: R. hoffmannsi

Binomial name
- Rhegmatorhina hoffmannsi (Hellmayr, 1907)

= White-breasted antbird =

Species of bird

The white-breasted antbird (Rhegmatorhina hoffmannsi) is a species of bird in subfamily Thamnophilinae of family Thamnophilidae, the "typical antbirds". It is endemic to Brazil.

== Taxonomy and systematics ==
The five members of genus Rhegmatorhina are sisters to the three species of genus Gymnopithys. The white-breasted antbird frequently hybridizes with the congeneric harlequin antbird (R. berlepschi). The white-breasted antbird is monotypic.

== Description ==
The white-breasted antbird is 14 to 15 cm (5.5 to 5.9 in) long and weighs 28 to 34 g (0.99 to 1.2 oz). Both sexes have a crest and a pale greenish yellow ring of bare skin around the eye. Adult males have a black forehead, crown, and nape. Their upperparts, wings, and tail are olive-brown with rufous edges on the wing feathers. Their face, throat, and breast are white and the rest of their underparts olive-gray. Adult females have a similar pattern to males but with black-streaked chestnut on the crown, a rufous-chestnut nape, and buff-edged black tips on the feathers of their upperparts, wing coverts, and belly.

== Distribution and habitat ==
The white-breasted antbird is found in central Amazonian Brazil from the east bank of the lower Rio Madeira in Amazonas south through Rondônia into western Mato Grosso. It primarily inhabits the understorey of humid terra firme evergreen forest though it also occurs in transitional forest between it and seasonally flooded areas. Its range is entirely below 300 m (1,000 ft) of elevation.

== Behavior ==
=== Movement ===
The white-breasted antbird is believed to be a year-round resident.

=== Feeding ===
The white-breasted antbird is an obligate ant follower that feeds on a variety of arthropods that flee foraging army ant swarms, such as those of Eciton burchelli. It typically forages individually, in pairs, and in family groups, perching within about 1 m (3 ft) of the ground and sallying or pouncing to the ground after prey. Several family groups may attend an ant swarm. It is dominant over smaller antbirds but subordinate to larger antbirds and species of other families such as woodcreepers.

=== Breeding ===
The white-breasted antbird is believed to breed in the rainy season, perhaps beginning in December or January. Nothing else is known about the species' breeding biology.

=== Vocalization ===
The white-breasted antbird's song "begins with long, slurred whistle, followed by 6–7 shorter whistles that become more downslurred, ending with 2–4 burry notes at lower pitch"; the final notes are sometimes omitted. Its calls include a "harsh, vibrant 'chirr' [and an] abrupt 'chip' ".

== Status ==
The IUCN originally in 1988 assessed the white-breasted antbird as Threatened, then in 2004 as of Least Concern, in 2012 as Near Threatened, and in 2021 again as of Least Concern. It has a large range; its population size is not known and is believed to be decreasing. "The species is highly sensitive to human disturbance and is suffering from widespread deforestation, particularly in Mato Grosso and Rondônia, which has increased markedly since the 1960s owing to road building, ranching, agriculture, commercial logging, mining and hydroelectric development." It is poorly known but considered locally fairly common. It does occur in a few private and federally protected areas.
