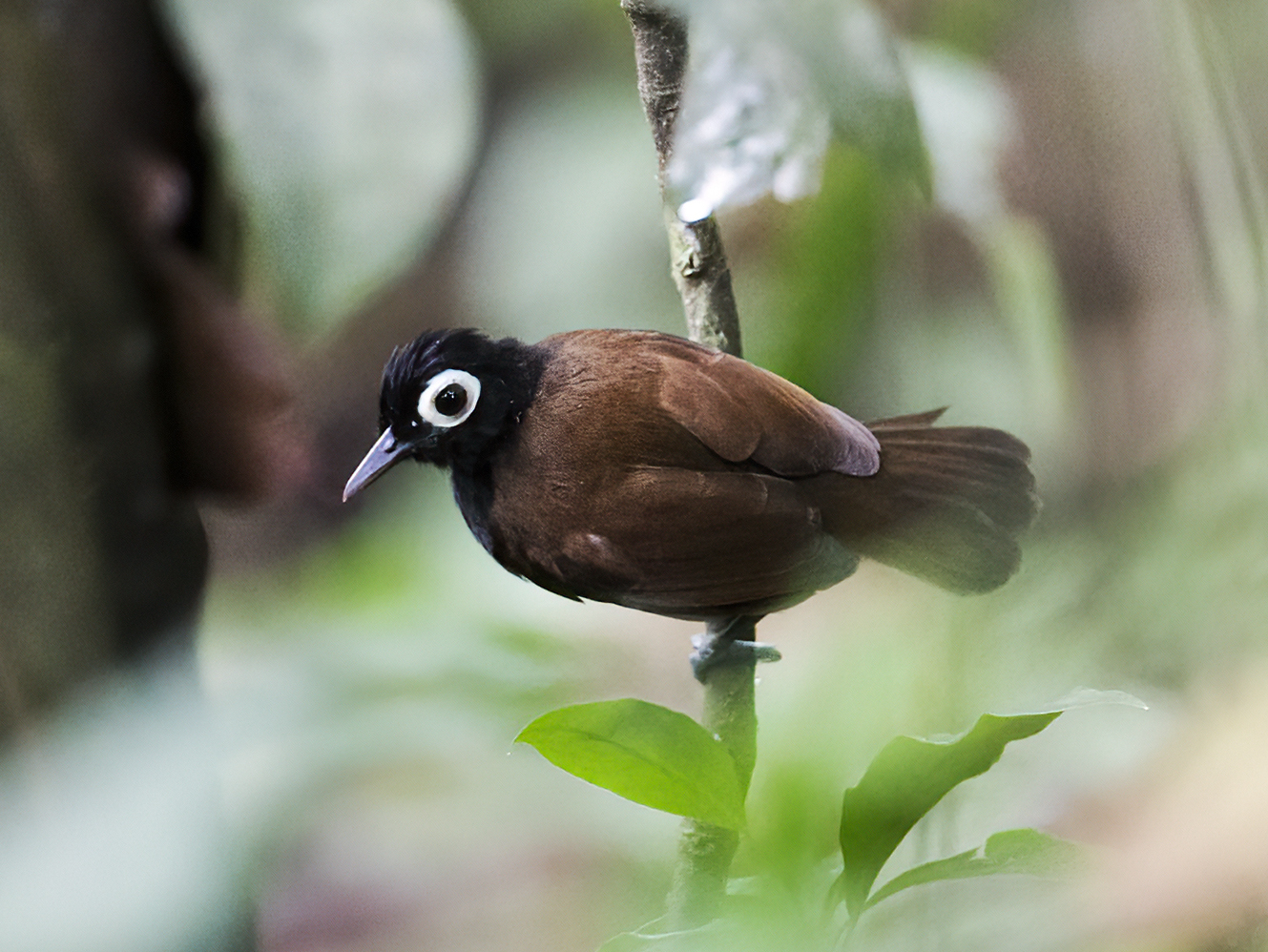

Conservation status
- Vulnerable (IUCN 3.1)

Scientific classification
- Kingdom: Animalia
- Phylum: Chordata
- Class: Aves
- Order: Passeriformes
- Family: Thamnophilidae
- Genus: Rhegmatorhina
- Species: R. gymnops

Binomial name
- Rhegmatorhina gymnops Ridgway, 1888

= Bare-eyed antbird =

Species of bird

The bare-eyed antbird (Rhegmatorhina gymnops), occasionally known as the Santarem antbird, is a Vulnerable species of insectivorous passerine bird in subfamily Thamnophilinae of family Thamnophilidae, the "typical antbirds". It is endemic to Brazil.

== Taxonomy and systematics ==
The bare-eyed antbird was formally described by the American ornithologist Robert Ridgway in 1888 and given the binomial name Rhegmatorhina gymnops. The five members of genus Rhegmatorhina are sisters to the three species of genus Gymnopithys. The bare-eyed antbird is monotypic.

== Description ==
The bare-eyed antbird is 13.5 to 14.5 cm (5.3 to 5.7 in) long and weighs about 27 to 30 g (0.95 to 1.1 oz). Both sexes have a crest and a pale grayish green ring of bare skin around the eye. Adult males have a blackish gray head and upper breast. Their upperparts and tail are dark reddish yellow-brown and their wings a brighter rufous. Their belly and vent area are dark grayish brown with somewhat browner flanks. Adult females have a brownish black head and throat. Their upperparts, wings, and tail are the same as the male's. Their underparts are dark yellowish brown. Juvenile males resemble adult males but are browner; juveniles of both sexes have a rufous tinge to their dark brown feathers. All ages and sexes have a dark brown iris and darkish gray legs and feet. Adults have a dark bill and juveniles have a dark maxilla and a pale mandible.

== Distribution and habitat ==
The bare-eyed antbird has a limited range in southeastern Amazonian Brazil. It is bounded by the Amazon on the north, the Rio Tapajós on the west, and the Rio Xingu on the east. Its southern border is not well known but extends at least to the Teles Pires in northern Mato Grosso state. The species almost entirely inhabits the understorey of very humid terra firme primary rainforest, though it has also been recorded in várzea. Its range is entirely below 400 m (1,300 ft) of elevation.

== Behavior ==
=== Movement ===
The bare-eyed antbird is not known to migrate.

=== Feeding ===
The bare-eyed antbird is an obligate ant follower that feeds on a variety of arthropods that flee foraging army ant swarms, such as those of Eciton burchelli and genus Labidus. It typically forages individually, in pairs, and in family groups, perching within about 1 m (3 ft) of the ground and sallying or pouncing to the ground after prey. Several family groups may attend an ant swarm. It is dominant over smaller antbirds but subordinate to larger species of other families such as woodcreepers.

=== Breeding ===
The bare-eyed antbird apparently breeds in the rainy season between November and February. Nothing else is known about the species' breeding biology.

=== Vocalization ===
The bare-eyed antbird's song is "4-5 very high, descending notes, each one drawn out" and written as "Heeeeee, hew-hew-hew-hew!". Its calls include "a harsh, vibrant chirr... abrupt chip notes [and] a thin teeeeeee whistle".

== Status ==
The IUCN originally in 1988 assessed the bare-eyed antbird as Near Threatened, then in 2004 as of Least Concern, and since 2012 as Vulnerable. It has a limited range; its population size is not known and is believed to be decreasing. "The species is suffering from widespread deforestation in Pará and Mato Grosso, which has increased markedly since the 1960s due to road building, ranching, smallholder agriculture, mining and hydroelectric development." "This species has been found to be extremely sensitive to forest fragmentation, a result of its dependence on the area-sensitive army ants" though it will sometimes cross rivers and narrow road breaks in continuous forest.
