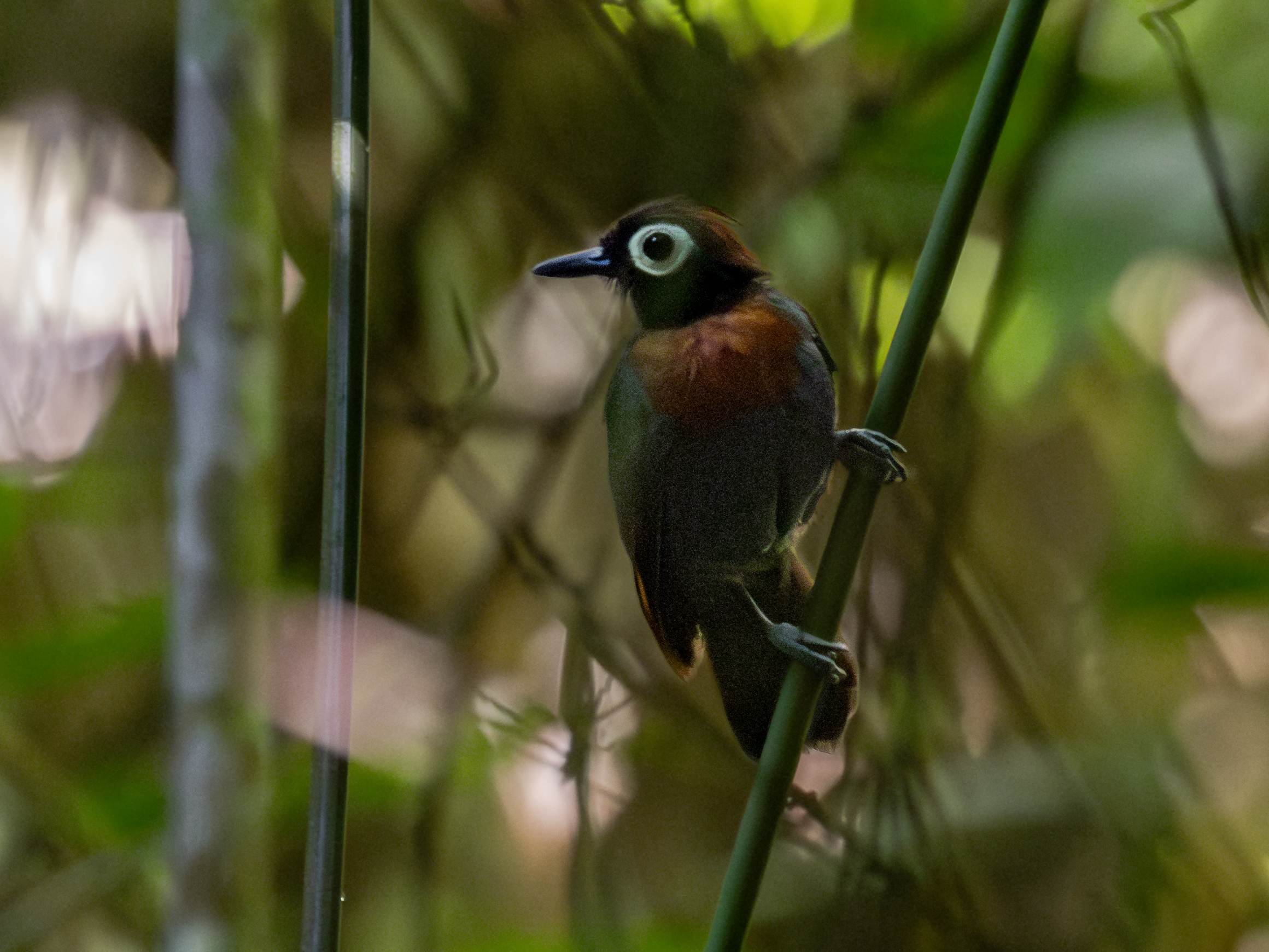
- Male
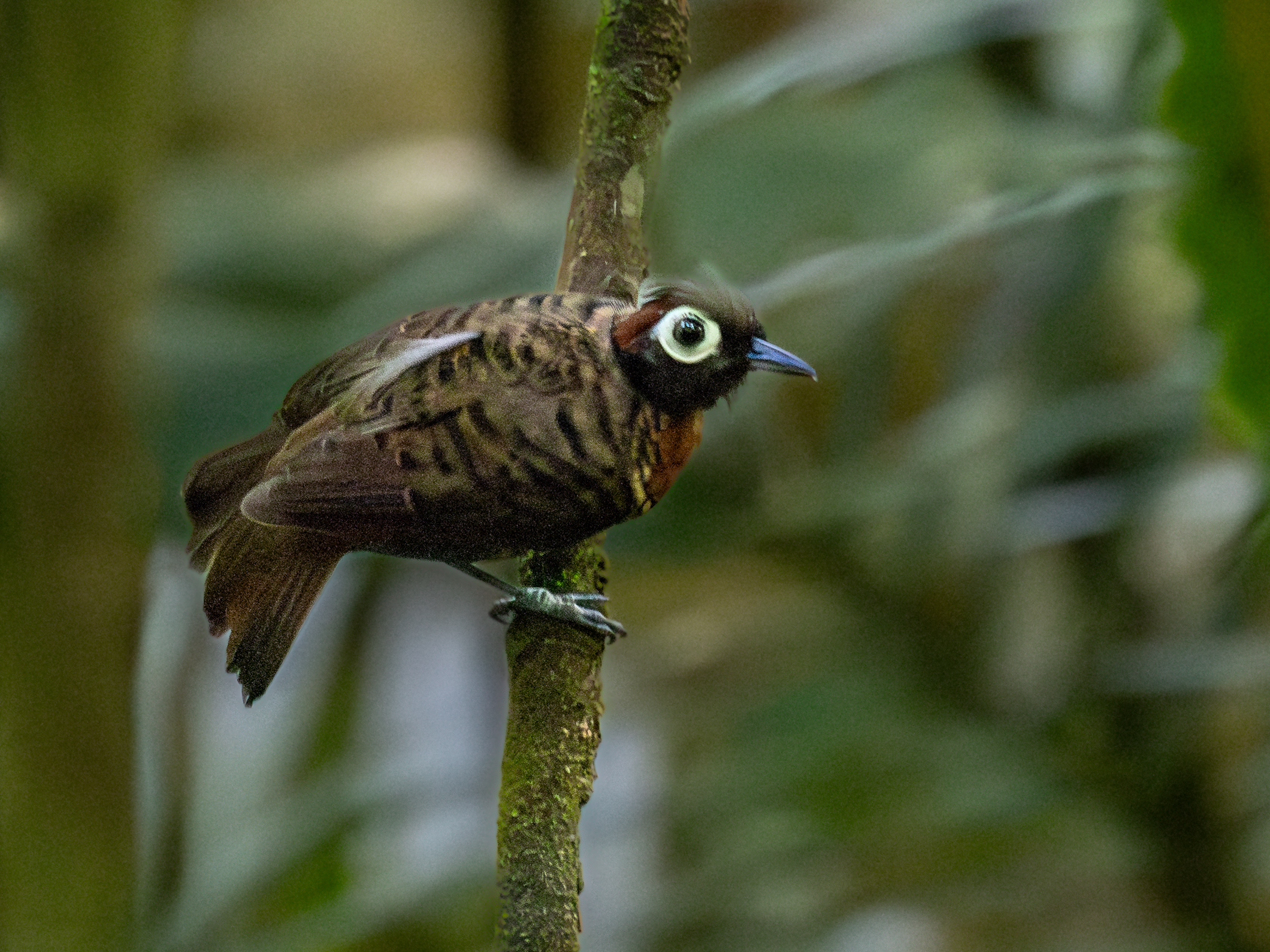
- Female (Amazonia National Park)

Conservation status
- Least Concern (IUCN 3.1)

Scientific classification
- Kingdom: Animalia
- Phylum: Chordata
- Class: Aves
- Order: Passeriformes
- Family: Thamnophilidae
- Genus: Rhegmatorhina
- Species: R. berlepschi

Binomial name
- Rhegmatorhina berlepschi (Snethlage, 1907)

= Harlequin antbird =

Species of bird in Brazil

The harlequin antbird (Rhegmatorhina berlepschi) is a species of bird in subfamily Thamnophilinae of family Thamnophilidae, the "typical antbirds". It is endemic to Brazil.

== Taxonomy and systematics ==
The five members of genus Rhegmatorhina are sisters to the three species of genus Gymnopithys. The harlequin antbird frequently hybridizes with the congeneric white-breasted antbird (R. hoffmannsi). The harlequin antbird is monotypic.

== Description ==
The harlequin antbird is 14 to 15 cm (5.5 to 5.9 in) long. Both sexes have a small crest and a pale grayish green ring of bare skin around the eye. Adult males have a dark brownish crown; their crest and nape are rufous-chestnut. Their upperparts, wings, and tail are olive-brown with rufous edges on the wing feathers. Their face and throat are black and their breast's center rufous-chestnut. The sides of their neck and the rest of their underparts are gray with an olive-brown tinge on the flanks. Adult females are similar to males with the addition of buff-edged black tips on their upperpart feathers and wing coverts and black and pale buff banding on their sides and lower breast.

== Distribution and habitat ==
The harlequin antbird has a very limited range in Amazonian Brazil. It is bounded by the Amazon on the north, the Rio Madeira on the west, and the Rio Tapajós on the east. Its southern limit is indistinct. The species inhabits the understorey of humid terra firme evergreen forest. Its range is entirely below 100 m (300 ft) of elevation.

== Behavior ==
=== Movement ===
The harlequin antbird is a year-round resident.

=== Feeding ===
The harlequin antbird is an obligate ant follower that feeds on a variety of arthropods that flee foraging army ant swarms, such as those of Eciton burchelli. It typically forages individually, in pairs, and in family groups, perching within about 1 m (3 ft) of the ground and sallying or pouncing to the ground after prey. Several family groups may attend an ant swarm. It is dominant over smaller antbirds but subordinate to larger antbirds and species of other families such as woodcreepers.

=== Breeding ===
The harlequin antbird is believed to breed late in the rainy season, perhaps beginning in December. Nothing else is known about the species' breeding biology.

=== Vocalization ===
The harlequin antbird's song is a "very high, slightly descending series of loud, sharp notes, the 1st drawn out, the rest becoming shorter". Its calls include a "harsh, vibrant 'chirr' [and an] abrupt 'chip' ".

== Status ==
The IUCN has assessed the harlequin antbird as being of Least Concern. It has a limited range; its population size is not known and is believed to be decreasing. No immediate threats have been identified. It is considered uncommon and "considered to be of high sensitivity to human disturbance". Much of its range is within Tapajós National Park, which however is "highly threatened by gold-miners, by squatters and, probably most seriously, by hydro-electric development of Tapajós Basin".
