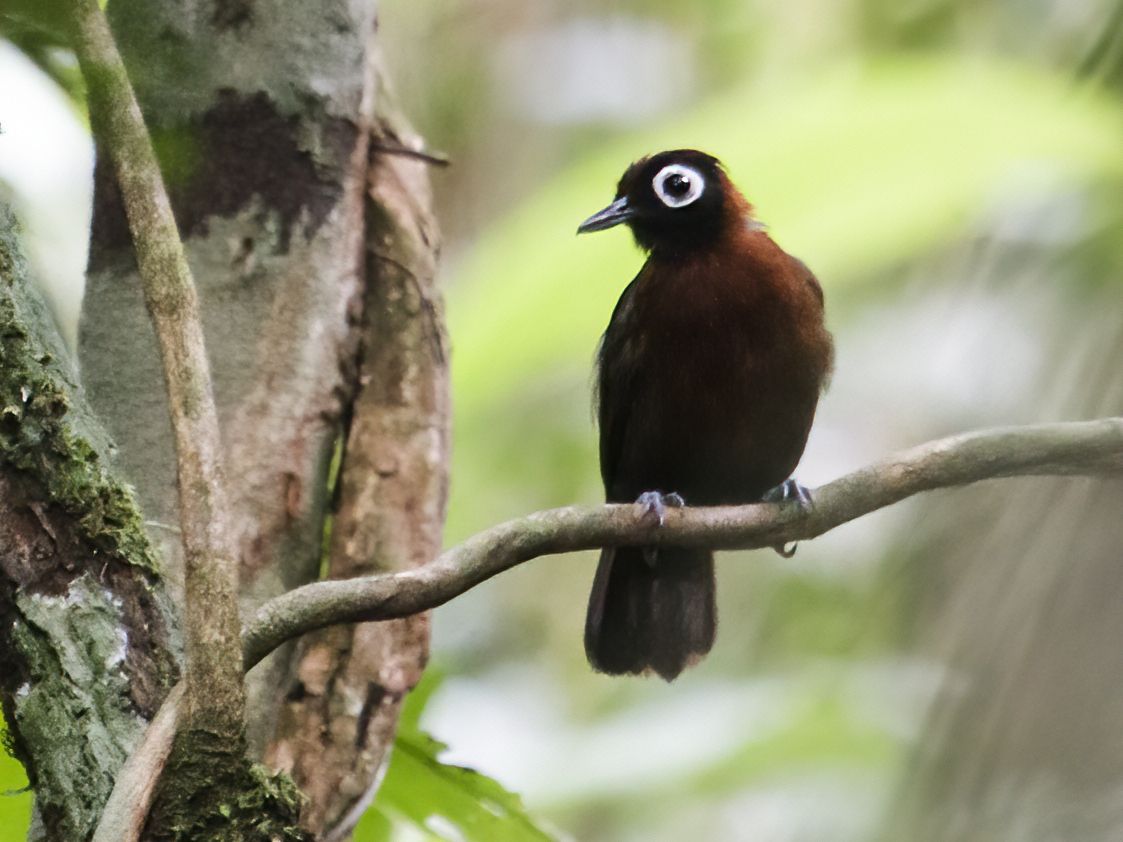

Conservation status
- Least Concern (IUCN 3.1)

Scientific classification
- Kingdom: Animalia
- Phylum: Chordata
- Class: Aves
- Order: Passeriformes
- Family: Thamnophilidae
- Genus: Rhegmatorhina
- Species: R. cristata

Binomial name
- Rhegmatorhina cristata (Pelzeln, 1868)

= Chestnut-crested antbird =

Species of bird

The chestnut-crested antbird (Rhegmatorhina cristata) is a species of bird in subfamily Thamnophilinae of family Thamnophilidae, the "typical antbirds". It is found in Brazil and Colombia.

== Taxonomy and systematics ==
The chestnut-crested antbird was described by the Austrian ornithologist August von Pelzeln in 1868 and given the binomial name Pithys cristata. The five members of genus Rhegmatorhina are sisters to the three species of genus Gymnopithys. The chestnut-crested antbird is monotypic.

== Description ==
The chestnut-crested antbird is 14 to 15 cm (5.5 to 5.9 in) long. Both sexes have a pale bluish white ring of bare skin around the eye. Adult males have a rufous-chestnut crown, crest, and nape. Their forehead, lores, face, and throat are black. Their upperparts, wings, and tail are dark olive-brown with rufous edges on the wing feathers. Their breast is rufous-chestnut that becomes dark olive-brown on their belly. Adult females are like males with the addition of short black bars on their back feathers and lesser coverts.

== Distribution and habitat ==
The chestnut-crested antbird is found from eastern Caquetá Department in Colombia east into western Brazil generally between the Vaupés, Negro, and Japurá rivers. It primarily inhabits the understorey of humid terra firme evergreen forest, especially that growing on sandy soils. Its range is entirely below 350 m (1,100 ft) of elevation.

== Behavior ==
=== Movement ===
The chestnut-crested antbird is believed to be a year-round resident.

=== Feeding ===
The chestnut-crested antbird is an obligate ant follower that feeds on a variety of arthropods that flee foraging army ant swarms, such as those of Eciton burchelli. It typically forages individually, in pairs, and in family groups, perching within about 1 m (3 ft) of the ground and sallying or pouncing to the ground after prey. Several family groups may attend an ant swarm. It is dominant over smaller antbirds but subordinate to larger antbirds and species of other families such as woodcreepers.

=== Breeding ===
The chestnut-crested antbird's breeding season appears to include May to at least July. Nothing else is known about the species' breeding biology.

=== Vocalization ===
The chestnut-crested antbird's song is a "slow, slightly accelerating series of 8-10 fluted notes, the 1st slightly lower, the following higher and drawn out, then calmly descending". Its calls include a "harsh, vibrant 'chirr' [and an] abrupt 'chip' ".

== Status ==
The IUCN has assessed the chestnut-crested antbird as being of Least Concern. Its population size is not known and is believed to be stable. No immediate threats have been identified. It is considered uncommon to locally fairly common and its small range is "currently under relatively little development pressure".
