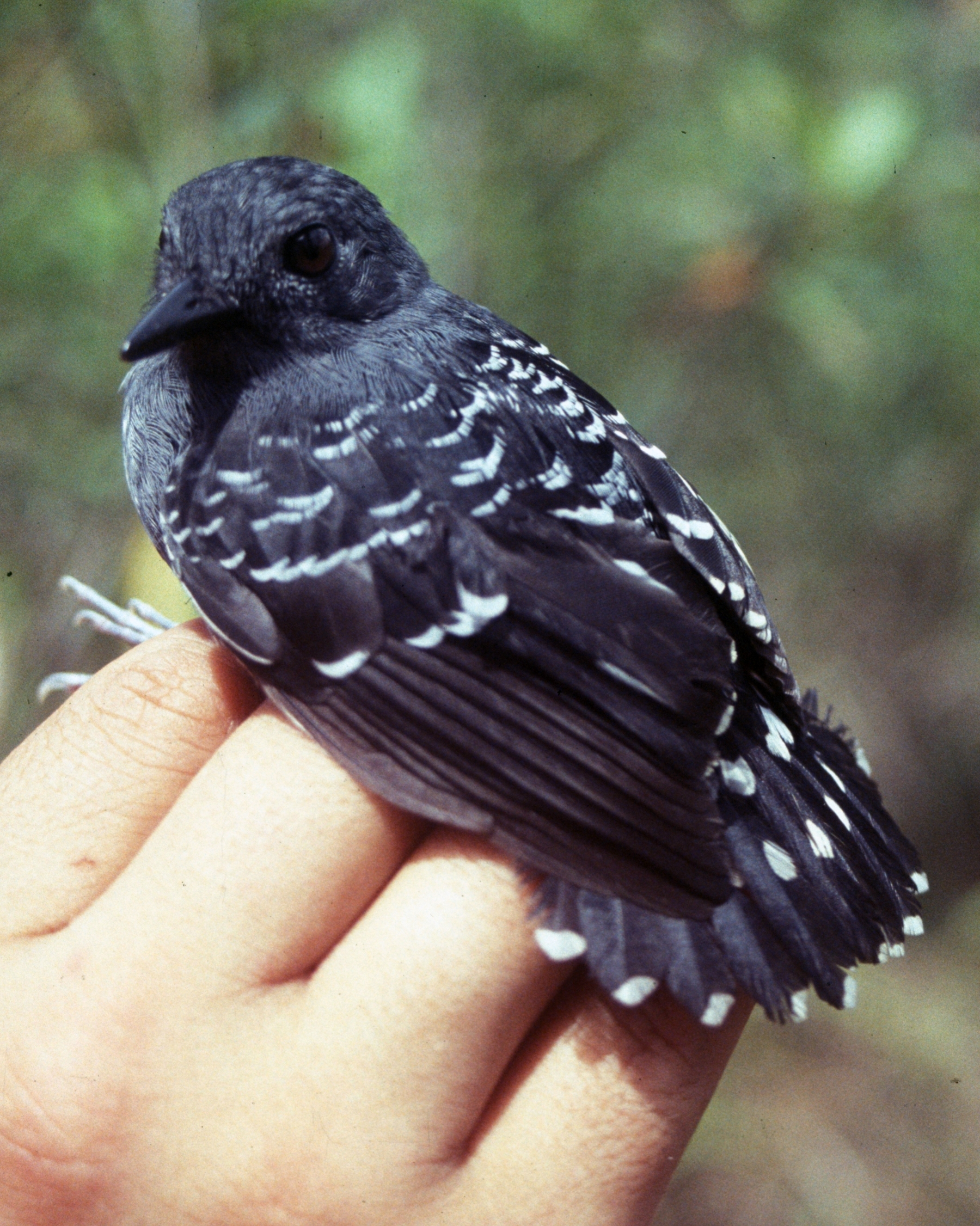
- Male common scale-backed antbird (Willisornis poecilonotus)

Scientific classification
- Kingdom: Animalia
- Phylum: Chordata
- Class: Aves
- Order: Passeriformes
- Family: Thamnophilidae
- Genus: Willisornis; Agne & Pacheco, 2007

Type species
- Hypocnemis poecilinota Cabanis, 1847

= Willisornis =

Genus of birds

Willisornis is a genus of insectivorous passerine birds in the antbird family, Thamnophilidae. These small, strongly sexually dichromatic birds are native to the Guianas and Amazon rainforest in South America, and often follow army ants.

== Taxonomy ==
The genus Willisornis was erected by the Brazilian ornithologists Carlos Agne and José Fernando Pacheco in 2007. The genus is named after the American ornithologist Edwin O'Neill Willis. The common scale-backed antbird had traditionally been included in the genus Hylophylax, but is now known to belong to a different clade. The name Dichropogon was used briefly instead, but this name is preoccupied by a genus of asilid flies (Dichropogon Bezzi, 1910).

The two species are:

- Common scale-backed antbird (Willisornis poecilonotus)
- Xingu scale-backed antbird (Willisornis vidua)

The two species were previously considered conspecific. They were split based on the differences in their vocalization.
