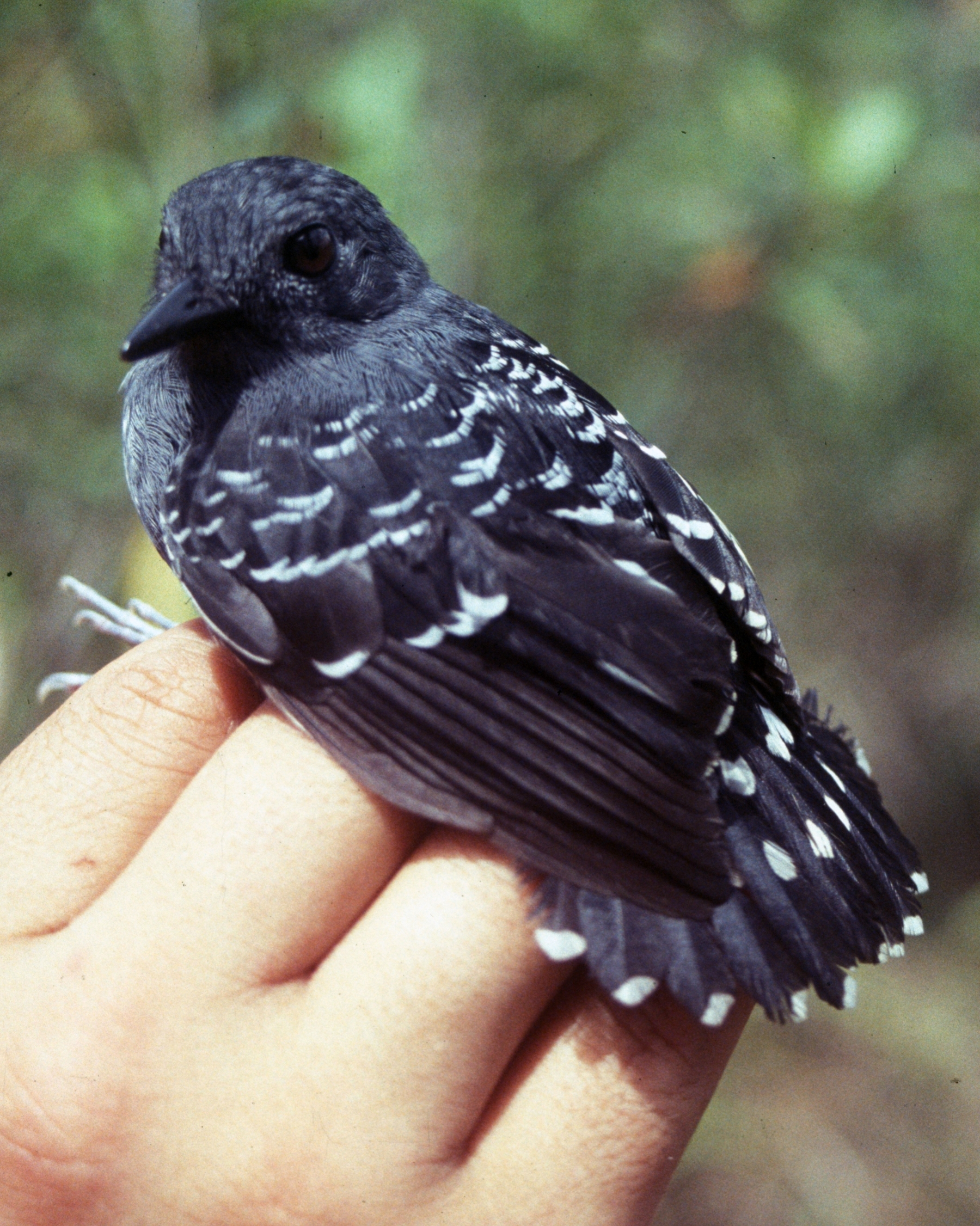
- Male, Cordillera del Cóndor, Ecuador
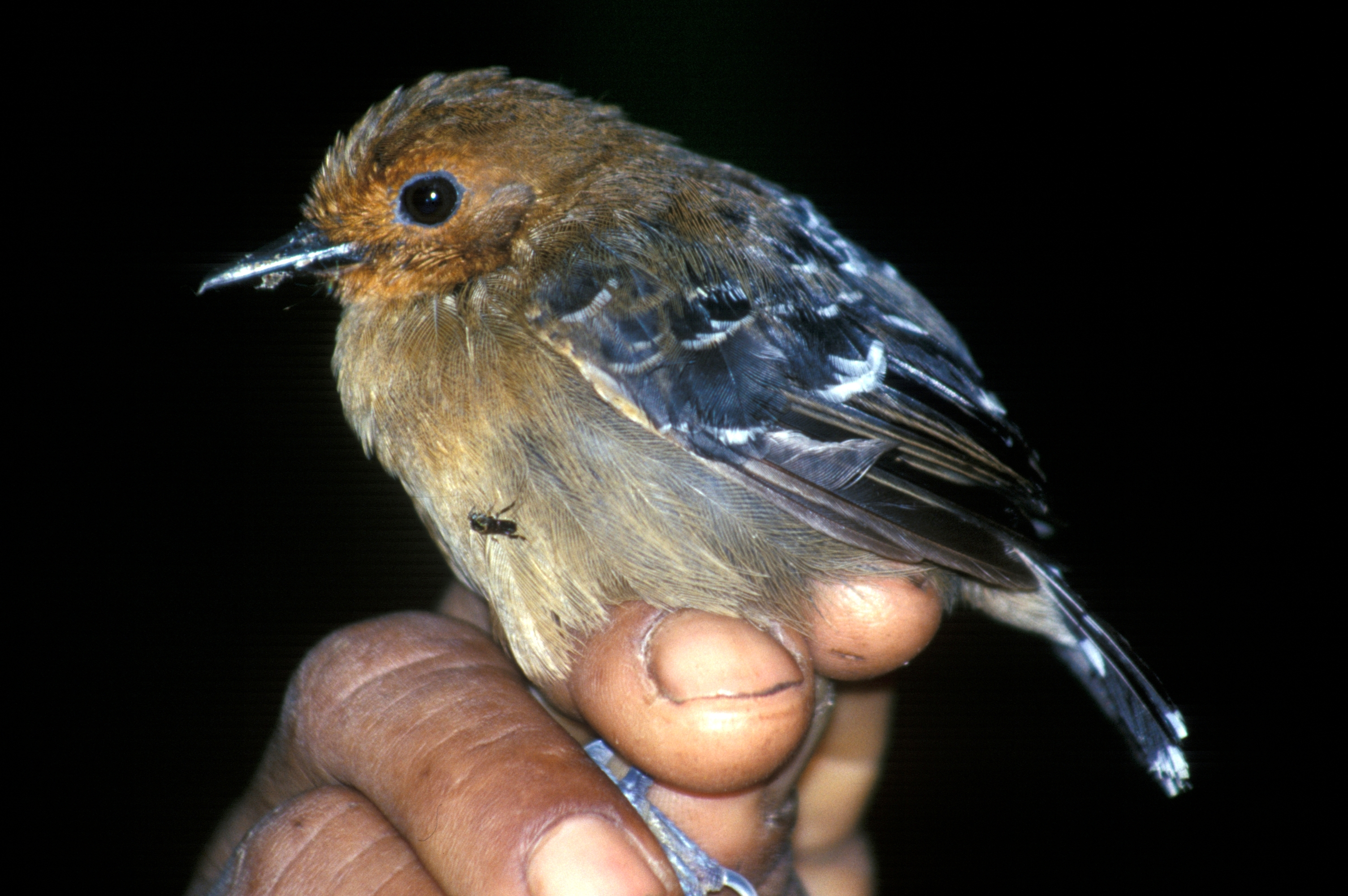
- Female, Cordillera del Cóndor, Ecuador

Conservation status
- Least Concern (IUCN 3.1)

Scientific classification
- Kingdom: Animalia
- Phylum: Chordata
- Class: Aves
- Order: Passeriformes
- Family: Thamnophilidae
- Genus: Willisornis
- Species: W. poecilinotus

Binomial name
- Willisornis poecilinotus (Cabanis, 1847)

Synonyms
- Hylophylax poecilonota; Dichropogon poecilonota; Hypocnemis lepidonota

= Common scale-backed antbird =

Species of bird

The common scale-backed antbird (Willisornis poecilinotus) is a species of passerine bird in subfamily Thamnophilinae of family Thamnophilidae, the "typical antbirds". It is found in Bolivia, Brazil, Colombia, Ecuador, French Guiana, Guyana, Peru, Suriname, and Venezuela.

== Taxonomy and systematics ==
The common scale-backed antbird has a complicated taxonomic history. It was described and illustrated by the German ornithologist Jean Cabanis in 1847 and given the binomial name Hypocnemis poecilinotus. The specific epithet is from the Ancient Greek poikilonōtos "with variegated back" (from poikilos "spotted" and nōton "back"). It was subsequently included in the genus Hylophylax, but was found to not be closely related to the other species in the genus and then was briefly placed in genus Dichropogon. This name is preoccupied by a genus of asilid flies (Dichropogon Bezzi, 1910) so the current genus Willisornis was created for it.

The common scale-backed antbird has these five subspecies:

- W. p. poecilinotus (Cabanis, 1847)
- W. p. duidae (Chapman, 1923)
- W. p. lepidonota (Sclater, PL & Salvin, 1880)
- W. p. griseiventris (Pelzeln, 1868)
- W. p. gutturalis (Todd, 1927)

The plumages of the subspecies differ greatly, leading to speculation that some of them should be recognized as full species. The South American Classification Committee of the American Ornithological Society is seeking a formal proposal to consider the issue.

What are now the two subspecies of the Xingu scale-backed antbird (W. vidua) were previously included in W. poecilinotus.

== Description ==
The common scale-backed antbird is 12 to 13 cm (4.7 to 5.1 in) long and weighs 15 to 22 g (0.53 to 0.78 oz). Adult males of the nominate subspecies W. p. poecilinotus are mostly gray; their upperparts are darker than their underparts. They have a white patch between the scapulars. Their lower back has white-edged black patches that give it its English name. Their wings and tail are black with white edges and tips on many feathers. Adult females have a reddish yellow-brown crown and face. Their upperparts are mostly olive-brown with buff-edged brownish black patches on the lower back. They also have a white patch between the scapulars. Their flight feathers are blackish brown with reddish brown edges and their tail is dark olive-brown with white spots and a blackish band near the end. Their throat is pale grayish white. Their underparts are gray with a reddish yellow-brown tinge on the flanks.

Females of subspecies W. p. duidae have a black lower back and rump with wide white feather edges, a white-spotted black tail, reddish yellow-brown underparts with a cinnamon-rufous center to the belly, and olive-brown tinged flanks. Females of W. p. lepidonota are similar to those of duidae but paler and with a browner crown and a light buff center to the belly. Females of W. p. griseiventris have a rufous-buff face, a plain lower back and rump, a pale gray throat, and gray underparts. Males of W. p. gutturalis have a black throat; females resemble female lepidonota but with a pale olive center to the belly.

== Distribution and habitat ==
The subspecies of the common scale-backed antbird are found thus:

- W. p. poecilinotus: central and southeastern Venezuela, the Guianas, and northeastern Brazil from Roraima to Amapá
- W. p. duidae: east-central Colombia, southwestern Venezuela, and northwestern Brazil along the Rio Negro
- W. p. lepidonota: southeastern Colombia, eastern Ecuador, and northeastern and east-central Peru
- W. p. griseiventris: south-central and southeastern Peru, northern Bolivia, and southwestern Amazonian Brazil between the rios Juruá and Madeira south into western Mato Grosso
- W. p. gutturalis: northeastern Peru and western Amazonian Brazil to the Rio Juruá

The common scale-backed antbird primarily inhabits the understorey of humid terra firme evergreen forest. It also occurs in várzea and igapó forest. In elevation it reaches 1,350 m (4,400 ft) in Brazil, 1,300 m (4,300 ft) in Venezuela, and 800 m (2,600 ft) in Colombia. In Ecuador it mostly occurs below 700 m (2,300 ft) but does reach 1,100 m (3,600 ft). In Peru it occurs locally to 1,350 m (4,400 ft) but is mostly below 900 m (3,000 ft).

== Behavior ==
=== Movement ===
The common scale-backed antbird is believed to be a year-round resident throughout its range.

=== Feeding ===
The common scale-backed antbird feeds mostly on a wide variety of arthropods; it has also been noted eating small lizards. It typically forages individually, in pairs, and in family groups, usually within about 1 m (3 ft) of the ground though sometimes as high as 3 m (10 ft) and rarely to 5 m (16 ft). In some parts of its range it joins mixed-species feeding flocks. It follows swarms of army ants that pass through its territory to capture prey fleeing the ants, but it just as often forages away from ant swarms. It captures prey mostly by short sallies from a perch to the ground but also to foliage, branches, and vines. It sometimes stays on the ground probing and flicking leaf litter. At ant swarms it defers to other species.

=== Breeding ===
The breeding season of the common scale-backed antbird varies greatly across its range, for instance spanning November to March in French Guiana and probably December to July in Ecuador. It possibly breeds in any month in Brazil. It has been documented building several types of nests, including an open cup of dry leaves and other fibers in an understorey palm, a cavity lined with dead leaves, an unlined hollow at the top of a stump, and a cup of dried grass on the ground. The usual clutch is two eggs. The female alone is believed to incubate at night but both parents do so during the day. Both parents also brood and provision nestlings. The incubation period and time to fledging are not known.

=== Vocalization ===
The common scale-backed antbird's songs are generally " a series...of long upslurred notes...with little space between them, each note rising in pitch and gaining in intensity, except final note or notes that decrease in intensity". The number of notes and some other features differ among individuals and also among the subspecies. In Venezuela it has been written as "pureeeee, pureeeee, pureeeee...", in Ecuador as "teeuw, tuweeé? tuweeé? tuweeé? tuweeé?", and in Peru as "hew hui hui hui? hui? hui? hui? hui? hui?". Its calls include a "sharp 'psit'...a usually descending 'chirr', [a] more abrupt chitter, [a] short whistle quickly repeated 3–4 times, [and] also a longer whistle that falls and then rises in pitch, sounding like 'cherri' ".

== Status ==
The IUCN has assessed the common scale-backed antbird as being of Least Concern. It has a very large range. Its population size is not known and is believed to be stable. No immediate threats have been identified. It is considered fairly common throughout its range, which includes many large protected areas. "Regions occupied by this species also encompass extensive intact habitat which, although not formally protected, seems to be at little near-term risk."
