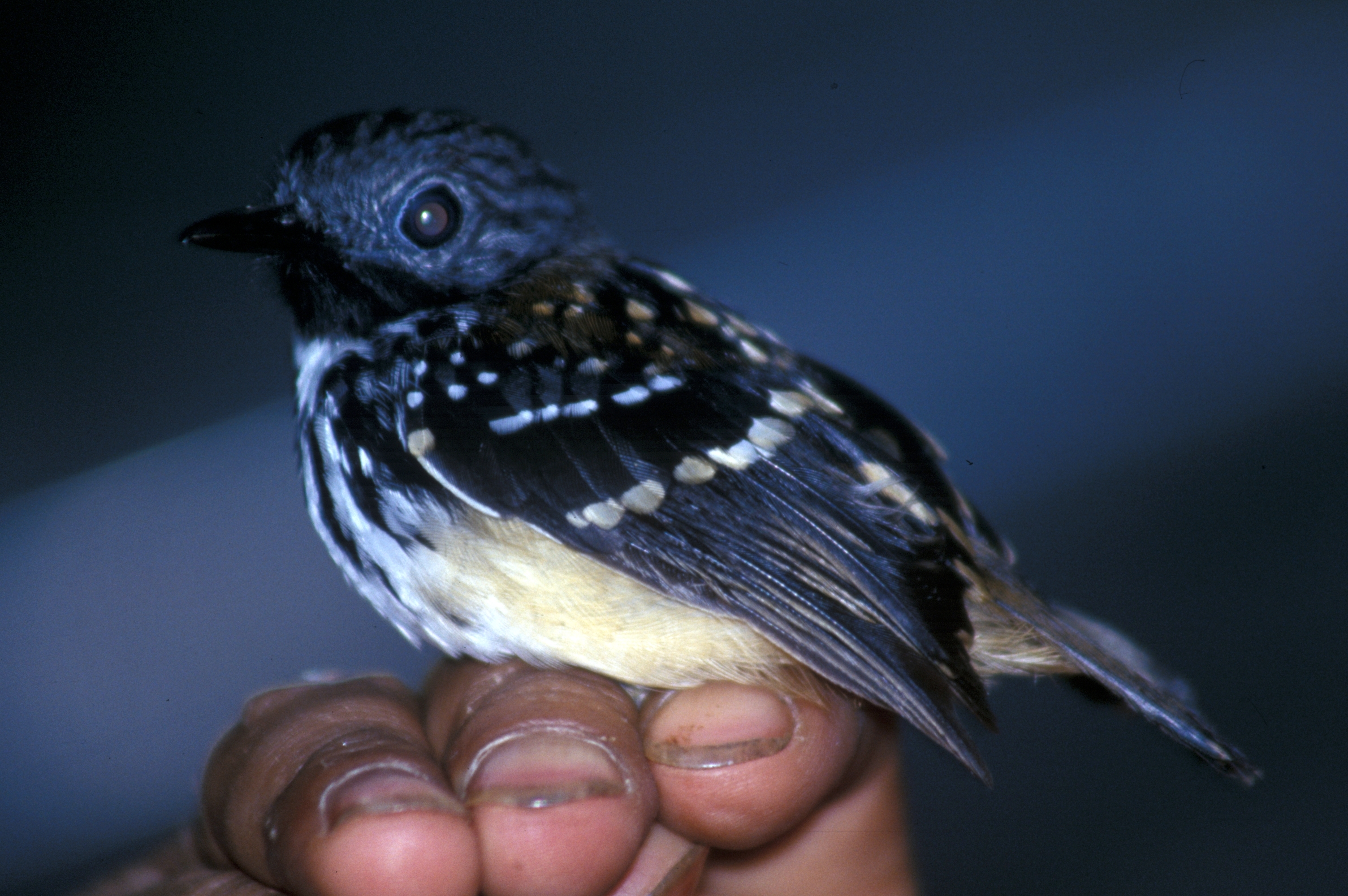

Conservation status
- Least Concern (IUCN 3.1)

Scientific classification
- Kingdom: Animalia
- Phylum: Chordata
- Class: Aves
- Order: Passeriformes
- Family: Thamnophilidae
- Genus: Hylophylax
- Species: H. naevius

Binomial name
- Hylophylax naevius (Gmelin, JF, 1789)

Synonyms
- Hylophylax naevia

= Spot-backed antbird =

Species of bird

The spot-backed antbird (Hylophylax naevius) is a species of bird in subfamily Thamnophilinae of family Thamnophilidae, the "typical antbirds". It is found in Bolivia, Brazil, Colombia, Ecuador, French Guiana, Guyana, Peru, Suriname, and Venezuela.

== Taxonomy and systematics ==
The spot-backed antbird was formally described in 1789 by the German naturalist Johann Friedrich Gmelin in his revised and expanded edition of Carl Linnaeus's Systema Naturae. He placed it with the manakins in the genus Pipra and coined the binomial name Pipra naevia. Gmelin based his description on the Fourmillier tacheté, de Cayenne that had been depicted in a hand-colored engraving by François-Nicolas Martinet that was published to accompany Comte de Buffon's Histoire Naturelle des Oiseaux. The specific epithet is from Latin naevius meaning "spotted". The spot-backed antbird is now placed with two other species in the genus Hylophylax that was introduced in 1909 by the American ornithologist Robert Ridgway.

The International Ornithological Congress and the Clements taxonomy recognize these five subspecies of the spot-backed antbird:

- H. n. theresae (Des Murs, 1856)
- H. n. peruvianus Carriker, 1932
- H. n. inexpectatus Carriker, 1932
- H. n. naevius (Gmelin, JF, 1789)
- H. n. ochraceus (Berlepsch, 1912)

BirdLife International's Handbook of the Birds of the World adds a sixth, H. n. consobrinus, that the other two systems include in H. n. naevius. Other authors have suggested that as many as three full species might be represented within the spot-backed antbird.

== Description ==
The spot-backed antbird is 10.5 to 11.5 cm (4.1 to 4.5 in) long and weighs 11 to 14 g (0.39 to 0.49 oz). Adult males of the nominate subspecies H. n. naevius have a dark yellowish brown crown and nape. Their upperparts are mostly dark yellowish brown; the center of their back is black with pale buff spots and they have a white patch between their scapulars. Their flight feathers are dark brown with black bases and their wing coverts black with wide white to pale buff tips. Their tail is dark reddish yellow-brown with white to pale buff tips and a black band above the tips. The face is mostly gray; their throat and the lower sides of their neck are black. Their underparts are mostly white with heavy black spots across the breast and along the sides. Their lower belly and undertail coverts are buff. Adult females are similar to males but have paler upperparts, buffier wing coverts, a white throat with a black band above it, and buff rather than white underparts with the same heavy black spots as males. Juveniles have no interscapular patch, no breast spots, and buffy brown underparts with an olive-brown band across the breast.

The other subspecies of the spot-backed antbird differ from the nominate and each other thus:

- H. n. peruvianus: grayer crown, more chestnut upperparts with more black area and paler spots, and more and bigger breast spots than nominate
- H. n. theresae: purer gray crown and more black on the back than peruvianus; olive-tinged gray tail with wider pale tip than nominate, more breast spots than nominate, and light olive-buff belly and undertail coverts
- H. n. inexpectatus: olive-gray crown, olive-brown back, and dark olive-gray tail
- H. n. ochraceus: grayish crown, small interscapular patch, small to no breast spots; male has ochre-yellow belly and undertail coverts and female has mostly ochre-yellow underparts

== Distribution and habitat ==
The subspecies of the spot-backed antbird are found thus:

- H. n. theresae: southeastern Ecuador south of the Rio Napo, Loreto Department in northeastern Peru, and western Amazonian Brazil south of the Amazon east to the Rio Tapajós and south to Rondônia
- H. n. peruvianus: Amazonas and San Martín departments in north-central Peru
- H. n. inexpectatus: east-central and southeastern Peru, Acre (state) in southwestern Brazil, and northwestern Bolivia
- H. n. naevius: southeastern Colombia south through eastern Ecuador into northern Peru and east through southern Venezuela, the Guianas, and northern Brazil north of the Amazon to the Atlantic
- H. n. ochraceus: Amazonian Brazil south of the Amazon between the rios Tapajós and Tocantins and south into northern Mato Grosso

The spot-backed antbird inhabits humid evergreen forest in the lowlands and Andean foothills. It is found in terra firme, várzea, and transitional forest types as well as secondary woodlands. It favors the forest understorey especially near openings caused by fallen trees and along watercourses. In elevation it reaches 1,100 m (3,600 ft) in Venezuela and Colombia, 1,300 m (4,300 ft) in Brazil, and 1,200 m (3,900 ft) in Peru. A few individuals reach 1,000 m (3,300 ft) in Ecuador but it is mostly found below 700 m (2,300 ft) there.

== Behavior ==
=== Movement ===
The spot-backed antbird is believed to be a year-round resident throughout its range.

=== Feeding ===
The spot-backed antbird feeds primarily on a wide variety insects and spiders. It is a facultative army ant follower, catching about half of its prey as it flees the swarms but seldom following them for a long time. They sometimes loosely associate with mixed-species feeding flocks. They forage as individuals, pairs, and small family groups and mostly within about 3 m (10 ft) of the ground. They hop among branches, typically in semi-open parts of the understorey, and take prey with sallies from a perch to the ground and by gleaning and lunging for prey on leaves, twigs, and branches.

=== Breeding ===
The spot-backed antbird's core breeding season varies geographically but overall the species appears to breed at any time of year. Its nest is a cup made variously of grasses, palm "hairs", fern rootlets, or fungal rhizomes. It is typically suspended from a branch fork near the ground and often partially or fully covered by hanging leaves. The most common clutch size is two eggs though there are many records of nests with one or three. Both parents incubate though it appears that the female alone does so at night, and both parents are assumed to brood and provision nestlings. The incubation period is not known; at one nest fledging occurred 12.5 days after hatch.

=== Vocalization ===
The spot-backed antbird's song varies among the subspecies; it is generally "a long series of doublets". In Ecuador it is described as "a fast, high-pitched, and somewhat wheezy 'wur, weépur-weépur-weépur-weépur-weépur-weépur-weépur-weépur'...loudest in the middle and fading at end". In Brazil, where several subspecies are found, it is "[v]ery/extr. high, slightly descending series of 10-12 strident, run together 'tjuwit- notes; depending on region, 'tjuwit-' sounding as double note or reduced to 'tWit---' ". The species' calls "include abrupt, spitting notes, almost always in groups of 2–10; a rattle of variable length, usually descending in pitch; and [a] long (e.g. 0·2–0·4 seconds) downward-inflected whistle".

== Status ==
The IUCN has assessed the spot-backed antbird as being of Least Concern. It has a very large range; its population size is not known and is believed to be stable. No immediate threats have been identified. It is considered fairly common to common in much of its range though uncommon to fairly common in Venezuela and Peru. It is found in several protected areas in almost all of the countries it inhabits.
