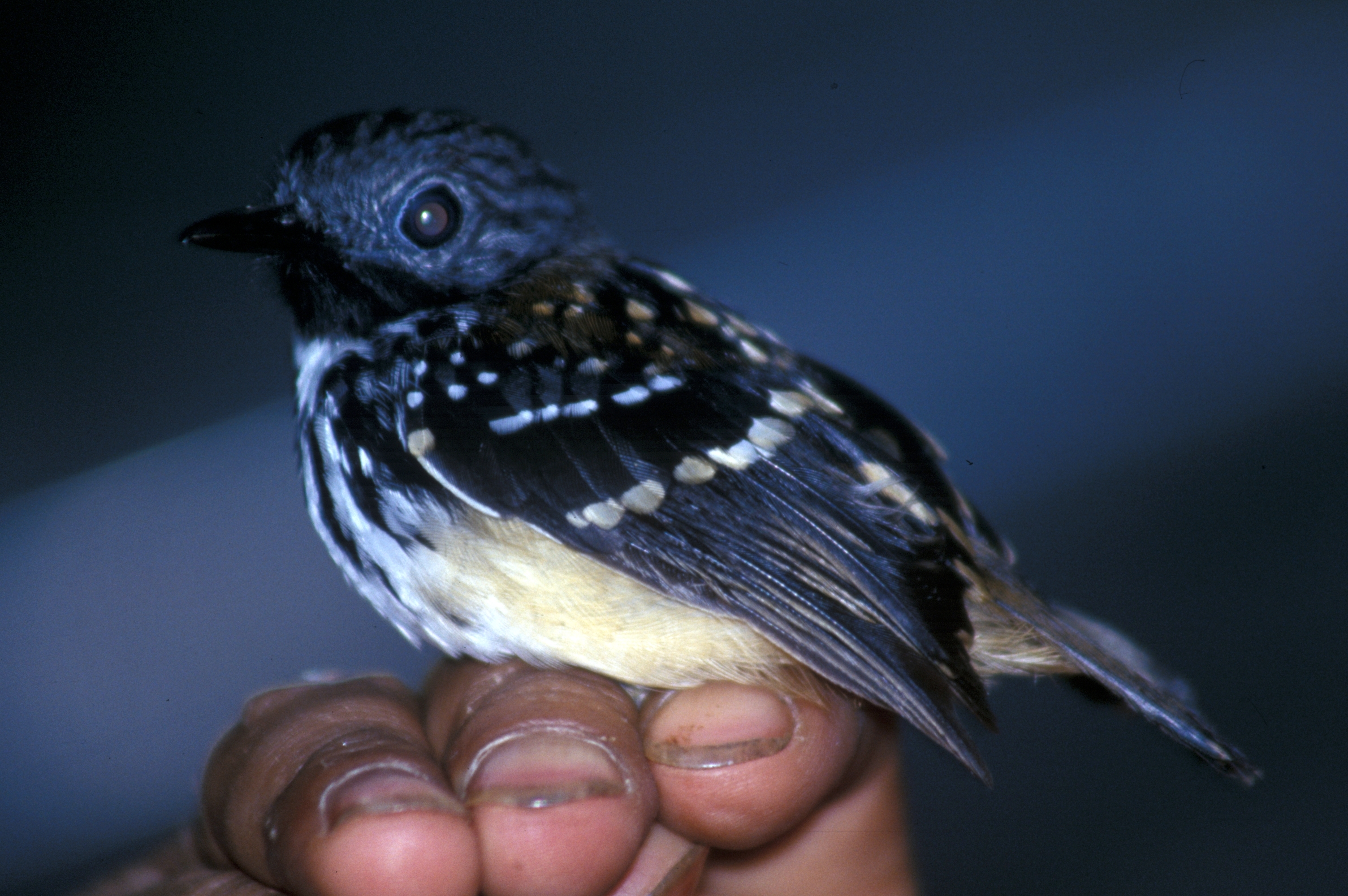
- Spot-backed antbird (Hylophylax naevius)

Scientific classification
- Kingdom: Animalia
- Phylum: Chordata
- Class: Aves
- Order: Passeriformes
- Family: Thamnophilidae
- Genus: Hylophylax; Ridgway, 1909

Type species
- Conopophaga naevioides Lafresnaye, 1847

= Hylophylax =

Genus of birds

Hylophylax is a genus of bird in the family Thamnophilidae.

The genus Hylophylax was erected by the American ornithologist Robert Ridgway in 1909 with the spotted antbird as the type species. It contains three species:

- Spotted antbird, Hylophylax naevioides
- Spot-backed antbird, Hylophylax naevius
- Dot-backed antbird, Hylophylax punctulatus

The common scale-backed antbird was formerly included in Hylophylax. A molecular study found that it was not closely related to the other species and it was therefore moved to a newly erected genus Willisornis.
