= Pale-faced bare-eye =

Conservation status
- Least Concern (IUCN 3.1)

Scientific classification
- Kingdom: Animalia
- Phylum: Chordata
- Class: Aves
- Order: Passeriformes
- Family: Thamnophilidae
- Genus: Phlegopsis
- Species: P. borbae

Binomial name
- Phlegopsis borbae Hellmayr, 1907

Synonyms
- Skutchia borbae

Species of bird

The pale-faced bare-eye (Phlegopsis borbae), sometimes known as the pale-faced antbird, is a species of bird in subfamily Thamnophilinae of family Thamnophilidae, the "typical antbirds". It is endemic to Brazil.

== Taxonomy and systematics ==
The pale-faced bare-eye was originally described as Phlegopsis borbae. It was later moved to the monotypic genus Skutchia because its plumage differed significantly from that of other Phlegopsis bare-eyes. Some authors at that time changed its English name to bare-eyed antbird. Following a molecular study it was found to be sister to the black-spotted bare-eye (Phlegopsis nigromaculata) so Skutchia was merged into Phlegopsis and the species' English name was restored to "bare-eye".

The pale-faced bare-eye has no subspecies.

== Description ==
The pale-faced bare-eye is 16.5 to 17.5 cm (6.5 to 6.9 in) long and weighs about 50 g (1.8 oz). The sexes are alike. Adults have long white feathers on their forehead and lores, stiff black feathers above their eye, and a patch of bare whitish skin behind it. Their crown is dark rufous. Their upperparts are dark olive-brown with a scattering of black bars on the back. Their wings are chestnut and their tail blackish brown with a browner base. Their throat and breast are cinnamon-rufous with a band of black and white bars below them. The rest of their underparts are dull brown.

== Distribution and habitat ==
The pale-faced bare-eye is found in central Amazonian Brazil south of the Amazon from the Rio Madeira east to the Rio Tapajós and Rio Aripuanã and south to the Rio Roosevelt. It primarily inhabits the understorey of humid terra firme evergreen forest. In some areas it favors upland forest with many palms in the understorey. It occurs below an elevation of 150 m (500 ft).

== Behavior ==
=== Movement ===
The pale-faced bare-eye is believed to be a year-round resident throughout its range.

=== Feeding ===
The pale-faced bare-eye is an obligate ant follower that feeds on a variety of arthropods that flee foraging army ant swarms, primarily those of Eciton burchelli. It typically forages individually, in pairs, and in family groups, perching within about 1 m (3 ft) of the ground (though sometimes as high as 3 m (10 ft)) and sallying or pouncing to the ground after prey. It occasionally makes short aerial sallies and also flips leaves on the ground to find prey. It is dominant over many other ant followers, even some that are larger than it.

=== Breeding ===
Almost nothing is known about the pale-faced bare-eye's breeding biology. Its nesting season appears to end by April. It has been observed courtship feeding.

=== Vocalization ===
The pale-faced bare-eye's song is "2-3 very high, long, slightly descending notes, the last one esp. rather mournful". Its calls include a "loud 'psit', a descending 'chirr' diminishing in intensity, and a series of deep short notes delivered rapidly and usually descending in pitch".

== Status ==
The IUCN has assessed the pale-faced bare-eye as being of Least Concern. Its population size is not known and is believed to be decreasing. No immediate threats have been identified. It is not well known and "appears to be uncommon to rare within its small total range". It occurs in Tapajós National Park, which is "highly threatened by gold-miners, squatters and, probably most seriously, hydro-electric development of the Tapajós Basin".
