= Argus bare-eye =

Scientific classification (disputed)
- Domain: Eukaryota
- Kingdom: Animalia
- Phylum: Chordata
- Class: Aves
- Order: Passeriformes
- Family: Thamnophilidae
- Genus: Phlegopsis
- Species: P. nigromaculata × P. erythroptera

Synonyms
- Phlegopsis barringeri Meyer de Schauensee, 1951

Species of bird

The Argus bare-eye (Phlegopsis barringeri) is a species of bird in the family Thamnophilidae. Known only from a single male specimen taken in 1951 in Colombia, its taxonomic validity is questionable, and most authorities do not recognize it, following Willis (1979) and Graves (1992), where it was shown to be a hybrid between the black-spotted and the reddish-winged bare-eye.
