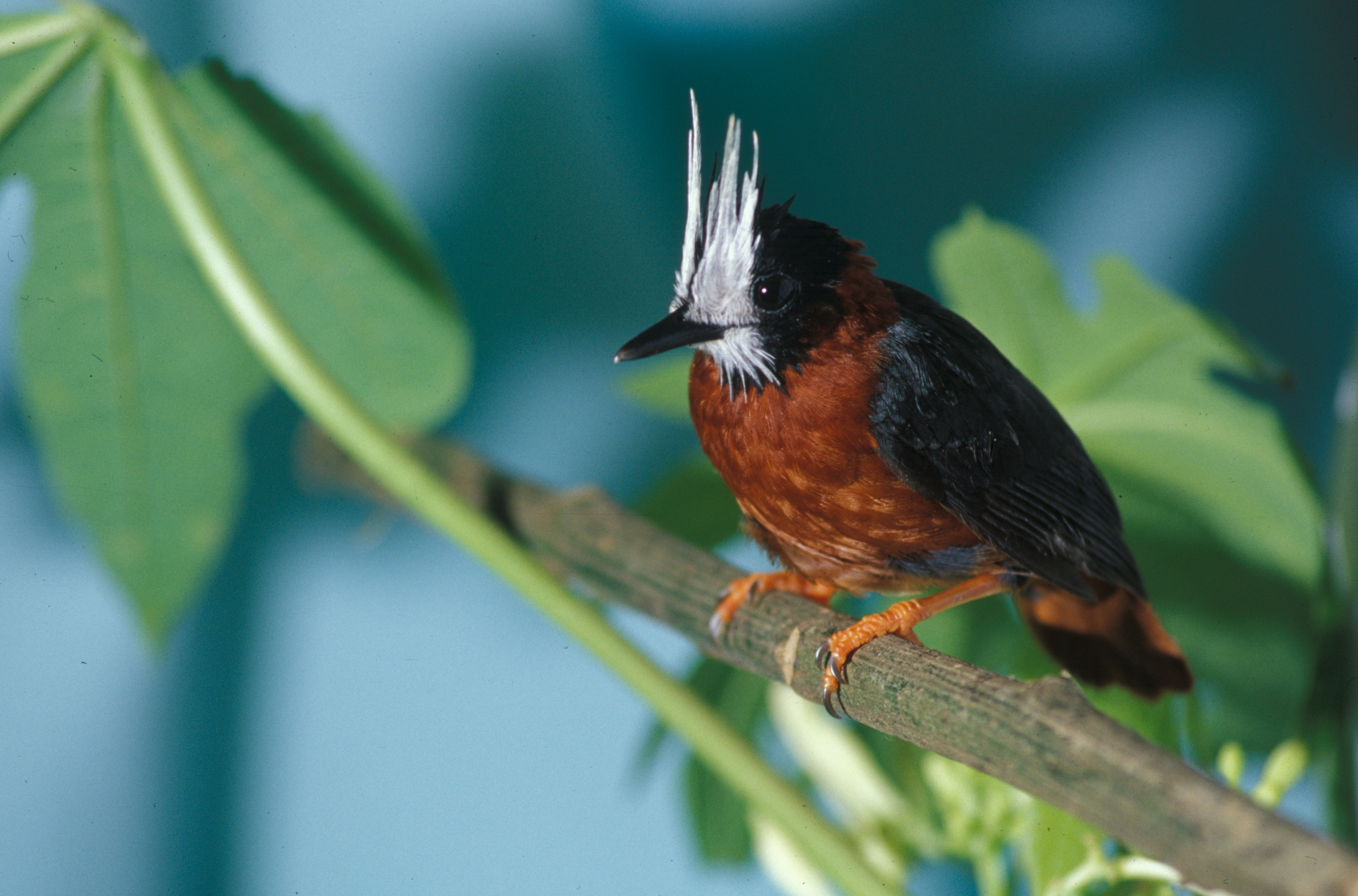
- White-plumed antbird (Pithys albifrons)

Scientific classification
- Kingdom: Animalia
- Phylum: Chordata
- Class: Aves
- Order: Passeriformes
- Family: Thamnophilidae
- Genus: Pithys; Vieillot, 1818

Type species
- Pithys leucops = Pithys albifrons Vieillot, 1818

= Pithys =

Genus of birds

Pithys is a genus of insectivorous passerine binds in the antbird family (Thamnophilidae) found in the lowland forests of South America. The genus includes two species: Pithys albifrons (White-plumed Antbird) and Pithys castanea (White-masked Antbird). These birds are known for their association with army ant swarms, which they follow to catch insects and other small animals that flee the swarm. This specialized feeding behavior, known as obligate ant-following, is rare among birds and defines much of the genus’s ecology.

Pithys albifrons is about 12 cm in length. It is smaller than most species of its family, weighing 26 grams on average. This bird has a chestnut-colored underside, dark bluish-gray upperparts, and upright white feather tufts above the eyes and on the chin. The crown and throat are black, and the face shows narrow white stripes above the eyes. The legs are yellowish-orange. Young Pithys lack the white plumes and have duller plumage overall. This species is typically found in dense understory and can be observed darting to the ground during foraging. Its vocalizations include a high, falling “tjeeeew” song and a sharp “sreew” or “churr” call, which it uses frequently at active ant swarms.

Pithys castanea has reddish-brown plumage and a pale facial area, which gives the species its common name. It is more restricted in range than P. albifrons. The White-masked Antbird was first documented in 1937, when a specimen was collected in northern Peru. It was not recorded again until 2001, when it was rediscovered in Loreto, Peru. The species is listed as Near Threatened due to ongoing habitat loss and its limited known distribution. Very little is known about its behavior compared to its congener, and it remains one of the more elusive ant-following birds in the region.

== Taxonomy ==
The genus Pithys was established by the French ornithologist Louis Pierre Vieillot in 1818. It belongs to the subfamily Thamnophilinae within the family Thamnophilidae, a diverse group of insectivorous birds known as antbirds. Members of this family are mainly found in Central America and South America and are most diverse in the Amazon Basin.

The name Pithys may derive from a blend of Latin and Greek roots, potentially connected to earlier genera like Pipra or Thlypis, but its exact origin is uncertain. The two species within Pithys are part of a specialized group of tropical birds known as obligate ant-followers, dependent on Eciton burchellii to flush prey from the forest floor. Pithys species rely on this strategy for most of their feeding.

Taxonomically, Pithys is distinguished from related genera such as Gymnopithys and Rhegmatorhina. Differences include vocalizations, plumage, and behavior at swarms. Because of their behavior and sensitivity to habitat change, Pithys species are often used in ecological surveys to assess forest health. The stability of the genus has remained consistent across major taxonomic reviews. Because of their specialized behavior and sensitivity to habitat changes, Pithys species are often included in ecological surveys and biodiversity monitoring in tropical forests. Their presence or absence can provide insight into the condition of understory bird communities and the broader health of rainforest ecosystems.

== Habitat ==
Pithys species inhabit the Amazon Basin, including parts of Brazil, Colombia, Venezuela, Ecuador, and Peru. They occur in terra firme forest, a rainforest type that stays dry year-round. These forests support dense vegetation and large ant colonies essential to their foraging.

They prefer mature, continuous forest, especially with a well-developed understory. They are rarely found near edges, floodplain forest, or disturbed areas. Studies confirm their role as forest interior specialists.

Pithys albifrons is found at elevations up to 1350 meters. Pithys castanea has a smaller range, restricted to lowland forest in northern Peru. Both are vulnerable to habitat fragmentation.

Both species are strongly affected by habitat fragmentation and deforestation. Research shows that Pithys albifrons and other obligate ant-followers often disappear from forest patches smaller than 10 hectares.

These birds may require home ranges of 1 to 5 kilometers across to locate and follow ant swarms. Their movement across open areas, such as roads or agricultural clearings, is limited. In road-edge studies, they were much less likely to cross gaps, even when forest continued on the other side.

== Feeding ==
Pithys species feed by following army ant swarms, targeting insects and small vertebrates that flee. They do not eat the ants. Prey includes insects, spiders, centipedes, and lizards. As the ants move through leaf litter, they disturb insects, spiders, centipedes, and small lizards, which the birds quickly catch. Pithys birds usually forage near the front of the swarm, where prey is most concentrated, and move actively along the ground or low branches.

These birds are classified as obligate ant-followers, meaning their foraging depends almost entirely on the presence of army ant swarms. Unlike generalist insectivores, Pithys species do not hunt independently in the forest. Instead, they may follow a single swarm for several hours or travel long distances to locate active swarms, sometimes using vocalizations or memory of past swarm locations.

At each swarm, birds compete for access to prey. A feeding hierarchy often forms, with larger or more aggressive species taking the best positions. Pithys albifrons is usually displaced by more dominant ant-followers such as rufous-throated antbird (Gymnopithys rufigula) or white-chinned woodcreeper (Dendrocincla merula). As a result, it moves frequently between swarms, which increases the chance of being caught in mist nets during field studies.

Although they typically forage alone or in pairs, Pithys species may also join mixed-species flocks, especially when ant activity is low. Flocking may help them find food or reduce the risk of predation.

In disturbed or secondary forests, army ant swarms are less frequent, making foraging more difficult. Without regular access to active swarms, Pithys birds are unable to feed efficiently and are often absent from degraded habitats. Their reliance on ant swarms makes them highly sensitive to changes in forest structure and climate.

== Lifespan ==
Pithys species are highly sensitive to changes in their environment. They rely on large areas of mature forest, stable microclimates, and the regular presence of army ant swarms to survive. Because of these needs, both Pithys albifrons and Pithys castanea are affected by deforestation, selective logging, and forest fragmentation.

Survival rates vary by region. In eastern Amazonia, survival may reach 80%, while in the west it drops to around 42%. These differences may reflect local conditions such as predator pressure, food availability, or climate. They may live 5 to 8 years in quality habitats.

Forest fragmentation reduces survivability. In one study, P. albifrons declined by over 14 captures per 1,000 net hours post-fragmentation.

P. castanea is more restricted and vulnerable to continued deforestation. Both species are indicators of forest quality and swarm presence.

== Breeding and Nesting ==
White-plumed Antbirds breed at different times across their range: July–April in Venezuela, December–August in Guyana, and December–May in French Guiana.

They build cup-shaped nests low to the ground, made of leaves, roots, and soft materials. Females lay two eggs, and both sexes incubate. Chicks hatch in ~14 days and fledge after 12. Each parent cares for one fledgling.

P. castanea nesting behavior is unknown but presumed similar.

== Sounds and Communication ==
White-plumed Antbirds make a few different calls. They often give a sharp, falling “churr” or “jeer” sound when foraging near ant swarms. These sounds help them stay in touch with their mate or let other birds know where they are.

The White-masked Antbird has a different song. It makes a high, whiny sound that rises in pitch—something like “huuuuuureee?”—plus a few soft, chime-like notes. These calls are useful for identifying the species and are likely used to keep in contact when moving through dense forest.

== Conservation and Threats ==
The White-plumed Antbird is listed as Least Concern, but sensitive to fragmentation and edge effects. But it still faces some challenges. These birds are sensitive to changes in the forest. When forests are broken up or cleared, they may disappear from small patches because they rely on large areas to follow ant swarms.

The White-masked Antbird is Near Threatened, found only in a small part of northern Peru, with continuing habitat loss. The species was first collected in 1937 and wasn’t seen again until 2001, which shows just how hard it is to study and how easily it could be overlooked or lost.

== Role in the Forest ==
Both species serve as indicator species due to their ecological dependence on undisturbed forest and army ant swarms.

Their presence reflects healthy habitat. Their absence may indicate fragmentation, climate disruption, or ecosystem decline.

The species in this genus are specialist ant-followers that depend on swarms of army ants to flush insects and other arthropods out of the leaf litter.

The genus was erected by the French ornithologist Louis Pierre Vieillot in 1818. The type species is the white-plumed antbird (Pithys albifrons). It contains two species:

== Species ==
Image	Scientific name	Common name	Distribution
	Pithys albifrons	White-plumed antbird	Brazil, Colombia, Venezuela, Ecuador, Peru, Guyana, Suriname, and French Guiana
	Pithys castaneus	White-masked antbird	Peru.
