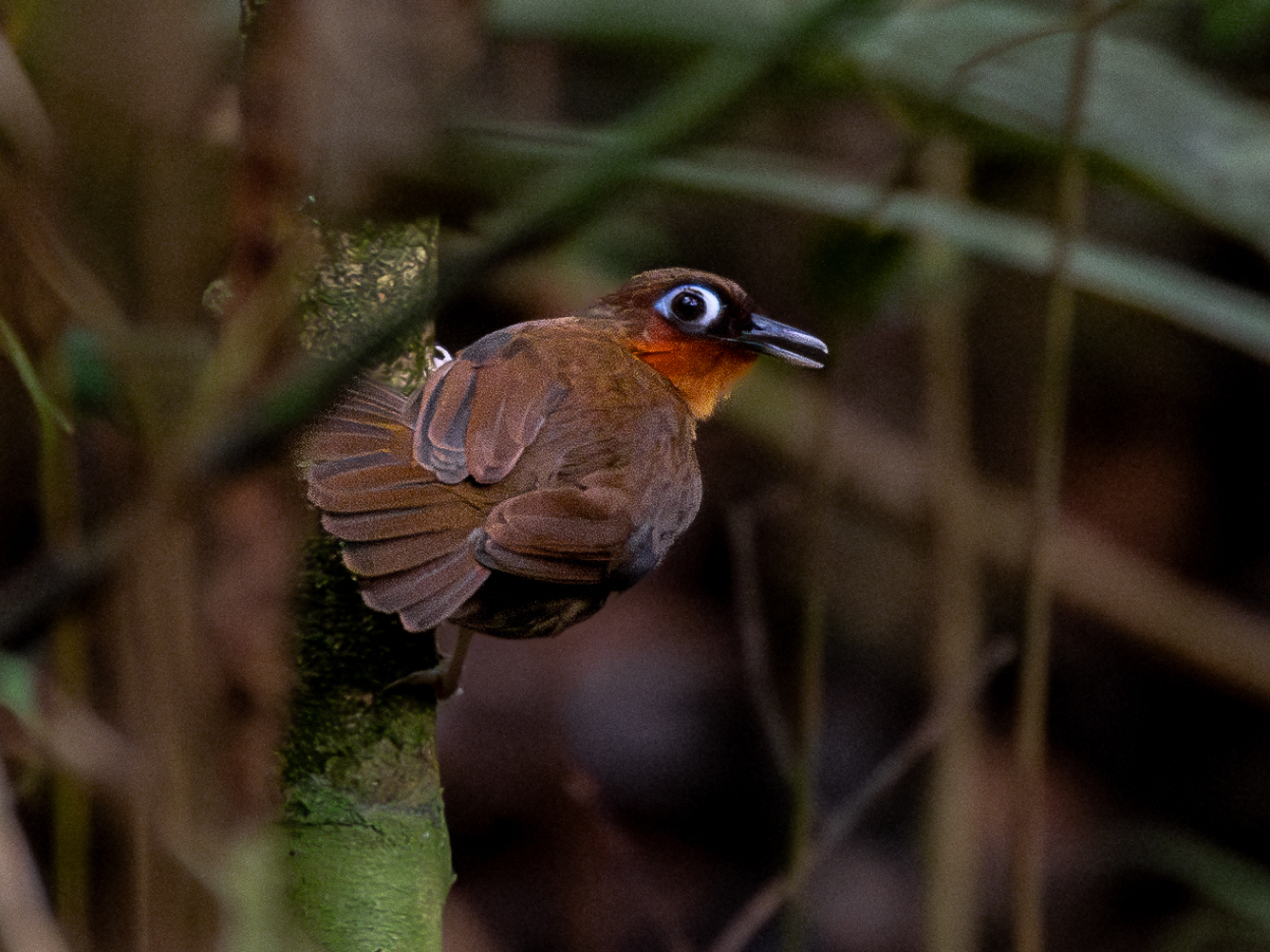

Conservation status
- Least Concern (IUCN 3.1)

Scientific classification
- Kingdom: Animalia
- Phylum: Chordata
- Class: Aves
- Order: Passeriformes
- Family: Thamnophilidae
- Genus: Gymnopithys
- Species: G. rufigula

Binomial name
- Gymnopithys rufigula (Boddaert, 1783)

= Rufous-throated antbird =

Species of bird

The rufous-throated antbird (Gymnopithys rufigula) is a species of bird in subfamily Thamnophilinae of family Thamnophilidae, the "typical antbirds". It is found in Brazil, French Guiana, Guyana, Suriname, and Venezuela.

== Taxonomy and systematics ==
The rufous-throated antbird was described by the French polymath Georges-Louis Leclerc, Comte de Buffon in 1775 in his Histoire Naturelle des Oiseaux from a specimen collected in Cayenne, French Guiana. The bird was also illustrated in a hand-colored plate engraved by François-Nicolas Martinet in the Planches Enluminées D'Histoire Naturelle which was produced under the supervision of Edme-Louis Daubenton to accompany Buffon's text. Neither the plate caption nor Buffon's description included a scientific name but in 1783 the Dutch naturalist Pieter Boddaert coined the binomial name Turdus rufigula in his catalogue of the Planches Enluminées. The rufous-throated antbird is now placed in the genus Gymnopithys that was introduced by the French ornithologist Charles Lucien Bonaparte in 1857 with the rufous-throated antbird as the type species. The name Gymnopithys combines the Ancient Greek gumnos meaning "bare" or "naked" with the name of the antbird genus Pithys that was erected by the French ornithologist Louis Pierre Vieillot in 1818. The specific epithet rufigula combines the Latin words rufus "red" and gula "throat". The rufous-throated antbird shares genus Gymnopithys with the bicolored antbird (G. bicolor) and white-throated antbird (G. leucaspis).

The rufous-throated antbird has three subspecies, the nominate G. r. rufigula (Boddaert, 1783), G. r. pallidus (Cherrie, 1909), and G. r. pallidigula (Phelps & Phelps Jr, 1947).

== Description ==
The rufous-throated antbird is 11.5 to 14 cm (4.5 to 5.5 in) long and weighs 26 to 32 g (0.92 to 1.1 oz). Adult males of the nominate subspecies have a brownish black forehead and lores, an olive-brown crown and nape, and bare blue skin around the eye. Their back and rump are olive-brown with a hidden white patch between the scapulars. Their wings and tail are dark yellow-brown. Their cheeks and upper throat are rufous-chestnut, their lower throat and upper breast cinnamon, and their sides, flanks, and belly olive-brown. Adult females are duller than males and their intrascapular patch is cinnamon. Subspecies G. r. pallidigula has a paler throat and belly center and a more ochraceous breast than the nominate. G. r. pallidus resembles pallidigula with a paler and more olivaceous back. The subspecies are so similar that they may represent clinal variation.

== Distribution and habitat ==
The rufous-throated antbird is a species of the Guianan Shield. The nominate subspecies is the most widespread. It is found from the drainage of the Rio Cuyuní in extreme eastern Venezuela east through the Guianas and in northern Brazil east of the Rio Negro and north of the Amazon. Subspecies G. r. pallidus is found in southern Venezuela's Bolívar state except for the Cuyuní drainage and in Amazonas state except for the vicinity of Pica Yavita-Pimichín. G. r. pallidigula has a limited range near Pica Yavita-Pimichín in extreme southern Venezuela's Amazonas state.

The rufous-throated antbird primarily inhabits humid lowland and foothill terra firme evergreen forest. It almost entirely remains in the forest undergrowth and seldom enters open areas or crosses streams and roads. In elevation it occurs below 900 m (3,000 ft) in most of its range but is found locally as high as 1,200 m (3,900 ft).

== Behavior ==
=== Movement ===
The rufous-throated antbird is not known to migrate.

=== Feeding ===
The rufous-throated antbird is an obligate ant follower that feeds on a wide variety of arthropods that flee foraging army ant swarms, especially those of Eciton burchelli. Its diet also includes small lizards. It typically forages individually, in pairs, and in family groups, perching within about 1 m (3 ft) of the ground though as high as 3 m (10 ft), and sallying or pouncing to the ground after prey. Up to 20 birds have been noted at a swarm.

=== Breeding ===
The rufous-throated antbird appears to nest at any time in Brazil but its season is concentrated between January and April. Its seasons span at least December to June in Guyana, June/July and November/December in French Guiana, and December in Venezuela. The few known nests were small cups variously made from dead palm leaves, small twigs, and vine stems with a scanty softer lining. Two were placed in cavities in rotten tree stumps. The usual clutch size is two eggs. The female alone incubates at night and both parents are believed to incubate during the day. Both parents provision nestlings. The incubation period is not known; fledging occurs 13 to 14 days after hatch.

=== Vocalization ===
The rufous-throated antbird has a large vocal repertoire, most of which are calls. Its primary song is loud, "a high, whinnylike [series] of notes that quickly rise and fall, we-whe-whee-HE-He-he'hu'we'we. It has also been described as "complicated; starts with some very high, level, fluted 'weee' notes, which accelerate and descend, becoming a short rattle before leveling-out and decelerating as low grating 'sree-sree-sree' notes". Its calls include a "harsh, vibrant 'chirr'...diminishing slightly in pitch and intensity, and abrupt 'chup' notes, usually doubled but also in groups of 3–4".

== Status ==
The IUCN has assessed the rufous-throated antbird as being of Least Concern. It has a very large range; its population size is not known and is believed to be stable. No immediate threats have been identified. It is considered fairly common across its range. It occurs in many protected areas and its range "encompasses extensive areas of intact habitat which, although not formally protected, are seemingly at little risk of development in [the] near term".
