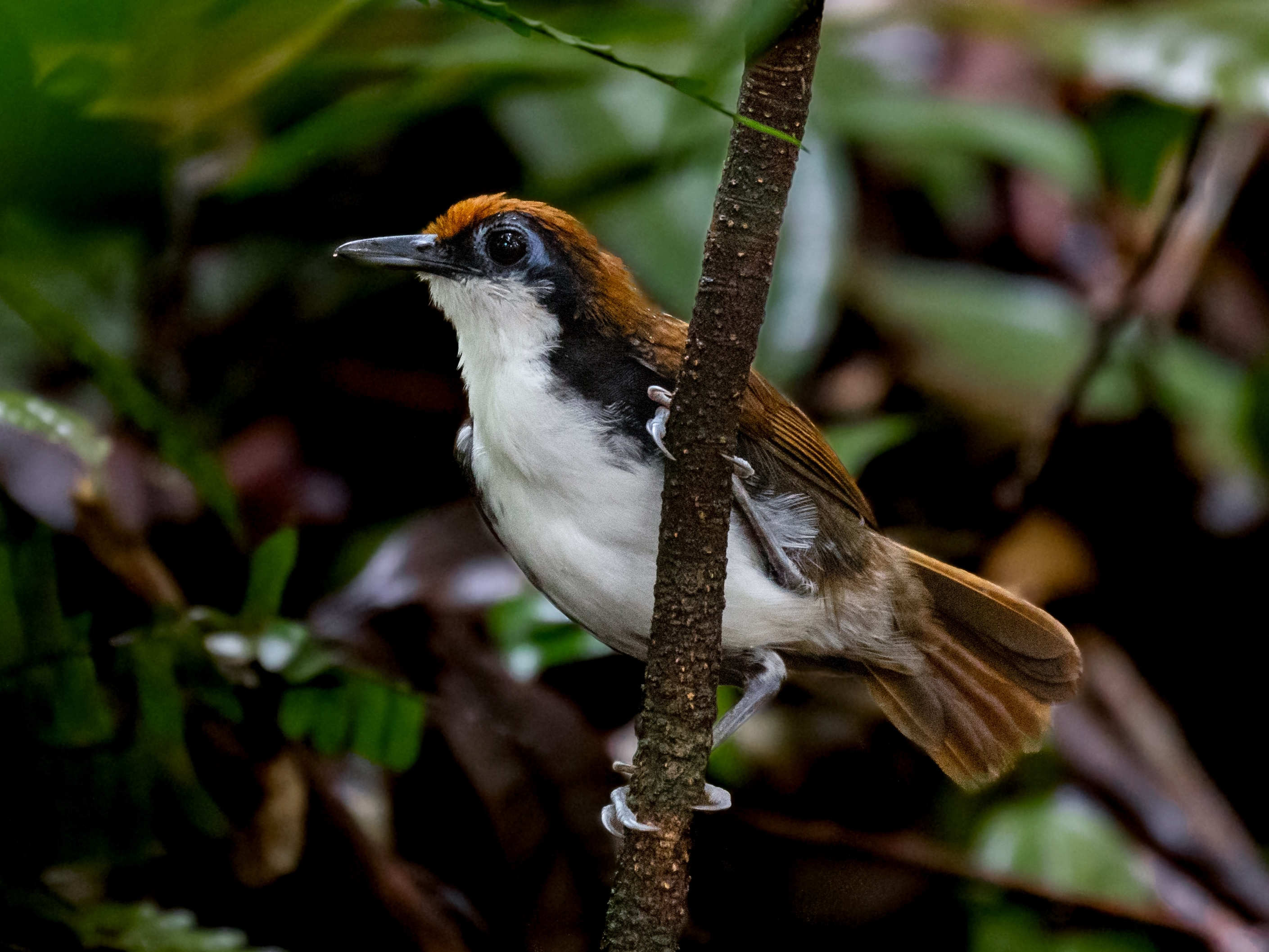
- Gymnopithys bicolor - Bicolored Antbird

Conservation status
- Least Concern (IUCN 3.1)

Scientific classification
- Kingdom: Animalia
- Phylum: Chordata
- Class: Aves
- Order: Passeriformes
- Family: Thamnophilidae
- Genus: Gymnopithys
- Species: G. leucaspis

Binomial name
- Gymnopithys leucaspis (Sclater, PL, 1855)

= White-cheeked antbird =

Species of bird

The white-cheeked antbird (Gymnopithys leucaspis) is an insectivorous bird in subfamily Thamnophilinae of family Thamnophilidae, the "typical antbirds". It is found in Brazil, Colombia, Ecuador, and Peru.

== Taxonomy and systematics ==
The English zoologist Philip Sclater described what is now the white-cheeked antbird in 1855 and coined the binomial name Myrmeciza leucaspis. It was later given the English name bicolored antbird (now Gymnopithys bicolor) and included what is now that separate species. They were split into separate species based on the results of a 2007 genetic study that found that the white-cheeked antbird was more similar to the rufous-throated antbird (G. rufigula) than it was to the bicolored antbird. Because of the principle of priority it retained the original specific epithet leucaspis despite the change of English name. All three are now placed in genus Gymnopithys which was introduced by the French ornithologist Charles Lucien Bonaparte in 1857. These three antbirds are the only members of genus Gymnopithys.

The white-cheeked antbird has these four subspecies:

- G. l. leucaspis (Sclater, PL, 1855)
- G. l. castaneus Zimmer, JT, 1937
- G. l. peruanus Zimmer, JT, 1937
- G. l. lateralis Todd, 1927

== Description ==
The white-cheeked antbird is 13.5 to 15 cm (5.3 to 5.9 in) long and averages about 24 g (0.85 oz). Adult males of the nominate subspecies G. l. leucaspis have a chestnut-brown crown and nape. They have bare blue skin around the eye and a blackish band from the lores through the eye that continues down the side of the neck and along the flanks. Their back, rump, wings, and tail are chestnut-brown with some rufous edging to the wing and tail feathers. Their cheeks, throat, and breast are white and their lower belly dark brown. Adult females have the same plumage with the addition of a cinnamon patch between the scapulars. Juveniles have brownish underparts before the white feathers emerge. Subspecies G. l. castaneus is darker than the nominate with blacker sides. G. l. peruanus has darker upperparts than the nominate. G. l. lateralis has browner upperparts than the nominate with paler undertail coverts than can be white.

== Distribution and habitat ==
The subspecies of the white-cheeked antbird are found thus:

- G. l. leucaspis: eastern Colombia's Meta Department
- G. l. castaneus: from Putumayo Department in south-central Colombia south through eastern Ecuador west of the Rio Napo into northern Peru to the Rio Marañón
- G. l. peruanus: north-central Peru south of the Marañón in Amazonas, Loreto, and Martín departments
- G. l. lateralis: southeastern Colombia from Caquetá Department south into extreme northeastern Peru east of the Rio Napo and east into Brazil north of the Amazon to the Rio Negro

The white-cheeked antbird primarily inhabits humid lowland and foothill terra firme evergreen forest and nearby mature secondary forest. It almost entirely remains in the forest undergrowth. In elevation it reaches 1,000 m (3,300 ft) in Colombia and 750 m (2,500 ft) in Ecuador and Peru.

== Behavior ==
=== Movement ===
The white-cheeked antbird is not known to migrate.

=== Feeding ===
The white-cheeked antbird is an obligate ant follower that feeds on a wide variety of arthropods that flee foraging army ant swarms. Its diet also includes small frogs and lizards. It typically forages individually, in pairs, and in family groups, perching within about 1 m (3 ft) of the ground though as high as 5 m (16 ft), and sallying or pouncing to the ground after prey. Up to a dozen birds have been noted at a swarm. It is dominant over smaller antbirds but subordinate to larger species of other families such as woodcreepers.

=== Breeding ===
The white-cheeked antbird appears to breed in any month in Ecuador, and dependent fledglings have been noted in July in Peru. Nothing else is known about the species' breeding biology.

=== Vocalization ===
The white-cheeked antbird's primary song is a series that "begins with upslurred whistles at even pitch that shorten into rather abrupt notes dropping in frequency and intensity, then lengthen and increase again in intensity, finally decreasing in intensity and becoming harsh". It has also been described as a "hurried series starting with very high, fluted 'weéh weeh' notes, becoming sharp and higher before hurrying down to a few low snarls". Its calls include a "harsh, vibrant 'chirr'...diminishing slightly in pitch and intensity, and abrupt 'chup' notes, usually doubled but also in groups of 3–4".

== Status ==
The IUCN did not recognize the white-cheeked antbird until 2016 when it was assessed as being of Least Concern. It has a very large range; its population size is not known and is believed to be decreasing. No immediate threats have been identified. It is considered fairly common across its range. It occurs in many protected areas, both governmental and private, and its range "encompasses extensive intact habitat which is not formally protected, but is still at low risk of development in [the] immediate future".
