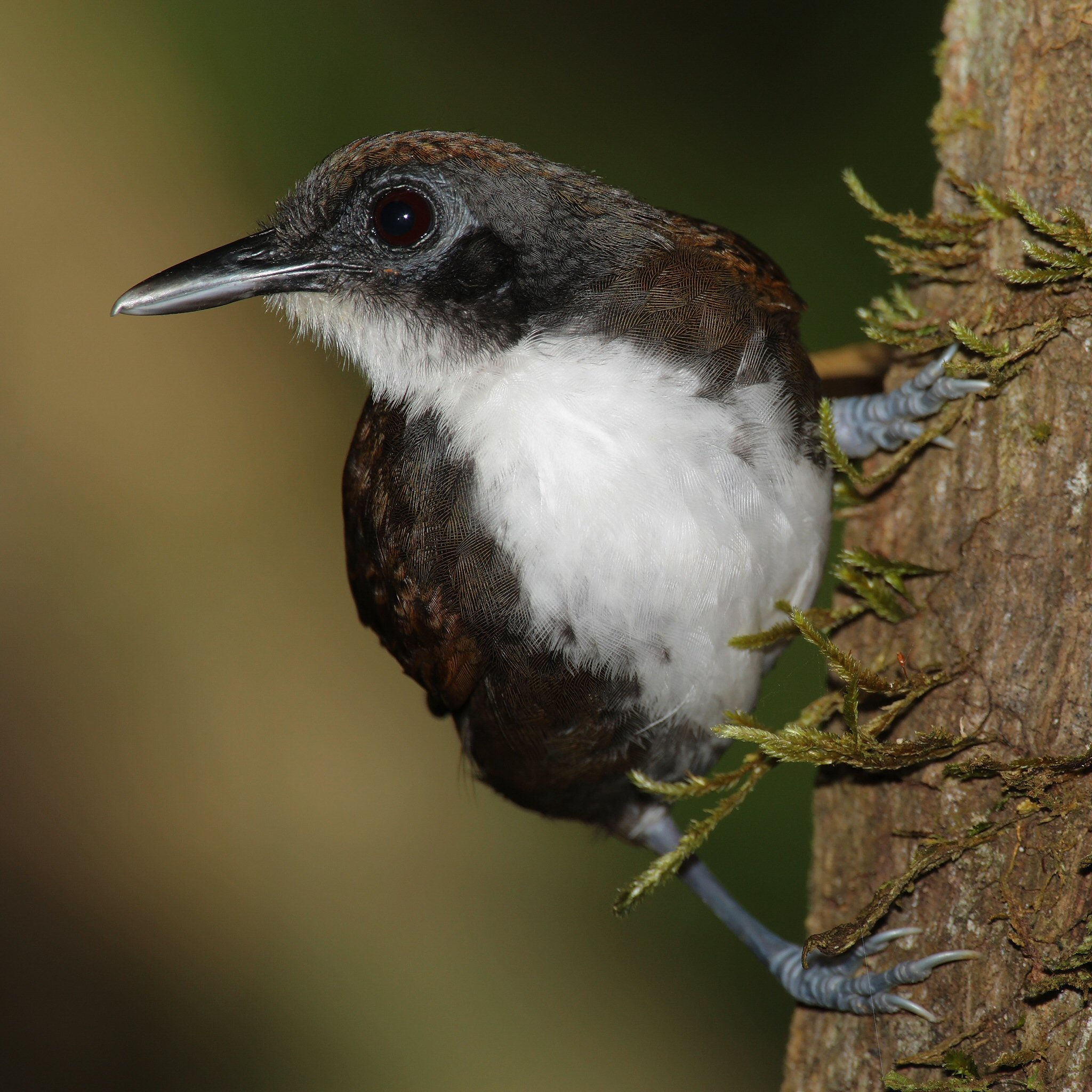
- Bicolored antbird (Gymnopithys bicolor)

Scientific classification
- Kingdom: Animalia
- Phylum: Chordata
- Class: Aves
- Order: Passeriformes
- Family: Thamnophilidae
- Genus: Gymnopithys; Bonaparte, 1857

Type species
- Turdus pectoralis Latham, 1790

= Gymnopithys =

Genus of birds

Gymnopithys is a genus of passerine birds in the antbird family, Thamnophilidae.

The species in this genus are specialist ant-followers that depend on swarms of army ants to flush arthropods out of the leaf litter.

== Taxonomy ==
The genus Gymnopithys was introduced by the French ornithologist Charles Lucien Bonaparte in 1857 with the rufous-throated antbird as the type species. The name Gymnopithys combines the Ancient Greek gumnos meaning "bare" or "naked" with the name of the antbird genus Pithys that was erected by the French ornithologist Louis Pierre Vieillot in 1818. The white-cheeked antbird and the bicolored antbird were formerly considered as conspecific. They were split into separate species based on the results of a genetic study published in 2007 that found that the white-cheeked antbird was more similar to the rufous-throated antbird than it was to the bicolored antbird.

The genus contains three species:

- Rufous-throated antbird, Gymnopithys rufigula
- Bicolored antbird, Gymnopithys bicolor
- White-cheeked antbird, Gymnopithys leucaspis

The genus previously included the white-throated antbird and the lunulated antbird but when a molecular phylogenetic study published in 2014 found that Gymnopithys was polyphyletic, these two species were moved to a new genus Oneillornis to create monophyletic genera.
