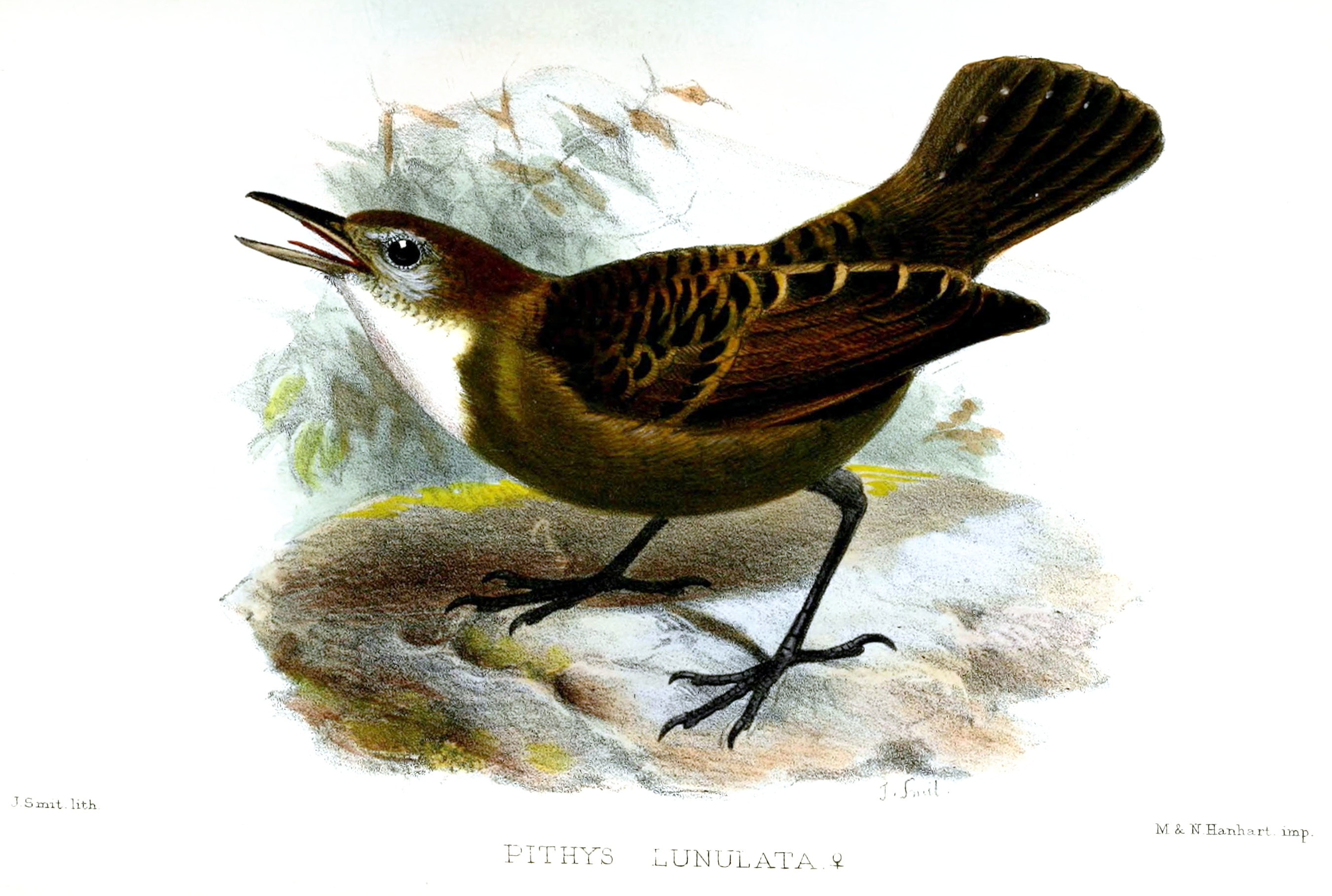
- Illustration of a female
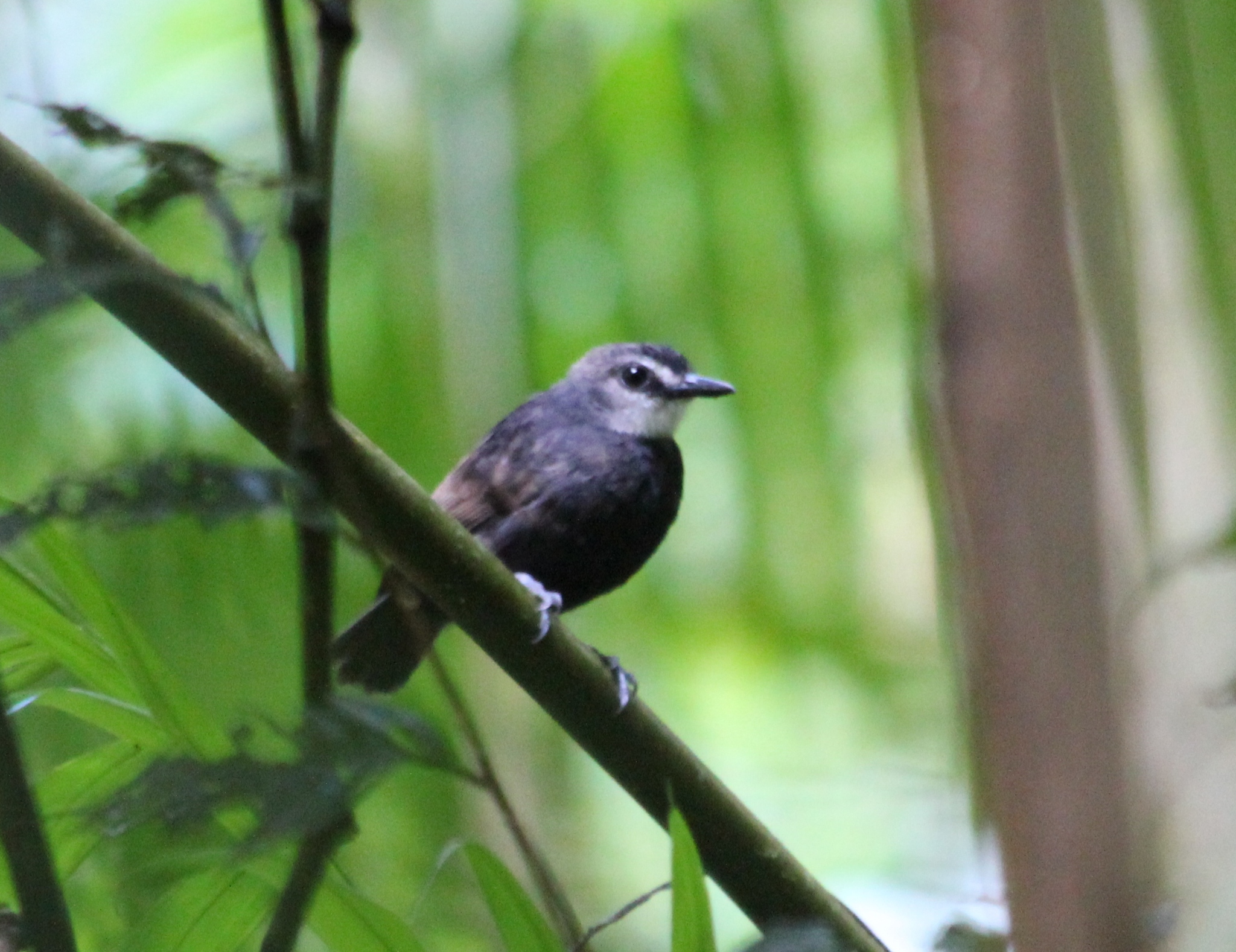

Conservation status
- Least Concern (IUCN 3.1)

Scientific classification
- Kingdom: Animalia
- Phylum: Chordata
- Class: Aves
- Order: Passeriformes
- Family: Thamnophilidae
- Genus: Oneillornis
- Species: O. lunulatus

Binomial name
- Oneillornis lunulatus (Sclater, PL & Salvin, 1873)

Synonyms
- Gymnopithys lunulatus

= Lunulated antbird =

Species of bird

The lunulated antbird (Oneillornis lunulatus) is a species of insectivorous bird in the subfamily Thamnophilinae of the family Thamnophilidae, the "typical antbirds". It is found in Ecuador and Peru.

== Taxonomy and systematics ==
The lunulated antbird was described and illustrated by the English ornithologists Philip Sclater and Osbert Salvin in 1873 and given the binomial name Pithys lunulatus. The species was subsequently included in the genus Gymnopithys. It was moved to a newly erected genus, Oneillornis, based on the results of a molecular phylogenetic study published in 2014. It shares the genus with the white-throated antbird (O. salvini), which has been treated as conspecific. The lunulated antbird is monotypic.

== Description ==
The lunulated antbird is 13 to 14.5 cm (5.1 to 5.7 in) long and weighs 22 to 26 g (0.78 to 0.92 oz). Adult males are mostly gray. They have a white supercilium, ear coverts, chin, and throat. Their tail is blackish gray. Adult females have a white supercilium, dark olive-brown lores, and a white chin and throat. Their crown and nape are yellowish olive-brown; their back and rump are yellowish olive-brown with blackish edges and light buff tips on the feathers. Their tail is dark grayish brown with some white barring. Their underparts are olive-brown, paler and yellower in the center of the breast. Juvenile males resemble adult females without the white supercilium and only patchy white on the throat.

== Distribution and habitat ==
The lunulated antbird is found in eastern Ecuador from Sucumbíos Province to Morona-Santiago Province and in northern and central Peru west of the Rio Napo and Rio Ucayali. It primarily inhabits humid várzea evergreen forest and the transitional forest between it and terra firme. It almost entirely remains in the forest undergrowth. In elevation, it occurs below 300 m (1,000 ft) in Ecuador but reaches 950 m (3,100 ft) locally in Peru.

== Behavior ==
=== Movement ===
The lunulated antbird is not known to migrate.

=== Feeding ===
The lunulated antbird is an obligate ant follower that feeds on various arthropods that flee from foraging army ant swarms, such as Eciton burchelli and the genus Labidus. It typically forages individually, in pairs, and in family groups, perching within about 1 m (3 ft) of the ground, though as high as 3 m (10 ft), and sallying or pouncing to the ground after prey. It is dominant over smaller antbirds but subordinate to larger species of other families, such as woodcreepers.

=== Breeding ===
The lunulated antbird's breeding season in Peru is thought to span from October to April; its season in Ecuador is not known. The clutch size is believed to be two eggs. Nothing else is known about the species' breeding biology.

=== Vocalization ===
The lunulated antbird's song is "a distinct introductory note followed by a fairly rapid, decelerating, rising-falling series of popping notes becoming rising mellow whistles" PEW pipi'pi'pwee-pwee-pwee-peeerr." Its calls include a "long and usually interrupted 'chirr' and [an] abrupt 'chup' ".

== Status ==
The IUCN has assessed the lunulated antbird as being of Least Concern. Its population size is not known and is believed to be decreasing. No immediate threats have been identified. It is considered "rare and local" in Ecuador and "rare to uncommon" in Peru. It occurs in several private preserves and a few federally protected areas. It is thought "to be of high sensitivity to human disturbance." "Although its habitat is at present relatively intact, much of [eastern] Ecuador has been opened up for oil exploration and drilling, and the road-building and subsequent human colonization and environmental degradation that inevitably follow could place this species at risk in the future."
