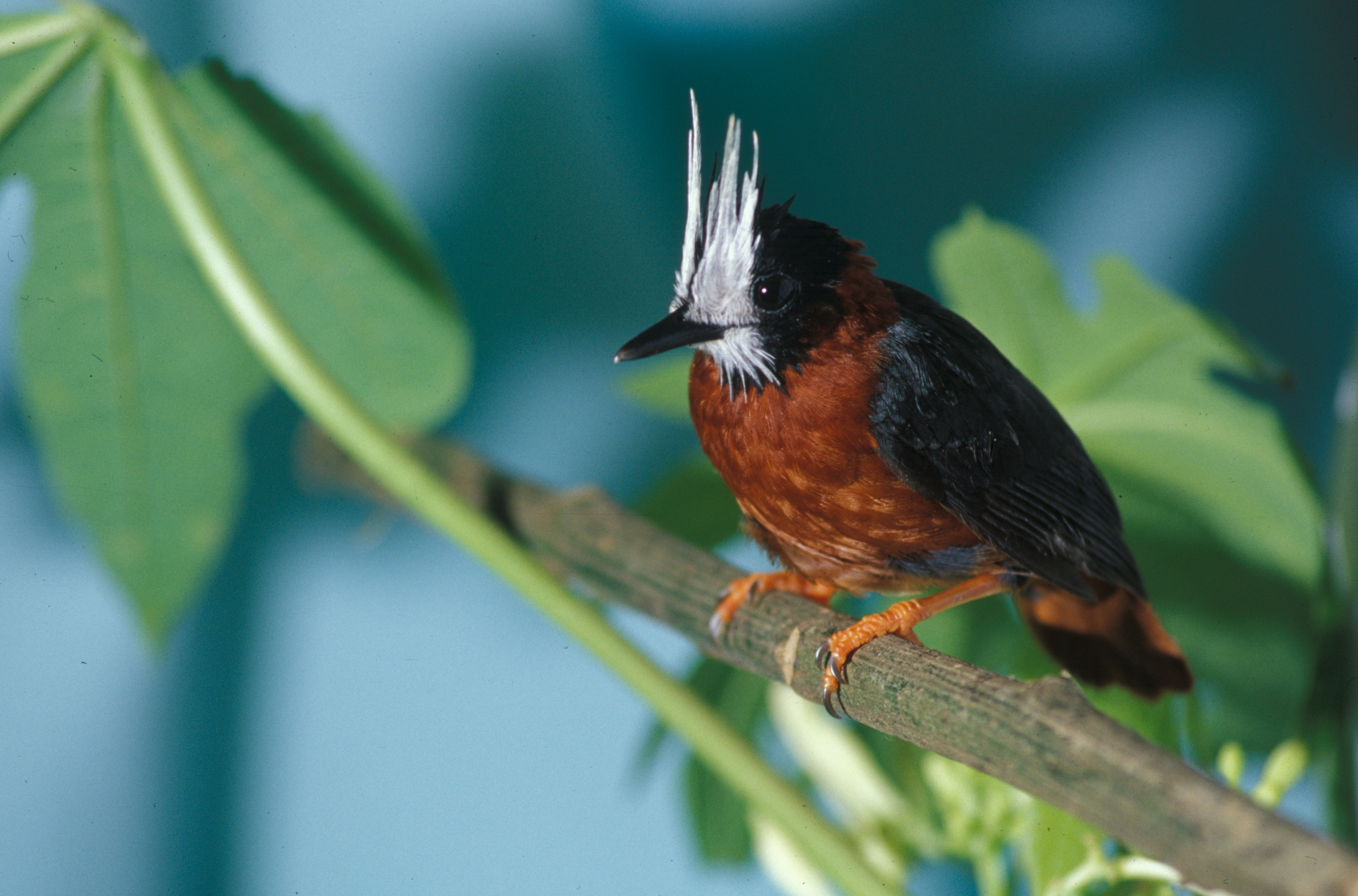

Conservation status
- Least Concern (IUCN 3.1)

Scientific classification
- Kingdom: Animalia
- Phylum: Chordata
- Class: Aves
- Order: Passeriformes
- Family: Thamnophilidae
- Genus: Pithys
- Species: P. albifrons

Binomial name
- Pithys albifrons (Linnaeus, 1766)

Synonyms
- Pipra albifrons Linnaeus, 1766

= White-plumed antbird =

Species of bird

The white-plumed antbird (Pithys albifrons) is a small species of insectivorous bird in subfamily Thamnophilinae of family Thamnophilidae, the "typical antbirds". It is found in Brazil, Colombia, Ecuador, French Guiana, Guyana, Peru, Suriname, and Venezuela.

== Taxonomy ==
The first formal description of the white-plumed antbird was by the Swedish naturalist Carl Linnaeus in 1766 in the twelfth edition of his Systema Naturae. He introduced the binomial name Pipra albifrons.

The white-plumed antbird has two subspecies, the nominate P. a. albifrons (Linnaeus, 1766) and P. a. peruvianus (Taczanowski, 1884). Some taxonomists have separated a third subspecies, P. a. brevibarba, from peruvianus but this treatment has found little acceptance. It shares genus Pithys with the white-masked antbird (P. castaneus). Pithys and Phaenostictus are sister genera, and the two may be distinguished by smaller length and weight, shorter tails, and louder songs in Pithys than Phaenostictus.

== Description ==
The white-plumed antbird is 11.5 to 12.5 cm (4.5 to 4.9 in) and weighs 18 to 23 g (0.63 to 0.81 oz). The species is monomorphic, meaning both sexes look the same. Adults of both subspecies have the eponymous white tufts on their forehead and chin. Their crown and the rest of their face are black; the nominate subspecies has a white stripe over and behind the eye. Their upperparts and wings are gray. Their nape, tail, and underparts are rufous-chestnut with a gray tinge on the flanks. Their feet and tarsus are bright orange. Their bill is about 1.16 cm (0.46 in) long and 0.47 cm (0.19 in) wide, indicative of its insect food source. Juvenile birds do not have the white plumes, postocular streak, and rufous-chestnut "collar" of adults, and their upperparts are browner and underparts grayer.

The white-plumed antbird uses a complex basic molt strategy, meaning that the juvenile performs a preliminary molt before it molts into its characteristic adult feathers. This first molt occurs soon after they begin to feed themselves. As adults, they perform at most one molt a year and plumage remains unchanging. A complete wing molt is quite variable, slow and irregular, especially in breeding birds. The molt takes approximately 301 days to complete, thus there can only be a single annual molt. molts may not occur annually and can start at any time of year.

== Distribution and habitat ==
The nominate subspecies of the white-plumed antbird is found in the southern Venezuelan states of Bolívar and Amazonas, east through the Guianas, and in Brazil east of the Rio Negro and north of the Amazon to the Atlantic in Amapá state. Subspecies P. a. peruvianus is found from extreme western Venezuela south through eastern Colombia, Brazil west of the Rio Negro, and eastern Ecuador into northern and central Peru. In Peru it occurs north of the Amazon and Maranon rivers and along the base of the Andes south to the Department of Ayacucho. The species inhabits the understorey of terra firme evergreen forest in the lowlands and foothills and also adjacent mature secondary forest. It occurs in higher abundance in forests with high canopies, high vegetation complexity, and many plant species. In elevation it occurs up to 1,350 m (4,400 ft) in Brazil, to 2,250 m (7,400 ft) on Cerro Duida in Venezuela, and to 1,100 m (3,600 ft) in Colombia and Ecuador. They show higher survival in the eastern Amazon rainforest than in the western.

Each pair occupies a home range exceeding 200 ha (490 acres) in order to ensure that swarms of army ants to follow to food can be found at all times. The species generally shuns open landscapes and will not cross rivers. They have, however, been found crossing roads to get from one patch of forest to another.

== Behavior ==
White-plumed antbirds are very persistent in holding on to territories and may remain even in case of conflict with other individuals, if enough food sources are available. They are generally solitary outside of the breeding season and will tend to follow individual ant swarms through the forest. Like other antbirds, they perform anting, which is the process of brushing small insects through their wing and tail feathers. It is still unknown whether the main function of this process is to ease irritation during molting, kill mites, or detoxify distasteful insects.

=== Diet ===
The white-plumed antbird is an insectivore that eats insects, arthropods, and at times lizards. It typically forages within 1 m (3 ft) of the ground but will feed up to 1 m (3 ft) above it. It seldom joins mixed-species feeding flocks. It is an obligate antbird, feeding almost entirely on prey disturbed by army ants swarms. As many as 20 individuals have been noted following a swarm.

=== Alarm behavior ===
While foraging, white-plumed antbirds may remain immobile for long periods of time so that they will not be attacked by larger antbirds or predators. In case of confrontation or alarm, they may "panic, flee and chip" instead. This reaction to danger involves the bird darting back and forth making chipping noises, spreading its tail and flicking rapidly to find their last prey items before fleeing. In reaction to human presence, the bird tends to make a chirring sound and mob the intruder.

=== Reproduction ===
The courtship of white-plumed antbirds is essentially the same as in other antbirds. Courtship involves the male feeding the female, mutual grooming and the male showing the female possible nest sites, a display known as "draping". Both the female and male help build the nest. White-plumed antbirds typically build their bottom-supported cup nests atop live vegetation such as small palms, sedges and tuberous plants. Although the plant chosen is alive, it will often have a mat of dead leaves at the crown. The nest is built sunken into these dead leaves to hide it from predators. The nests themselves are composed of dark-colored fibrous rootlets (inner lining) and dead leaves (outer layers). Typically two eggs are laid per clutch. The eggs have a rosy-white base color with many longitudinal rosy-brown flecks and a few rosy hairline markings covering the surface. After hatching, each fledgling is fed for about a month. In certain locations, such as Manaus, they breed for much of the year and females are known to leave their mate (caring for their offspring) in order to start a new nest with a new mate as quickly as possible.

=== Vocalization ===
This species has 11 different calls (described in detail by Willis (1981)), 8 of which are similar to another species (the Bicolored Antbird) and 3 that are fairly unusual. They have a loud, structurally complex and unique, whistling song. This song is used between mates and young separated by vegetation and individuals searching for ants. An adult may also sing three or more short soft tweeting notes ("see-see-see") when searching for a young or a mate, followed by "beie, beie, beie" if they do not appear quickly. Their other calls are typically quieter and shorter than those of other species of antbird. Several of their calls are used for agonistic behavior and as predation warnings. There are two main calls with the latter function, one that is very high and thin because it is hard to locate the source of such sounds, and a kind of buzzing (aimed mostly at ground predators and humans) that mimics the lower warning growls of carnivores.

== Status ==
The IUCN has assessed the white-plumed antbird as being of Least Concern. It has a very large range, and though its population size is not known it is believed to be stable. No immediate threats have been identified. It is considered abundant throughout its range and occurs in many protected areas. In addition, its range "encompasses extensive intact habitat which, while not formally protected, seems at little risk of being developed in near future [and it] appears to survive in partially logged forest, although not in small forest fragments."
