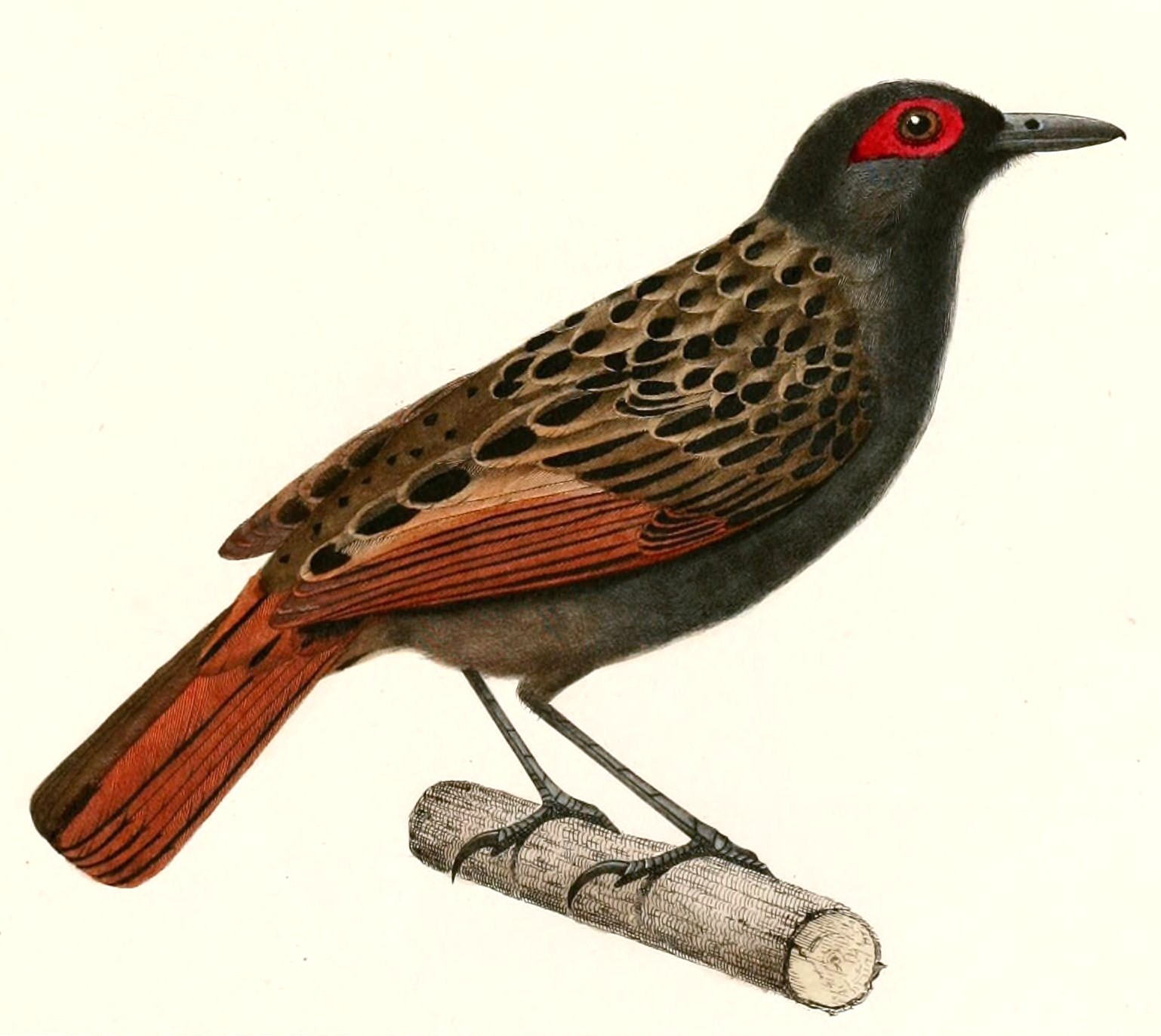
- Black-spotted bare-eye (Phlegopsis nigromaculata)

Scientific classification
- Kingdom: Animalia
- Phylum: Chordata
- Class: Aves
- Order: Passeriformes
- Family: Thamnophilidae
- Genus: Phlegopsis; Reichenbach, 1850

Type species
- Myiothera nigromaculata d'Orbigny & Lafresnaye, 1837

= Phlegopsis =

Genus of birds

Phlegopsis is a genus of insectivorous passerine birds in the antbird family, Thamnophilidae. They are known as "bare-eyes", which is a reference to a colourful bare patch of skin around their eyes. They are restricted to humid forest in the Amazon of South America. They are among the largest ant-followers in the family and are only rarely seen away from ant swarms.

== Taxonomy ==
The pale-faced bare-eye, sometimes known as the pale-faced antbird, has often been placed in the monotypic genus Skutchia, but based on genetic evidence it should be placed in Phlegopsis, and this treatment was adopted by the SACC in 2010. Based on a single specimen a fourth species, the Argus bare-eye (P. barringeri) has been proposed, but it is a hybrid between P. erythroptera and P. nigromaculata.

The genus contains three species:

- Reddish-winged bare-eye (Phlegopsis erythroptera)
- Black-spotted bare-eye (Phlegopsis nigromaculata)
- Pale-faced bare-eye (Phlegopsis borbae)
