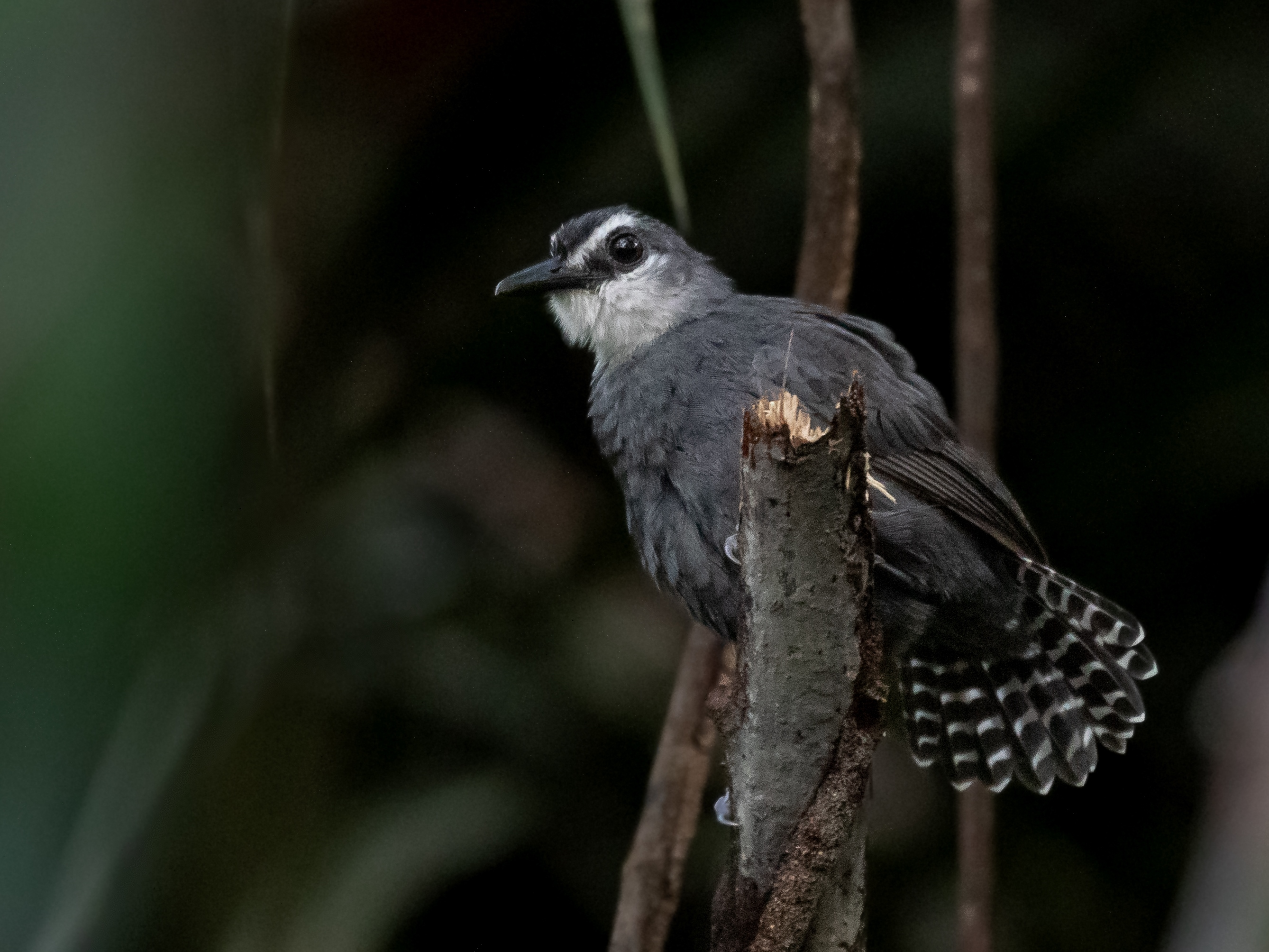
- Oneillornis salvini

Scientific classification
- Domain: Eukaryota
- Kingdom: Animalia
- Phylum: Chordata
- Class: Aves
- Order: Passeriformes
- Family: Thamnophilidae
- Genus: Oneillornis; Isler, Bravo & Brumfield, 2014

= Oneillornis =

Genus of birds

Oneillornis is a genus of passerine birds in the family Thamnophilidae. The species are native to the Amazon rainforest of South America.

The genus contains two species:

- White-throated antbird (Oneillornis salvini)
- Lunulated antbird (Oneillornis lunulatus)

These two species were at one time included in the genus Gymnopithys. They were moved to this newly erected genus based on the results of a molecular phylogenetic study published in 2014. The type species is the lunulated antbird.

These species are specialist ant-followers that depend on swarms of army ants to flush insects and other arthropods out of the leaf litter.
