= White-masked antbird =

Conservation status
- Near Threatened (IUCN 3.1)

Scientific classification
- Kingdom: Animalia
- Phylum: Chordata
- Class: Aves
- Order: Passeriformes
- Family: Thamnophilidae
- Genus: Pithys
- Species: P. castaneus

Binomial name
- Pithys castaneus Berlioz, 1938

Synonyms
- Pithys castanea

Species of bird

The white-masked antbird (Pithys castaneus) is a Near Threatened species of bird in subfamily Thamnophilinae of family Thamnophilidae, the "typical antbirds". It is endemic to Peru.

== Taxonomy and systematics ==
The white-masked antbird was known only from its type specimen from its discovery in 1937 until 2001 when its status as a species was confirmed. It had been suggested instead to be a hybrid of two antbird species. It shares genus Pithys with the white-plumed antbird (P. albifrons). It has no subspecies.

== Description ==
The white-masked antbird is about 14 cm (5.5 in) long. The sexes are alike. Adults are mostly bright rufous chestnut. Their crown, nape, lower ear coverts, and the sides of their throat are black. Their lores, a wide area around their eye, their chin, and their throat are white. Juveniles are a duller rufous chestnut, with less white on the face and with sooty brown replacing the adult's black on the head. Adults have a brown or dark brown iris and brownish orange or ochre orange legs and feet. Juveniles' iris is dark gray and their legs and feet gray-tinged dirty yellow. All ages have a blackish slate bill with silvery white cutting edges.

== Distribution and habitat ==
The white-masked antbird is found in northern Peru in a small area from northeastern Amazonas Department into western Loreto. It inhabits a type of stunted forest called varillal that grows on white sand soil. Its floor typically has a thick layer of humus and dead leaves, and the trees reach a height of about 30 m (100 ft). All of the known sites are below an elevation of 300 m (1,000 ft).

== Behavior ==
=== Movement ===
The white-masked antbird is not known to migrate.

=== Feeding ===
The white-masked antbird is an obligate ant follower that feeds on arthropods that flee foraging army ant swarms. It typically forages near the front of the ant swarm, sallying or dropping to the ground from a low perch. Up to four have been observed at a swarm.

=== Breeding ===
Juvenile white-masked antbirds have been observed in July but nothing else is known about the species' breeding biology.

=== Vocalization ===
The white-masked antbird's song is "a rising, whiny whistled huuuuuureee? with short, quiet, chiming tur'e'e notes often interspersed between whistles". Its calls include "a quiet, descending, mewed whew, a harsh, descending t'char...a sharp tchip! [and] a low, barely descending, harsh grrah".

== Status ==
The IUCN originally in 1994 assessed the white-masked antbird as Data Deficient and since 2008 as Near Threatened. It is known from only a few sites within a very limited range and its estimated population of between 1500 and 7000 mature individuals is believed to be decreasing. "Rates of habitat loss within its known range are poorly known, but its habitat has been damaged by the construction of an oil pipeline, and several roads are planned. Obligate ant-followers are usually some of the first species to be lost from fragmented forests so this species is likely to be declining due to these pressures."
