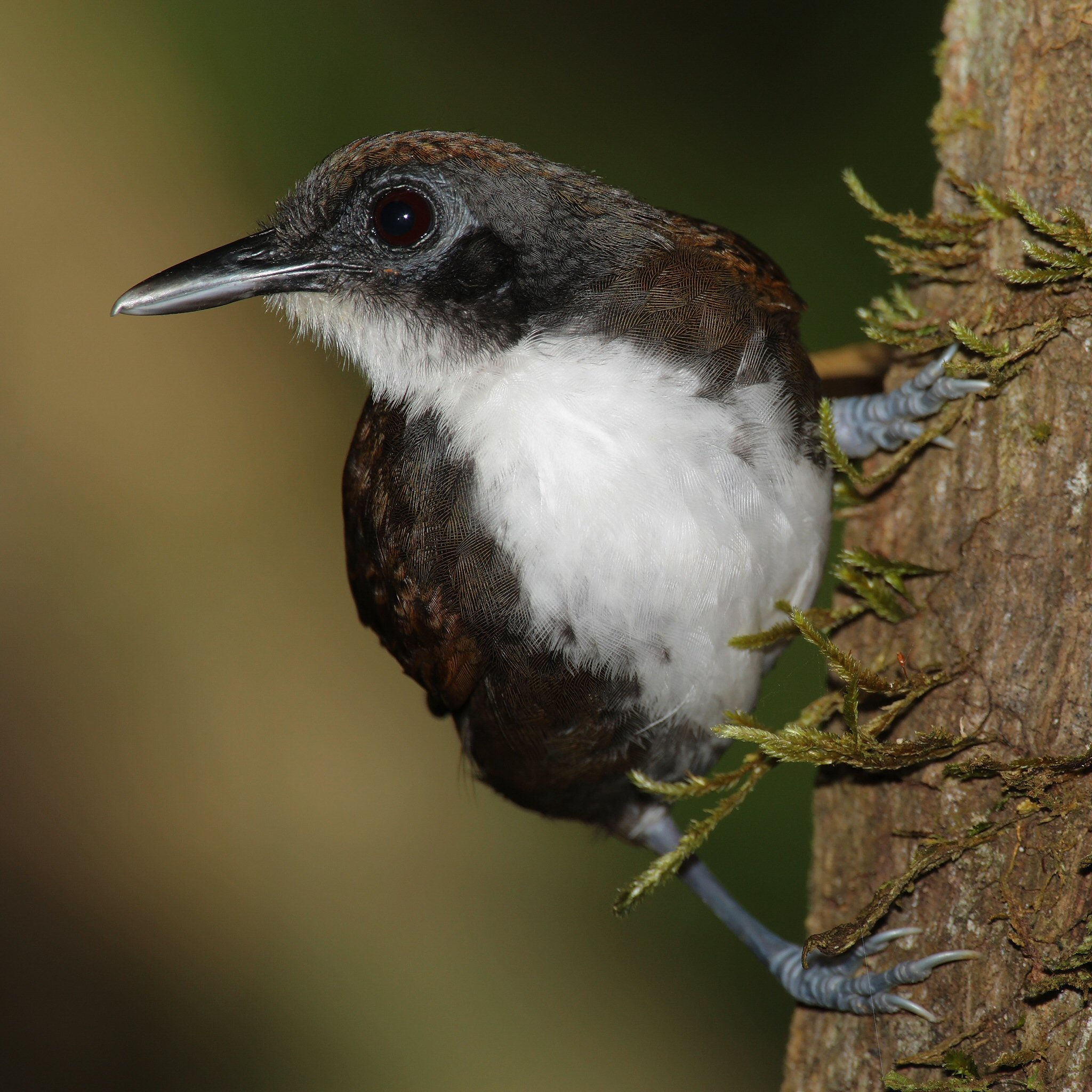

Conservation status
- Least Concern (IUCN 3.1)

Scientific classification
- Kingdom: Animalia
- Phylum: Chordata
- Class: Aves
- Order: Passeriformes
- Family: Thamnophilidae
- Genus: Gymnopithys
- Species: G. bicolor

Binomial name
- Gymnopithys bicolor (Lawrence, 1863)

Synonyms
- Gymnopithys leucaspis bicolor

= Bicolored antbird =

Species of bird

The bicolored antbird (Gymnopithys bicolor) is a species of bird in subfamily Thamnophilinae of family Thamnophilidae, the "typical antbirds". It is found in Colombia, Costa Rica, Ecuador, Honduras, Nicaragua, and Panama.

== Taxonomy and systematics ==
What is now the bicolored antbird was originally described as Myrmeciza leucaspis and included what is now the white-cheeked antbird (now Gymnopithys leucaspis). The current bicolored antbird was described as a separate taxon by the American amateur ornithologist George Newbold Lawrence in 1863 and given the binomial name Pithys bicolor. The two were split into separate species based on the results of a genetic study published in 2007 that found that the white-cheeked antbird was more similar to the rufous-throated antbird (G. rufigula) than it was to the bicolored antbird. These three antbirds are the only members of genus Gymnopithys.

The bicolored antbird has these five subspecies:

- G. b. olivascens (Ridgway, 1891)
- G. b. bicolor (Lawrence, 1863)
- G. b. daguae Hellmayr, 1906
- G. b. aequatorialis (Hellmayr, 1902)
- G. b. ruficeps Salvin & Godman, 1892

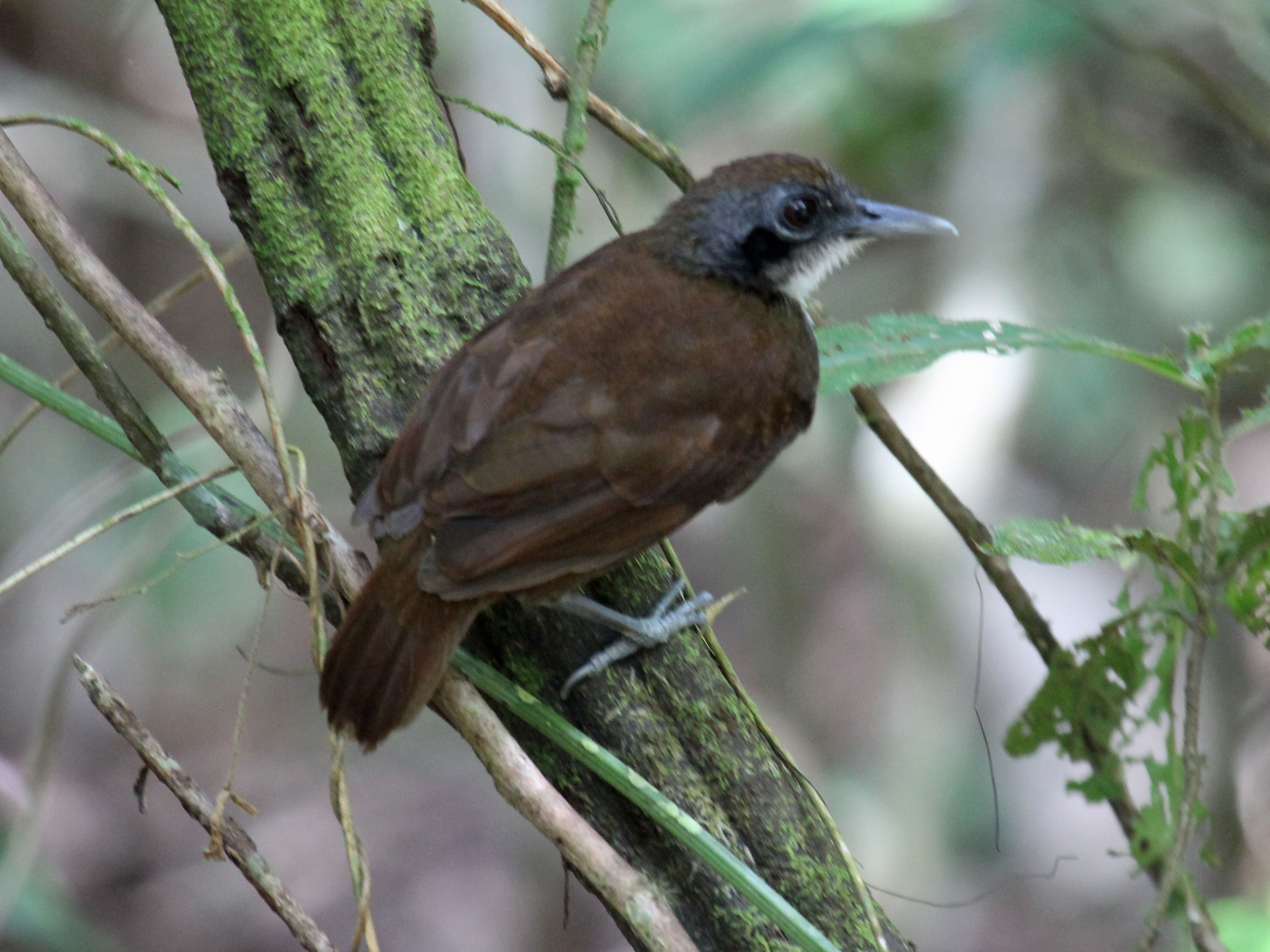
Soberania National Park, Panama

== Description ==
The bicolored antbird is 13.5 to 15 cm (5.3 to 5.9 in) long and weighs 28 to 37 g (0.99 to 1.3 oz). The sexes are the same. Adults of the nominate subspecies G. b. bicolor have a brownish chestnut crown and nape. They have bare blue-gray skin around the eye, a gray forehead, a broad gray band behind the eye, and black cheeks. Their back, rump, wings, and tail are brownish chestnut. Their throat and breast are white with a brown band from their cheek along their flanks.

Subspecies G. b. olivascens of the bicolored antbird is much like the nominate but is dull brown behind the eye rather than gray. G. b. daguae is like a darker olivascens. G. b. aequatorialis is darker still, with a rufous forehead and blacker sides. G. b. ruficeps has a brighter rufous forehead and crown than aequatorialis, is blacker behind the eye, and has a darker reddish back and redder sides.

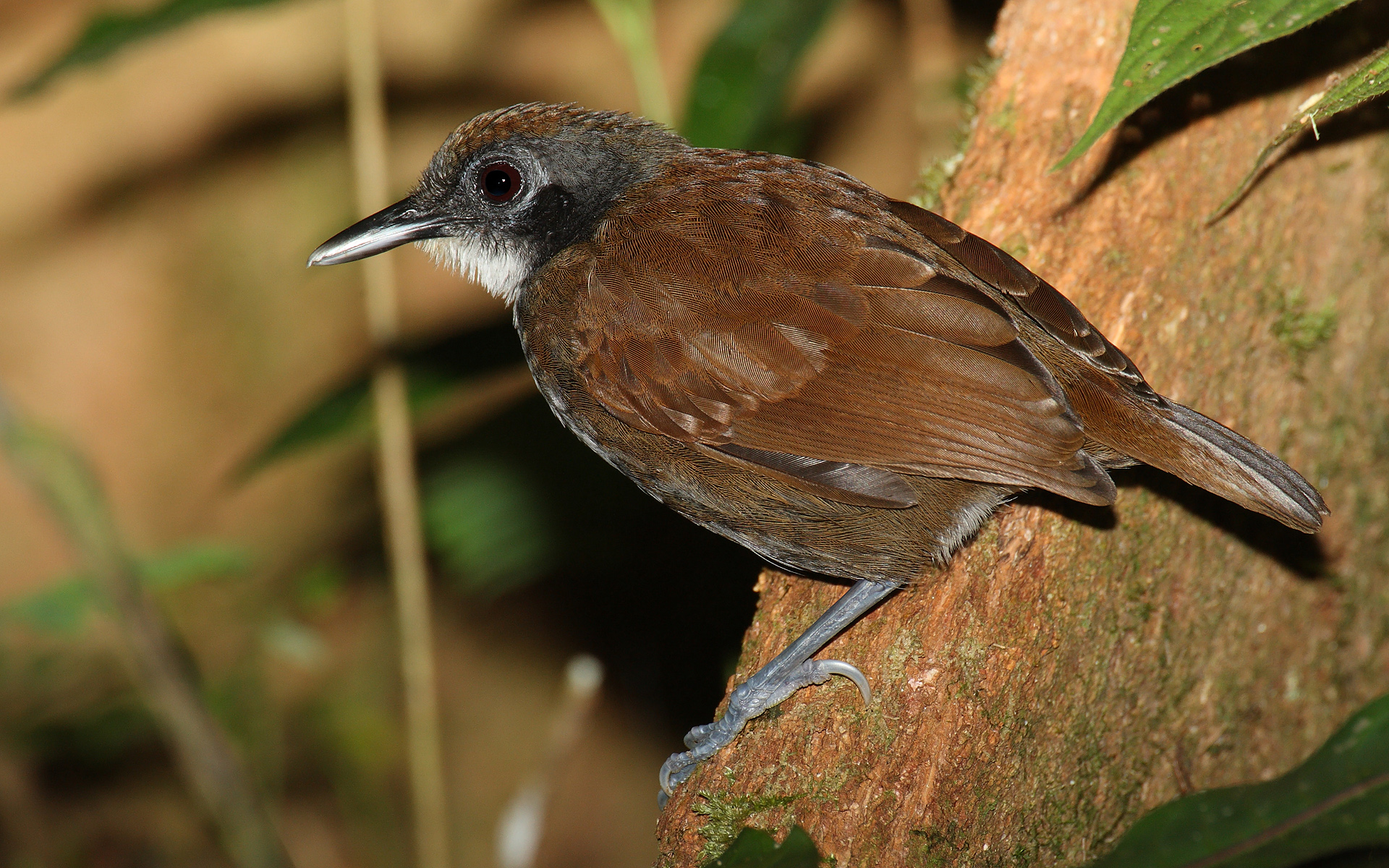
Parque Nacional Darién, Panama

== Distribution and habitat ==
The subspecies of the bicolored antbird are found thus:

- G. b. olivascens: Caribbean slope of Honduras and Nicaragua through Costa Rica on the Caribbean and Pacific slopes into western Panama
- G. b. bicolor: central and eastern Panama into the Pacific slope of northwestern Colombia's Chocó Department
- G. b. daguae: Pacific slope of western Colombia from Chocó south to Cauca Department
- G. b. aequatorialis: Pacific slope of extreme southwestern Colombia into western Ecuador as far as Azuay Province
- G. b. ruficeps: Andes of northern Colombia between Antioquia and Cesar departments and south in the Magdalena Valley to Boyacá Department

The bicolored antbird primarily inhabits lowland and foothill terra firme evergreen forest and nearby mature secondary forest. It almost entirely remains in the forest undergrowth. In elevation it reaches 1,750 m (5,700 ft) in parts of Central America though only 1,600 m (5,200 ft) in Costa Rica and 1,500 m (4,900 ft) in Panama. In Colombia it occurs below 1,000 m (3,300 ft) and in Ecuador below 750 m (2,500 ft).

== Behavior ==
=== Movement ===
The bicolored antbird is not known to migrate.

=== Feeding ===
The bicolored antbird is an obligate ant follower that feeds on a wide variety of arthropods that flee foraging army ant swarms. It typically forages individually, in pairs, and in family groups, perching within about 1 m (3 ft) of the ground though as high as 5 m (16 ft), and sallying or pouncing to the ground after prey. Up to a dozen birds have been noted at a swarm. It is dominant over smaller antbirds but subordinate to larger species of other families such as woodcreepers.

=== Breeding ===
The bicolored antbird breeds mostly between April and September in Costa Rica and from April to December in Panama; its seasons elsewhere are not known. The species is monogamous. Its known nests are cups made from dead palm and other leaves, often with a lining of fungal rhizomorphs. The nest is often placed into a cavity in the top of a stump. The clutch is usually two eggs that are streaked reddish brown on a white or creamy background. Females alone incubate at night and both parents during the day. The incubation period is about 15 to 16 days and fledging occurs 13 to 15 days after hatch.

=== Vocalization ===
The bicolored antbird's primary song is "a series of high notes which increase in pitch and pace, then slow down and descend". Its calls are essentially the same as those of the white-cheeked antbird and include a "harsh, vibrant 'chirr'...diminishing slightly in pitch and intensity, and abrupt 'chup' notes, usually doubled but also in groups of 3–4".

== Status ==
The IUCN did not recognize the bicolored antbird until 2016, when it was assessed as being of Least Concern. It has a very large range; its population size is not known and is believed to be decreasing. No immediate threats have been identified. It is considered fairly common across its range. It occurs in many protected areas, both governmental and private, and its range "encompasses extensive intact habitat which is not formally protected, but is still at low risk of development in immediate future". However, "local populations in Honduras, Nicaragua and parts of Costa Rica and Panama have declined or disappeared as entire regions have been cleared for human settlement and agriculture".
