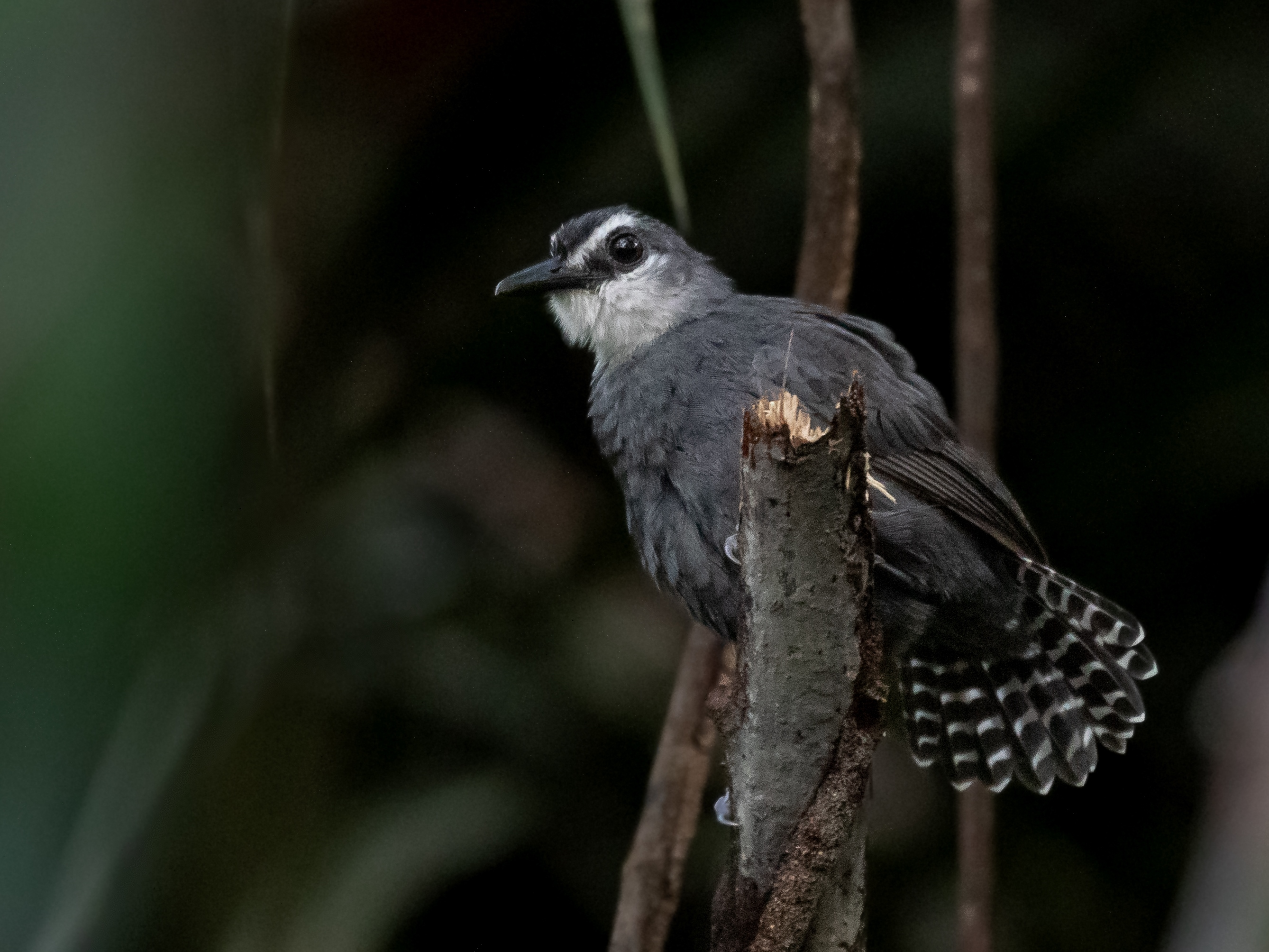
- A male at Careiro, Amazonas, Brazil
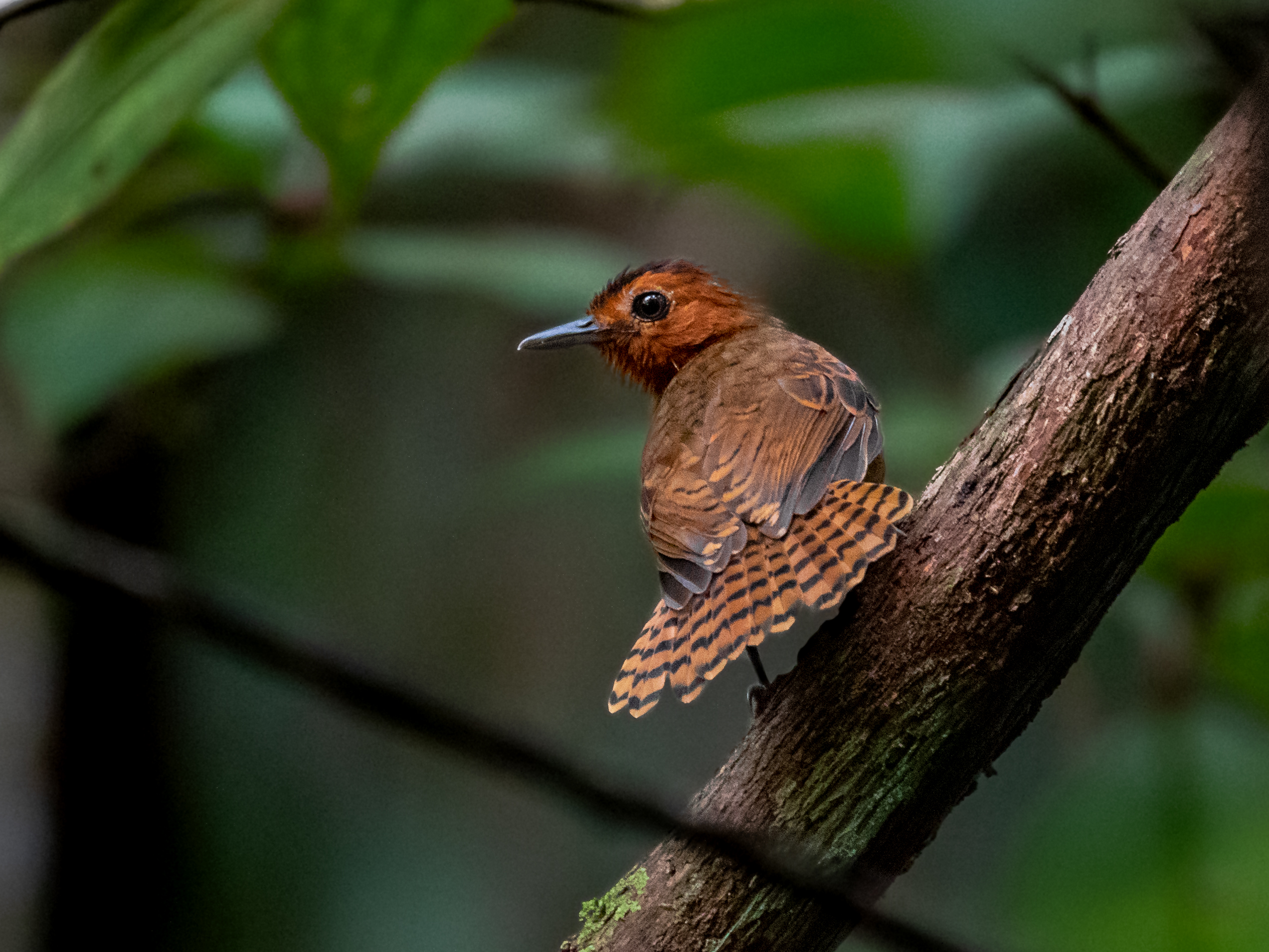
- A female at the same locality

Conservation status
- Least Concern (IUCN 3.1)

Scientific classification
- Kingdom: Animalia
- Phylum: Chordata
- Class: Aves
- Order: Passeriformes
- Family: Thamnophilidae
- Genus: Oneillornis
- Species: O. salvini

Binomial name
- Oneillornis salvini (Berlepsch, 1901)

Synonyms
- Gymnopithys salvini

= White-throated antbird =

Species of bird

The white-throated antbird (Oneillornis salvini) is a species of bird in subfamily Thamnophilinae of family Thamnophilidae, the "typical antbirds". It is found in Bolivia, Brazil and Peru.

== Taxonomy and systematics ==
The white-throated antbird was described by the German ornithologist Hans von Berlepsch in 1901 and given the binomial name Pithys salvini. It was subsequently included in the genus Gymnopithys until moved to the newly erected genus Oneillornis based on the results of a molecular phylogenetic study published in 2014. It shares the genus with the lunulated antbird (O. lunulatus) with which it has been treated as conspecific. The white-throated antbird is monotypic.

== Description ==
The white-throated antbird is 13 to 14.5 cm (5.1 to 5.7 in) long and weighs 22 to 28 g (0.78 to 0.99 oz). Adult males are mostly gray. They have a white supercilium, ear coverts, chin, and throat. Their wings are a darker gray than their back and their tail is barred with blackish gray and white. Adult females have a dark olive-brown center of their crown. Their nape, sides of the head, throat, and upper breast are rufous. Their upper back is olive-brown, the rest of their back is barred with black and rufous, and their rump is reddish yellow-brown. Their flight feathers are mostly rufous and their wing coverts brown with rufous edges. Their tail is rufous with thin black bars. Their lower breast and belly are reddish yellow-brown and their flanks olive-brown. Females in the northern part of the species' range are darker and have heavier bars on their upperparts than in the south but the differences are clinal. Subadult males are dark gray with brown wings and a patchy white throat.

== Distribution and habitat ==
The white-throated antbird is a bird of the western Amazon Basin. It is found in eastern Peru east of the Rio Ucayali between the Amazon in the north and the Rio Madre de Dios in the south, in southwestern Brazil east to the Rio Madeira and south to Acre state, and in northwestern and central Bolivia to Cochabamba Department. It primarily inhabits humid terra firme evergreen forest and to a lesser extent seasonally flooded forest and the transition zone between the two types. It almost entirely remains in the forest undergrowth. In elevation it occurs below 450 m (1,500 ft) in Brazil but reaches 800 m (2,600 ft) in Peru.

== Behavior ==
=== Movement ===
The white-throated antbird is not known to migrate.

=== Feeding ===
The white-throated antbird is an obligate ant follower that feeds on a wide variety of arthropods that flee foraging army ant swarms, such as those of Eciton burchelli and genus Labidus. It typically forages individually, in pairs, and in family groups, perching within about 1 m (3 ft) of the ground though as high as 3 m (10 ft), and sallying or pouncing to the ground after prey. It is dominant over smaller antbirds but subordinate to larger species of other families such as woodcreepers.

=== Breeding ===
The white-throated antbird's nesting season has not been detailed but includes at least November in Peru and March in Brazil. Two known nests were made of dried palm frond pieces. One was a cup placed in the hollow atop a palm stump, the other was flatter and placed in a small patch of Heliconia plants. Their clutch size was two eggs which were light pink with maroon speckles. The incubation period, time to fledging, and details of parental care are not known.

=== Vocalization ===
One author described the white-throated antbird's song as a "slow, resounding series of 3-4 descending, long, upslurred 'weeih' notes". Another wrote it as "RHEEE?-rheee?-rheee?-rheee?-rhrrrr". Its calls include "a puttering, descending rattle and a rich tchup".

== Status ==
The IUCN has assessed the white-throated antbird as being of Least Concern. It has a large range; its population size is not known and is believed to be decreasing. No immediate threats have been identified. It is considered fairly common in much of its range but "generally uncommon" in Peru. It occurs in several protected areas and its range also includes "extensive areas of intact habitat, particularly in [the] Brazilian part of range, which are unprotected but appear to be at little near-term risk of development". However, it is thought "to be of high sensitivity to human disturbance".
