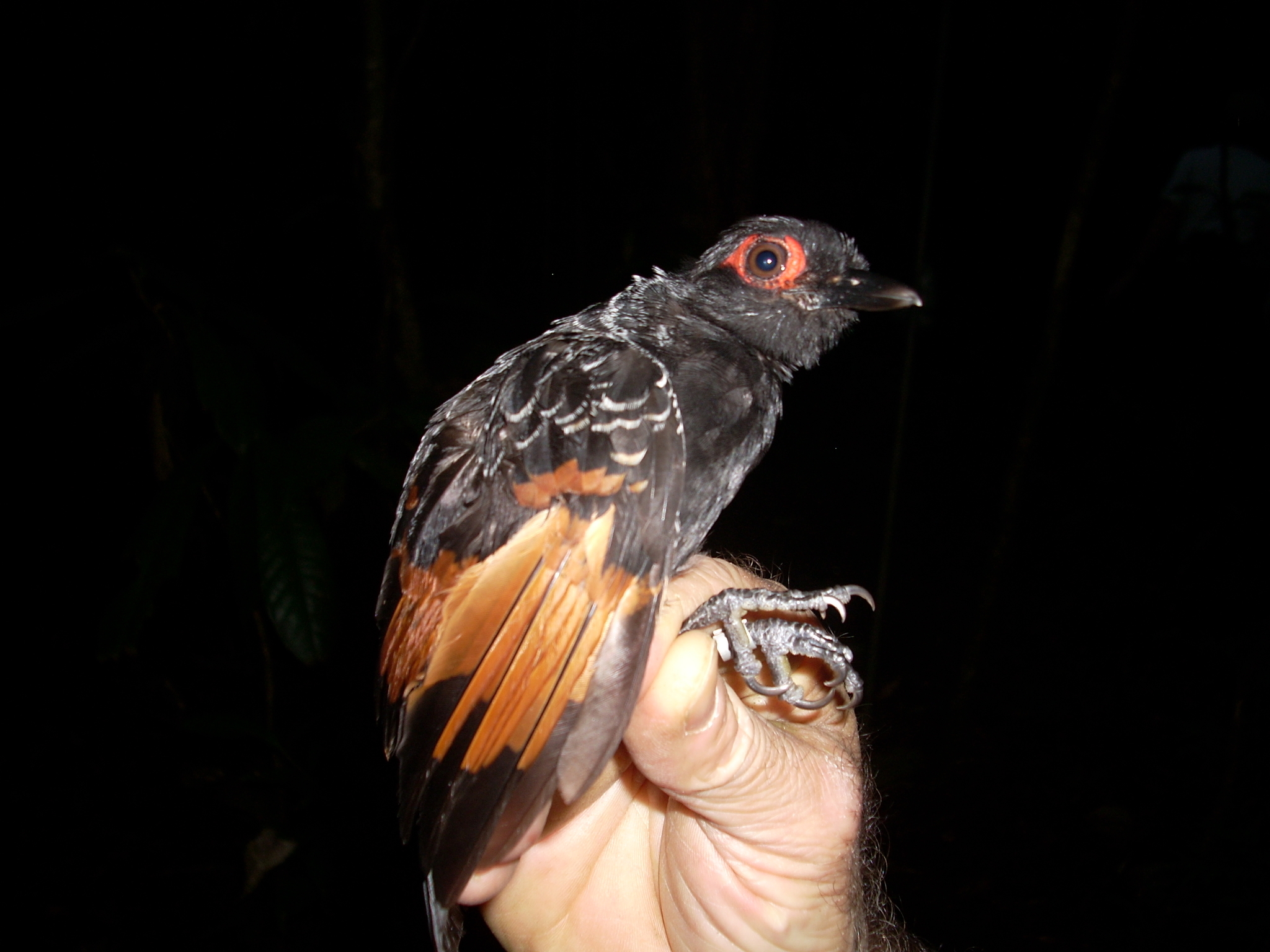
- Male

Conservation status
- Least Concern (IUCN 3.1)

Scientific classification
- Kingdom: Animalia
- Phylum: Chordata
- Class: Aves
- Order: Passeriformes
- Family: Thamnophilidae
- Genus: Phlegopsis
- Species: P. erythroptera

Binomial name
- Phlegopsis erythroptera (Gould, 1855)

= Reddish-winged bare-eye =

Species of bird

The reddish-winged bare-eye (Phlegopsis erythroptera) is a species of insectivorous passerine bird in subfamily Thamnophilinae of family Thamnophilidae, the "typical antbirds". It is native to the Amazon rainforest.

== Taxonomy and systematics ==
The reddish-winged bare-eye was described by the English bird artist and ornithologist John Gould in 1855 and given the binomial name Formicarius erythroptera. It has two subspecies, the nominate P. e. erythroptera (Gould, 1855) and P. e. ustulata (Todd, 1927).

== Description ==
The reddish-winged bare-eye is 17 to 18.5 cm (6.7 to 7.3 in) long and weighs 50 to 58 g (1.8 to 2.0 oz). Both sexes have a large ring of bare red skin around the eye. Adult males of the nominate subspecies are mostly black. They have white edges on the feathers of their upperparts and lesser wing coverts. Their median and greater wing coverts have wide rufous tips and their flight feathers have rufous bases. The tips of their uppertail coverts are dark reddish brown. Adult females have a very dark reddish brown crown, upperparts, and wing coverts with white tips on the coverts. Their flight feathers are blackish brown with white tips on the tertials; their tail is blackish brown with a pale band across it. The center of their throat is tawny-tinged white. Their face to the center of their belly are rufous and their flanks and vent area are rufous-brown. Subadult males have the same pattern as adults but are grayer and have a rufous tinge. The feathers of their back have wide cinnamon-rufous edges; their greater wing coverts and the bases of their flight feathers are also cinnamon-rufous. Males of subspecies P. e. ustulata have completely black uppertail coverts but are otherwise like the nominate. Females have pale buff tips on their wing coverts.

== Distribution and habitat ==
The nominate subspecies of the reddish-winged bare-eye is found from southeastern Colombia and southwestern Venezuela south through eastern Ecuador into northeastern Peru. From there its range extends east through northwestern Brazil to the Rio Negro. Subspecies P. e. ustulata is found in eastern Peru, extreme northwestern Bolivia, and southwestern Amazonian Brazil east to the Rio Madeira. The species primarily inhabits the understorey of humid terra firme evergreen forest. Along the upper Rio Negro it also occurs in stunted woodlands growing on white sand soils. In elevation it occurs below 550 m (1,800 ft) in most of its range but reaches 750 m (2,500 ft) in Ecuador and 600 m (2,000 ft) in Colombia.

== Behavior ==
=== Movement ===
The reddish-winged bare-eye is believed to be a year-round resident throughout its range.

=== Feeding ===
The reddish-winged bare-eye is an obligate ant follower that feeds on a variety of arthropods that flee foraging army ant swarms, primarily those of Eciton burchelli. It typically forages individually, in pairs, and in family groups, perching within about 1 m (3 ft) of the ground (though sometimes as high as 3 m (10 ft)) and sallying or pouncing to the ground after prey. It occasionally makes short aerial sallies and also flips leaves on the ground to find prey. Several pairs or family groups may attend an ant swarm but sometimes members of a pair follow different swarms. It is dominant over most other ant followers.

=== Breeding ===
The reddish-winged bare-eye's nesting season is not known. It appears to span October to June in Ecuador and include January in Colombia. Nothing else is known about the species' breeding biology.

=== Vocalization ===
The reddish-winged bare-eye's song is a "series of 4-7 descending, well-separated, shrill notes". It has been written as "rrr RHEEEW-rheeew rheeew rhew rhhw". Its calls include an "abrupt 'chip' " and a short "sharply downslurred 'chirr' ".

== Status ==
The IUCN has assessed the reddish-winged bare-eye as being of Least Concern. It has a very large range; its population size is not known and is believed to be decreasing. No immediate threats have been identified. It is considered generally uncommon, "scarce" in Ecuador, and "rare to uncommon" in Peru. It occurs in a few large protected areas and also in "extensive areas of intact habitat that are not formally protected, but appear to be at little risk of being developed in near future". It is thought to be highly sensitive to human disturbance.
