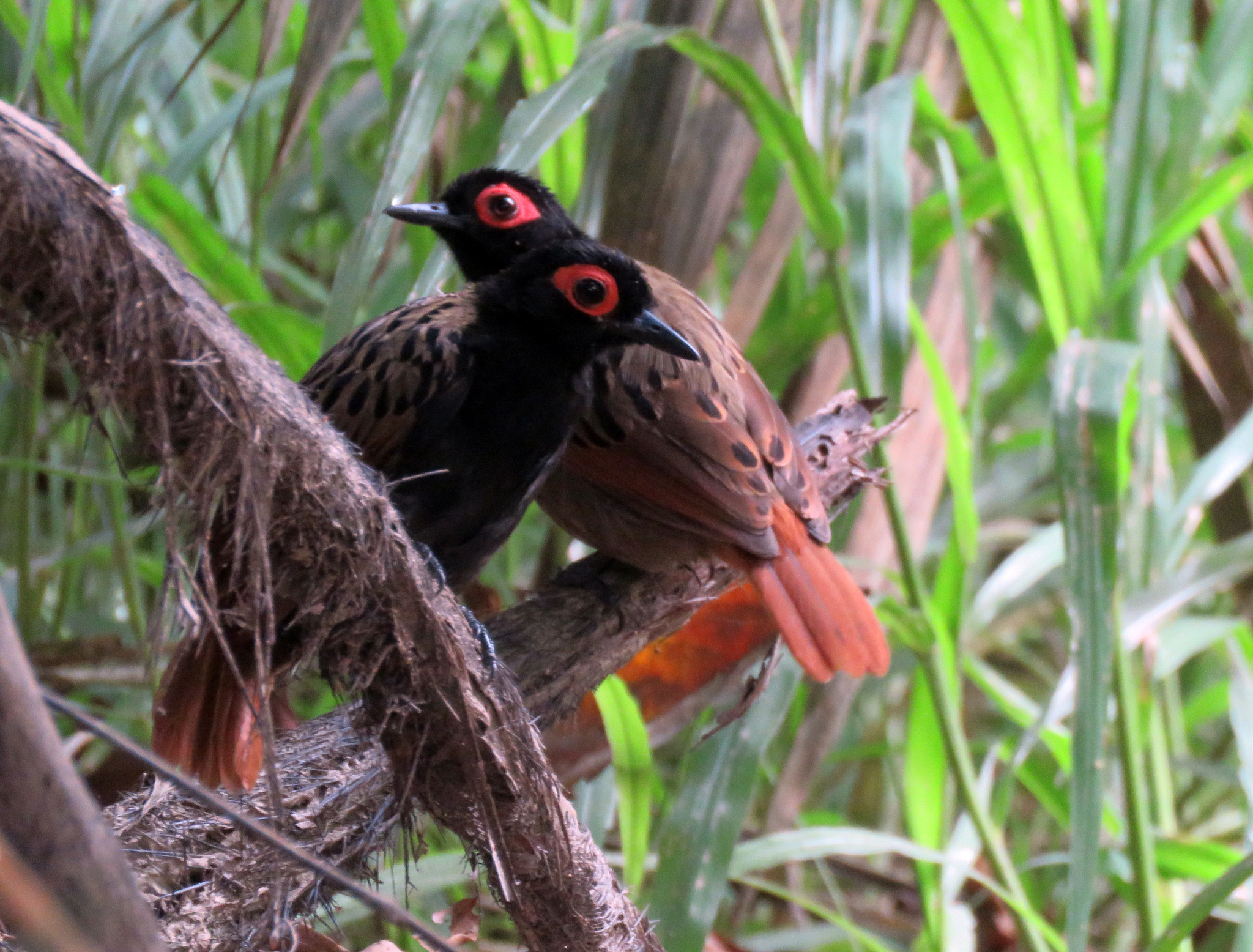

Conservation status
- Least Concern (IUCN 3.1)

Scientific classification
- Kingdom: Animalia
- Phylum: Chordata
- Class: Aves
- Order: Passeriformes
- Family: Thamnophilidae
- Genus: Phlegopsis
- Species: P. nigromaculata

Binomial name
- Phlegopsis nigromaculata (d'Orbigny & Lafresnaye, 1837)

Synonyms
- Phlegopsis paraensis

= Black-spotted bare-eye =

Species of passerine bird

The black-spotted bare-eye (Phlegopsis nigromaculata) is a species of insectivore passerine bird in subfamily Thamnophilinae of family Thamnophilidae, the "typical antbirds". It is found in Bolivia, Brazil, Colombia, Ecuador, and Peru.

== Taxonomy and systematics ==
The black-spotted bare-eye was described by the French naturalists Alcide d'Orbigny and Frédéric de Lafresnaye in 1837 and given the binomial name Myothera nigro-maculata. The specific epithet combines the Latin words niger for "black" and maculatus for "spotted".

The black-spotted bare-eye has these four subspecies:

- P. n. nigromaculata (d'Orbigny & Lafresnaye, 1837)
- P. n. bowmani Ridgway, 1888
- P. n. confinis Zimmer, JT, 1932
- P. n. paraensis Hellmayr, 1904

== Description ==
The black-spotted bare-eye is 16.5 to 18.5 cm (6.5 to 7.3 in) long and weighs 42 to 51 g (1.5 to 1.8 oz). The sexes are alike. Both have a large ring of bare red skin around the eye. Adults of the nominate subspecies P. n. nigromaculata have a black head, neck, throat, and upper belly. Their upperparts are light olive with lengthwise oval black spots that have pale yellowish olive-brown edges. Their flight feathers are cinnamon-rufous and their tail rufous-chestnut. Their underparts below the black breast are olive-brown that becomes cinnamon-rufous towards the tail.

Subspecies P. n. confinis is smaller than the nominate, has a larger ring of bare facial skin, and is more heavily spotted. P. n. bowmani has brighter and more yellowish upperparts than the nominate and its spots are wider than they are long. P. n. paraensis has a larger facial ring than the nominate; it has light rufous-brown upperparts and its spots are smaller and rounder than the nominate's and edged with cinnamon.

== Distribution and habitat ==
The subspecies of the black-spotted bare-eye are found thus:

- P. n. nigromaculata: from south-central Colombia's Meta Department south through northeastern Ecuador, eastern Peru, and southwestern Amazonian Brazil into northeastern Bolivia
- P. n. bowmani: south-central Amazonian Brazil and into northeastern Bolivia's Santa Cruz Department
- P. n. confinis: east-central Amazonian Brazil from the Rio Xingu east to the rios Tocantins and Araguaia
- P. n. paraensis: northeastern Brazil in southern Amapá state and south of the Amazon east from the Tocantins to western Maranhão state

The black-spotted bare-eye inhabits humid evergreen forest in lowlands and foothills. In the western part of its range it mostly occurs in várzea and less frequently in terra firme and the transition zone between the two forest types. Further east it occurs in these three forest types and also igapó . In elevation it occurs as high as 800 m (2,600 ft) in Peru but only reaches 500 m (1,600 ft) in Colombia and 400 m (1,300 ft) in Ecuador; in most of Brazil it occurs below 600 m (2,000 ft).

== Behavior ==
=== Movement ===
The black-spotted bare-eye is believed to be a year-round resident throughout its range.

=== Feeding ===
The black-spotted bare-eye is an obligate ant follower that feeds on a variety of arthropods that flee foraging army ant swarms. It typically forages individually, in pairs, and in family groups, perching within about 1 m (3 ft) of the ground and sallying or pouncing to the ground after prey. It occasionally makes short aerial sallies and also flips leaves on the ground to find prey. Several pairs family groups may attend an ant swarm; up to 22 individuals have been noted at one. It is dominant over most other ant followers but is subordinate to some other members of its genus.

=== Breeding ===
The black-spotted bare-eye's breeding season varies across its range. It breeds between August and March in Brazil and October and February in Peru. It appears to breed between October and June in Ecuador and its season in Colombia includes July. Its known nests vary; a flattish lining in a cavity, an open cup, and a flatter bowl have all been described. They are made of various plant materials including bamboo leaves, palm fronds, and thin vines often lined with thin plant fibers. The typical clutch size is two eggs. The female incubates at night and both parents during the day. Fledging occurs at least 13 days after hatch; the incubation period and other details of parental care are not known.

=== Vocalization ===
The black-spotted bare-eye's song is "a short series of moderately long, flat, rich whistles, each slightly lower in pitch and becoming harsher in quality"; the number of notes varies. It has been written as "zhweé, zhwu, zhwu" and "HEEEW heer heer". Its calls include an "abrupt 'chip', a long...'chirr' falling in pitch and intensity, and a short series...of lengthening notes that drop in pitch".

== Status ==
The IUCN has assessed the black-spotted bare-eye as being of Least Concern. It has a very large range; its population size is not known and is believed to be decreasing. No immediate threats have been identified. It is considered uncommon to fairly common in most of its range. It occurs in several large protected areas, both governmental and private, and its "range encompasses extensive areas of intact habitat which, although not formally protected, seem to be at little risk of development in near future".
