= Ant follower =

Type of bird

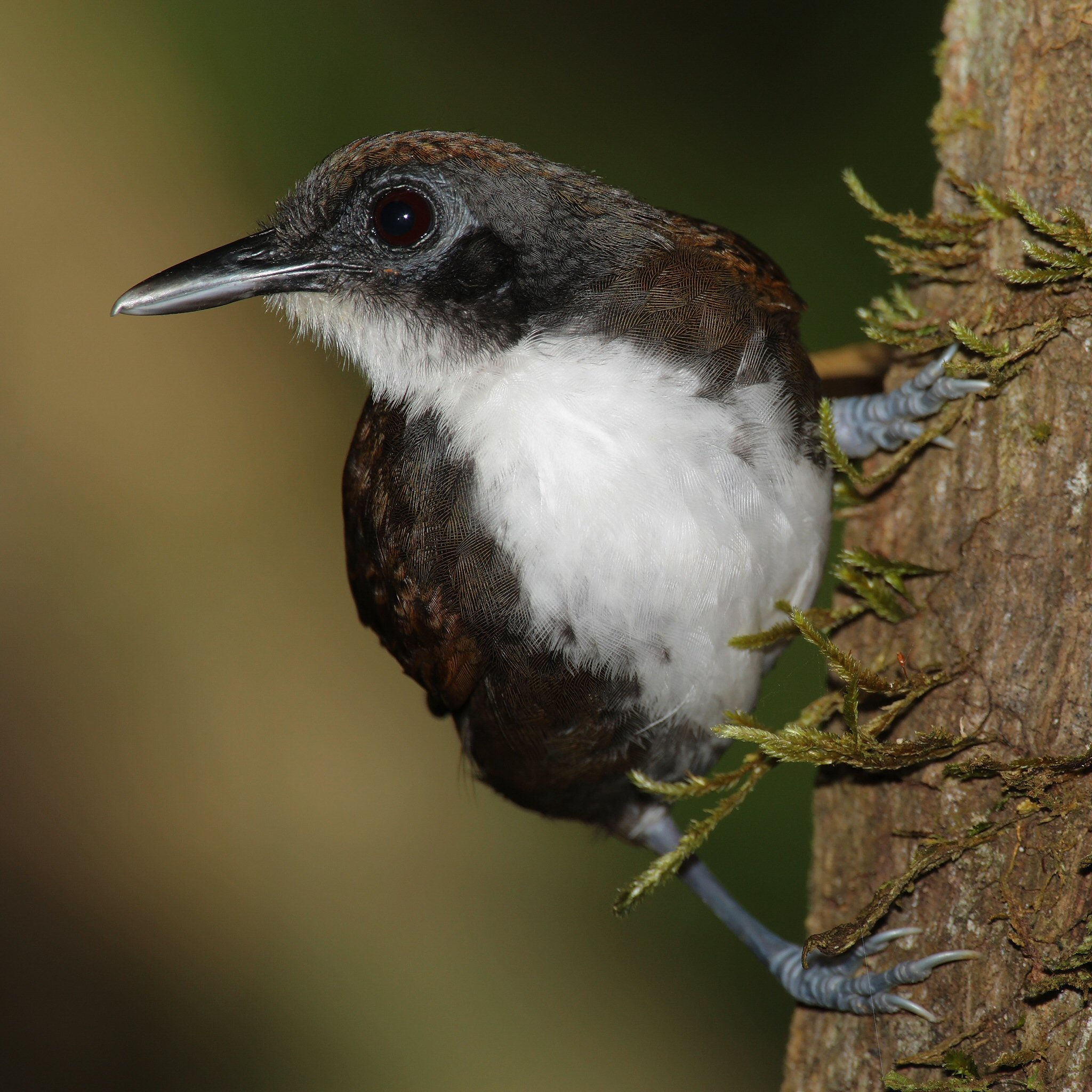
The bicoloured antbird is an obligate ant-follower.

Ant followers are birds that feed by following swarms of army ants and take prey flushed by those ants. The best-known ant-followers are 18 species of antbirds in the family Thamnophilidae, but other families of birds may follow ants, including thrushes, chats, ant-tanagers, cuckoos, motmots, and woodcreepers.

Ant followers may be obligate, meaning that they derive most of their diet by following ant swarms, or non-obligate, meaning they derive only some of their diet from this behaviour. Some species may feed extensively at ant swarms yet may not be obligate ant followers, regularly feeding away from the swarms as well.

Many species of tropical ants form large raiding swarms, but the swarms are often nocturnal or raid underground. While birds visit these swarms when they occur, the species most commonly attended by birds is the Neotropical species Eciton burchellii, which is both diurnal and surface-raiding.

It was once thought that attending birds were actually eating the ants, but numerous studies in various parts of E. burchellii's range has shown that the ants act as beaters, flushing insects, other arthropods and small vertebrates into the waiting flocks of ant followers. Because E. burchellii is the only regular diurnal army ant, specialised and regular ant-followers mostly occur in its Neotropical range, but Afrotropical birds do follow driver ants in the genus Dorylus.

In 1978, Willis and Oniki suggested that the relationship between the ant followers and the army ants, particularly Eciton burchellii, was mutualistic, with the ants benefiting by having the birds chase prey back down towards them. However, experiments where ant followers were excluded have shown that the foraging success of the army ants was 30% lower when the birds were present, suggesting that the birds' relationship was in fact parasitic. This has resulted in a number of behaviours by the ants in order to reduce kleptoparasitism, including hiding secured prey in leaf litter and caching food on trails. It has been suggested that the depressive effect of this parasitism slows the development of E. burchellii swarms and in turn benefits other ant species which are preyed upon by army ants.

Despite the easier availability of prey, ant followers face an element of risk, as these small birds can be killed by as few as four stings from fire ants.
